= Frank Henry Kerrigan =

American judge (1868-1935)

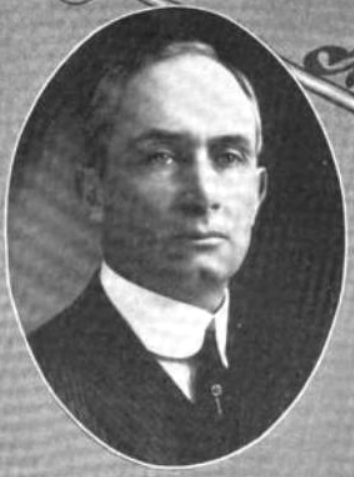

Judge of the United States District Court for the Northern District of California
- In office January 28, 1924 – February 9, 1935
- Appointed by: Calvin Coolidge
- Preceded by: William Cary Van Fleet
- Succeeded by: Michael Joseph Roche

Associate Justice of the California Supreme Court
- In office January 8, 1923 – February 11, 1924
- Preceded by: William A. Sloane
- Succeeded by: John E. Richards

Associate Justice of the California Court of Appeal, First District
- In office January 9, 1907 – January 7, 1923
- Preceded by: Ralph C. Harrison

Personal details
- Born: September 17, 1868 Contra Costa County, California
- Died: February 9, 1935 (aged 66) San Francisco, California
- Party: Republican
- Education: University of California, Hastings; College of the Law read law

Frank Henry Kerrigan (September 17, 1868 – February 9, 1935) was a United States district judge of the United States District Court for the Northern District of California. He also served for nearly 30 years as a California state court judge, and was an associate justice of the California Supreme Court from January 8, 1923, to February 11, 1924.

== Education and career ==
Kerrigan was born in Contra Costa County, California, to Henry Kerrigan and Elizabeth Donlin, and attended the local schools. Kerrigan then studied at University of California, Hastings College of the Law and read law to enter the bar in 1889. From 1890 to 1900, Kerrigan was in private practice in San Francisco, California. During this time, from 1894 to 1900, he was also a justice of the peace in San Francisco, and in January 1896 was made presiding justice of the court. When he resigned from the city court, Governor Henry Gage named Percy V. Long as a replacement.

== State judicial service ==
Kerrigan was elected a judge of the San Francisco County Superior Court from 1900 to 1906. In November 1900, he won election to a four-year unexpired term, at the same time future Supreme Court judges William P. Lawlor and M. C. Sloss won full terms on the Superior Court. In 1904, Kerrigan was re-elected to a new term on the trial bench. Following the 1906 San Francisco earthquake and fire, a test case was brought before Judge Kerrigan to establish land title since so many legal records were destroyed. Governor George Pardee appointed John A. Hosmer to Kerrigan's Superior Court seat when he went to the state appellate court.

In November 1906, Kerrigan was nominated on the Republican Party ticket and elected as an associate justice of the newly created California District Court of Appeals, First District. He held this seat from January 8, 1907 to January 7, 1923. The three judges elected in 1906 drew straws to determine length of term, and Kerrigan drew an eight-year term. In May 1907, Kerrigan was nearly run over by an automobile at the corner of Sutter and Gough Streets. In 1914, he ran successfully for re-election. In April 1920, he temporarily sat on the Supreme Court to fill the vacancy of Justice Lucien Shaw. At that time, Kerrigan sought the appointment to the open seat of Justice Henry A. Melvin, who died during his term. But Governor William Stephens named William A. Sloane to the position instead. Again, in November 1921, Kerrigan was a strong contender for appointment to the high court when Frank M. Angellotti retired, but he was not picked.

In November 1922, Kerrigan won election as an associate justice of the Supreme Court of California, serving from January 8, 1923, to February 11, 1924. In the election, he and Emmett Seawell replaced incumbent justices William Sloane and Charles A. Shurtleff.

== Federal judicial service ==
Kerrigan was nominated by President Calvin Coolidge on January 21, 1924, to a seat on the United States District Court for the Northern District of California vacated by Judge William Cary Van Fleet. He was confirmed by the United States Senate on January 28, 1924, and received his commission the same day. In February 1932, he was the trial judge for the case seeking to block construction of the Golden Gate Bridge, in which he upheld the legality of the special purpose district. In September 1932, during Prohibition, he ruled bottles and bottle caps had potentially legal uses and were not in violation of the national dry laws. Kerrigan died in office on February 9, 1935, in San Francisco. In August 1935, President Franklin D. Roosevelt announced that Superior Court Judge Michael Joseph Roche would succeed Kerrigan, instead of Congressman Clarence F. Lea, who had sought the post.

== Clubs ==
Kerrigan was an early bicycle aficionado, and was president of both the Associated Cycling Clubs in 1897, and the next year of the Bay City Wheelmen. In 1900, he was grandmaster of the 20-mile road race for the Baker & Hamilton Trophy. In 1904, he awarded the winner of the mile bicycle race the Frank Kerrigan cup. In December 1909, Kerrigan and his friends in the Olympic Club ran a four mile course capped by a mid-winter swim in the Pacific Ocean. He also belonged to the California Club, where he competed in tournament tennis. Kerrigan was a member of the Native Sons of the Golden West, and the Order of Eastern Star.

== Personal life ==
On November 29, 1905, Kerrigan married Jessie McNab. The couple reconciled after a separation from 1915 to 1918, and in 1920 they divorced. They had two children, Stewart and Jane.

== See also ==
- List of justices of the Supreme Court of California

== Sources ==
Legal offices
Preceded by William Cary Van Fleet	Judge of the United States District Court for the Northern District of California; 1924–1935	Succeeded by Michael Joseph Roche
Preceded by William A. Sloane	Associate Justice of the California Supreme Court; 1923–1924	Succeeded by John E. Richards
Preceded by Ralph C. Harrison	Associate Justice of the California District Court of Appeals, First District; 1907–1923	Succeeded by
