= William Langdon =

American judge (1873-1939)

William Henry Langdon
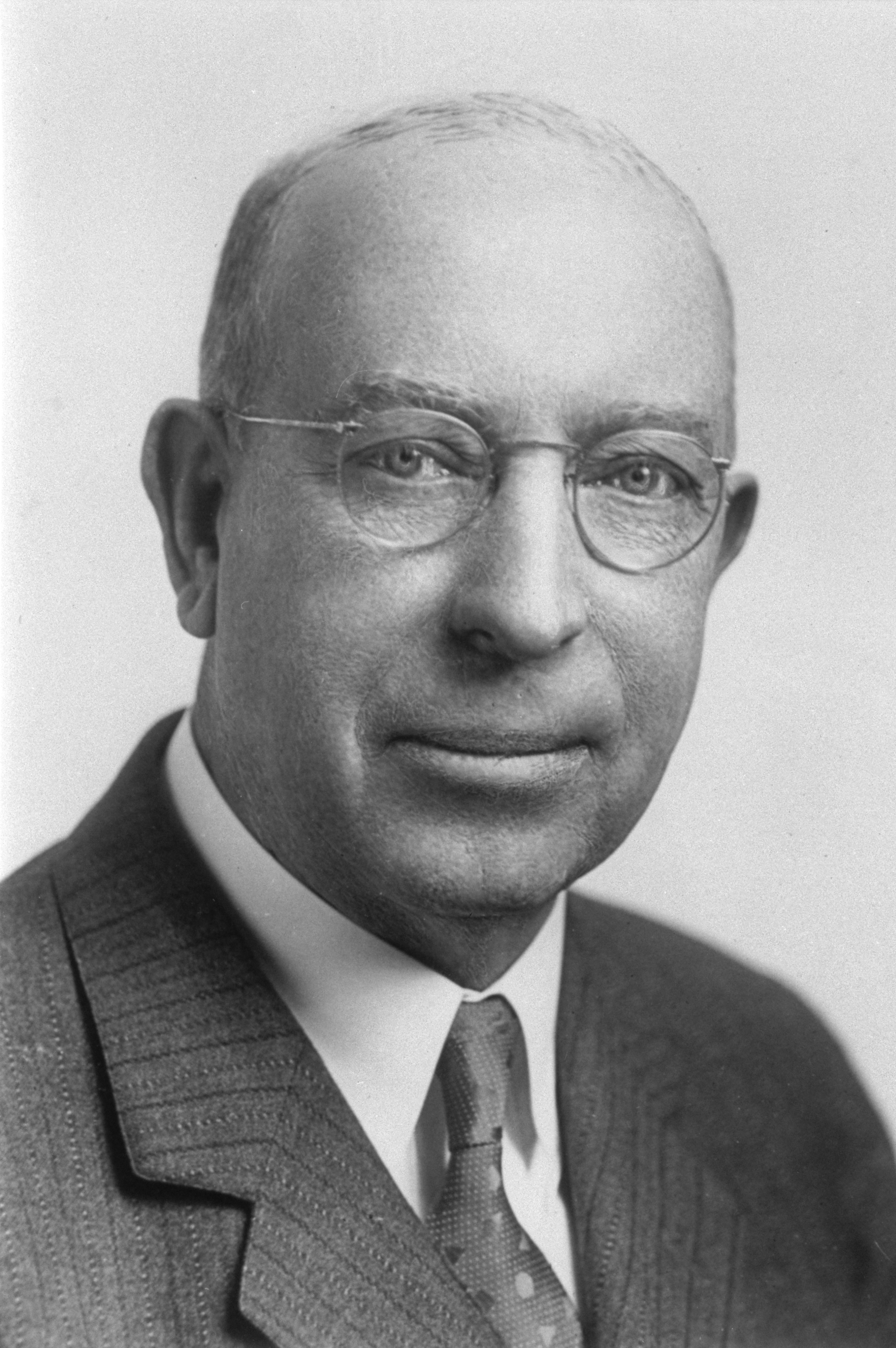
- Langdon c. 1937

Associate Justice of the California Supreme Court
- In office January 4, 1927 – August 10, 1939
- Preceded by: Jeremiah F. Sullivan
- Succeeded by: Phil S. Gibson

Presiding Justice of the California Court of Appeal, First District, Division Two
- In office January 1, 1919 – January 3, 1927
- Appointed by: William Stephens
- Preceded by: New seat
- Succeeded by: Joseph Koford

Judge of the Stanislaus County Superior Court
- In office August 9, 1915 – December 31, 1918
- Appointed by: Hiram Johnson
- Preceded by: New seat
- Succeeded by: James C. Needham

President of the California State Board of Education
- In office September 10, 1913 – August 8, 1915
- Preceded by: Office established
- Succeeded by: E. P. Clarke

Member of the California State Board of Education
- In office August 29, 1913 – August 8, 1915
- Appointed by: Hiram Johnson
- Preceded by: Office established
- Succeeded by: M. B. Harris

18th District Attorney of San Francisco
- In office January 8, 1906 – January 8, 1910
- Preceded by: Lewis Francis Byington
- Succeeded by: Charles Fickert

San Francisco Superintendent of Schools
- In office January 8, 1903 – January 8, 1906
- Preceded by: Reginald H. Webster
- Succeeded by: Alfred Roncovieri

Personal details
- Born: William Henry Langdon; September 25, 1873 Alameda County, California, U.S.
- Died: September 25, 1939 (aged 66) Hillsborough, California, U.S.
- Party: Democratic; Union Labor; Independence; Republican
- Spouse: Myrtie Conneau McHenry (m. 1908)
- Children: 3
- Education: California State Normal School (honorary B.A.)

William Henry Langdon (September 25, 1873 – August 10, 1939) was an American banker, lawyer and politician who served as Associate Justice of the California Supreme Court from 1927 to 1939. He previously served as District Attorney of San Francisco during the San Francisco graft trials.

== Education and early career ==
Langdon was born near Dublin, Alameda County, California, to Irish immigrants William and Annie Langdon. Following the death of Langdon's father in 1875, his mother ran a cattle and wheat ranch. Langdon was educated in the public schools and Hayward High School. He graduated from the California State Normal School to become a teacher, while also studying law in the offices of future Supreme Court Justice John E. Richards. In 1896, Langdon was admitted to the state Bar. Langdon served as vice principal and principal at schools in San Leandro, Fresno, and San Francisco, eventually being elected the latter city's school superintendent in 1902 on a Democratic-Union Labor ticket.

== Legal and judicial career ==
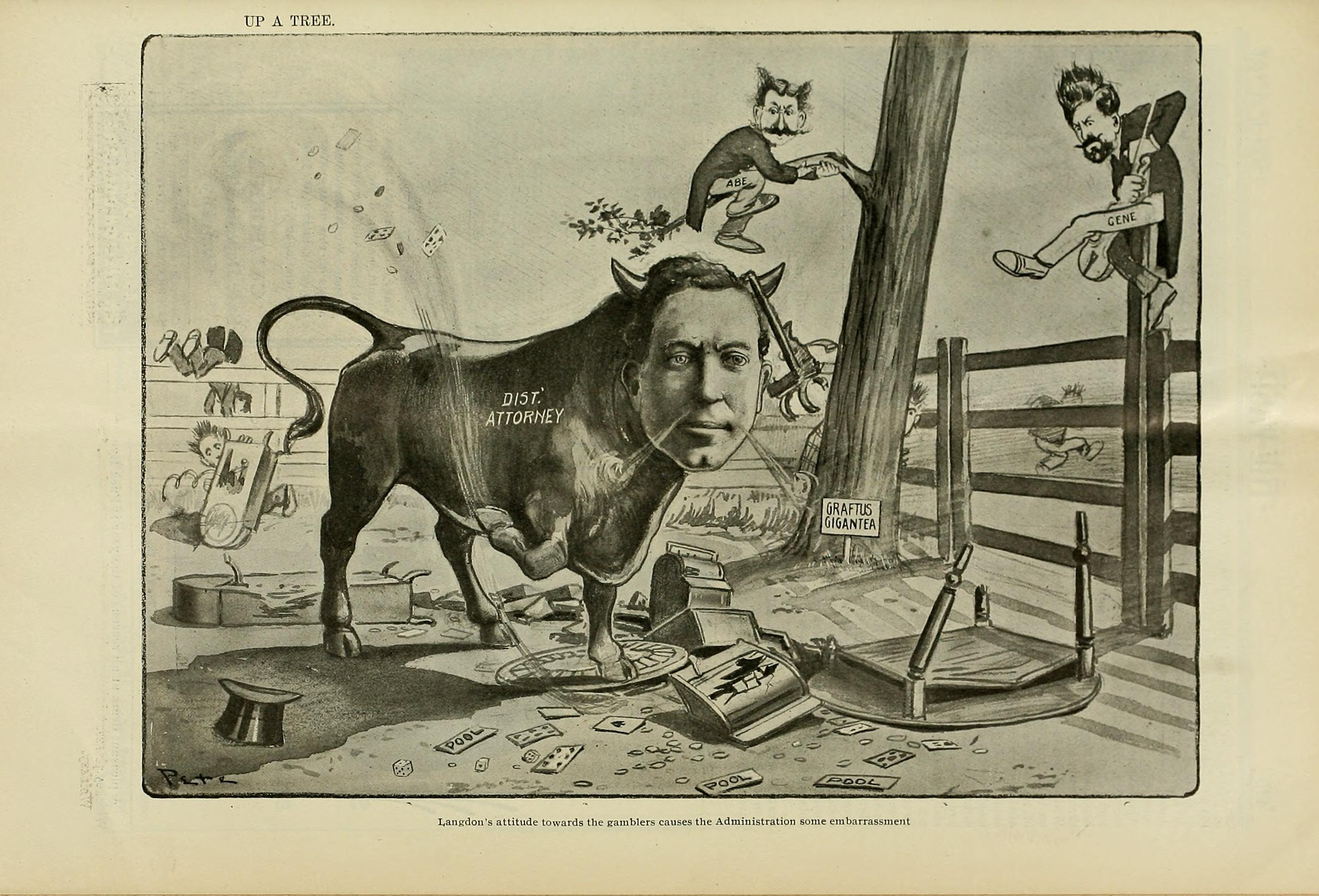
"Up A Tree," a political cartoon published in The Wasp depicting Langdon's raids on the city's gambling dens, March 24, 1906

In November 1905, city voters elected Langdon as district attorney of San Francisco on the Union Labor ticket, and in 1907 re-elected him to a second term. A popular district attorney, Langdon was nominated by the Independence League as its choice for governor in the 1906 elections. Langdon's presence as a strong third party candidacy won over 14 percent of the vote, proving to be a spoiler vote in a tight race between Democrat Theodore A. Bell and Republican James Gillett. In 1907, one year after the aftermath of the San Francisco earthquake, Langdon carried out the successful prosecutions both of Mayor Eugene Schmitz and political machine operator Abe Ruef for bribery and extortion, along with special assistants Francis J. Heney, Hiram Johnson and Matt Sullivan.

After his tenure as district attorney, Langdon entered banking, serving with several banks around Modesto and managing the property his wife had inherited from her first husband.

In 1913, Langdon was appointed to the reorganized State Board of Education by governor Hiram Johnson, his former colleague in the graft trials. He was elected president of the board, serving in both positions until 1915.

In 1915, he reentered law when Governor Hiram Johnson appointed Langdon a judge of the Superior Court of Stanislaus County. In December 1918, Governor William Stephens appointed Langdon presiding judge of the newly minted First District, Second Division, of the California Court of Appeal. In 1920, Langdon was elected to a full term.

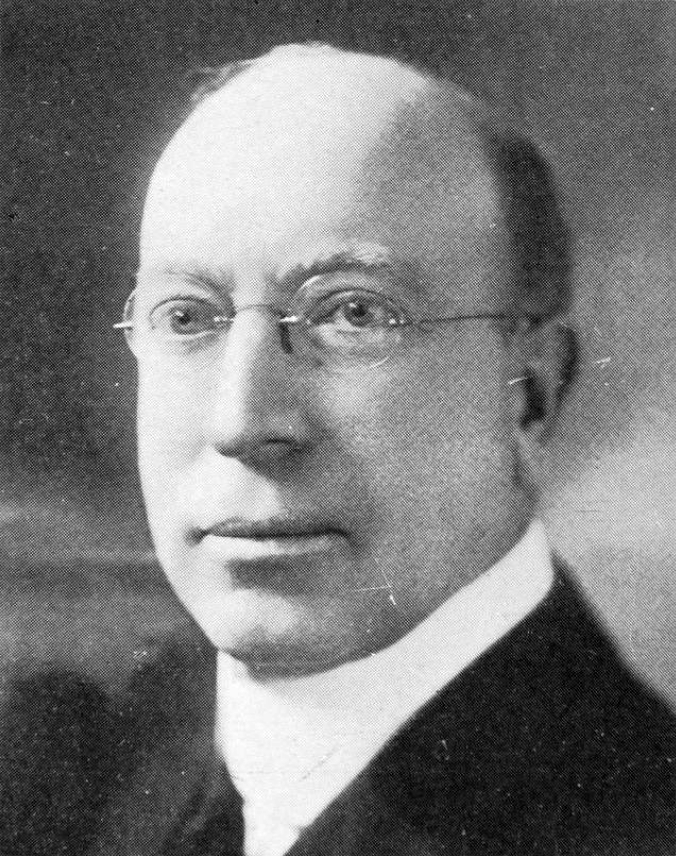
Langdon c. 1924

In November 1926, Langdon won election to a 12-year term as an associate justice of the Supreme Court of California, where he served the next nineteen years until his death in 1939. Langdon filled the unexpired term of William P. Lawlor, who died in office in July 1926, and whose seat was filled for three months by the appointment of Jeremiah F. Sullivan. From 1930 until 1939, treatise author Bernard E. Witkin served as Langdon's law clerk. In October 1939, the vacancy in Langdon's seat was filled by Governor Culbert Olson with the appointment of Phil S. Gibson.

Among Langdon's notable opinions is his 1930 dissent in the denial of a commuted sentence of convicted double murderer Ernest A. Dias. The majority of the court upheld the death penalty, but in dissent Langdon urged the governor to grant executive clemency on the basis of Dias' mental incompetence at the time of the killings. Another dissent that year came when Warren K Billings, convicted of perpetrating the 1916 San francisco Preparedness Day bombing alongside Tom Mooney, appealed to the court for a pardon. Although the majority of the court denied his request, Langdon dissented on the grounds that Billings had no obligation to prove his innocence, but rather that the prosecution had an obligation to prove his guilt.

== Personal life ==
On April 20, 1908, he married Stanford-trained school teacher Myrtie Conneau McHenry (December 2, 1878 – August 18, 1959), a wealthy widow from Modesto, California. They had one son: Lawton William Langdon (April 15, 1913 – September 23, 1960). His wife, Myrtie, also had two children from her first marriage: Lois Ann ("Annie") Langdon (Moran) (January 28, 1910 – May 11, 1973) and Merl McHenry (December 3, 1903 – January 3, 1994).

== See also ==
- List of justices of the Supreme Court of California

== Sources ==
- Leonard, John William (1911). Who's Who in Finance and Banking: A Biographical Dictionary of Contemporaries, 1920–1922. New York, NY: Joseph & Sefton. p. 402.

Legal offices
Preceded by Jeremiah F. Sullivan	Associate Justice of the California Supreme Court; 1927–1939	Succeeded by Phil S. Gibson
Preceded by New seat	Presiding Judge of the First District, Second Division of the California Court of Appeal; 1918–1927	Succeeded by Joseph Koford
