= Phil S. Gibson =

American judge (1888-1984)

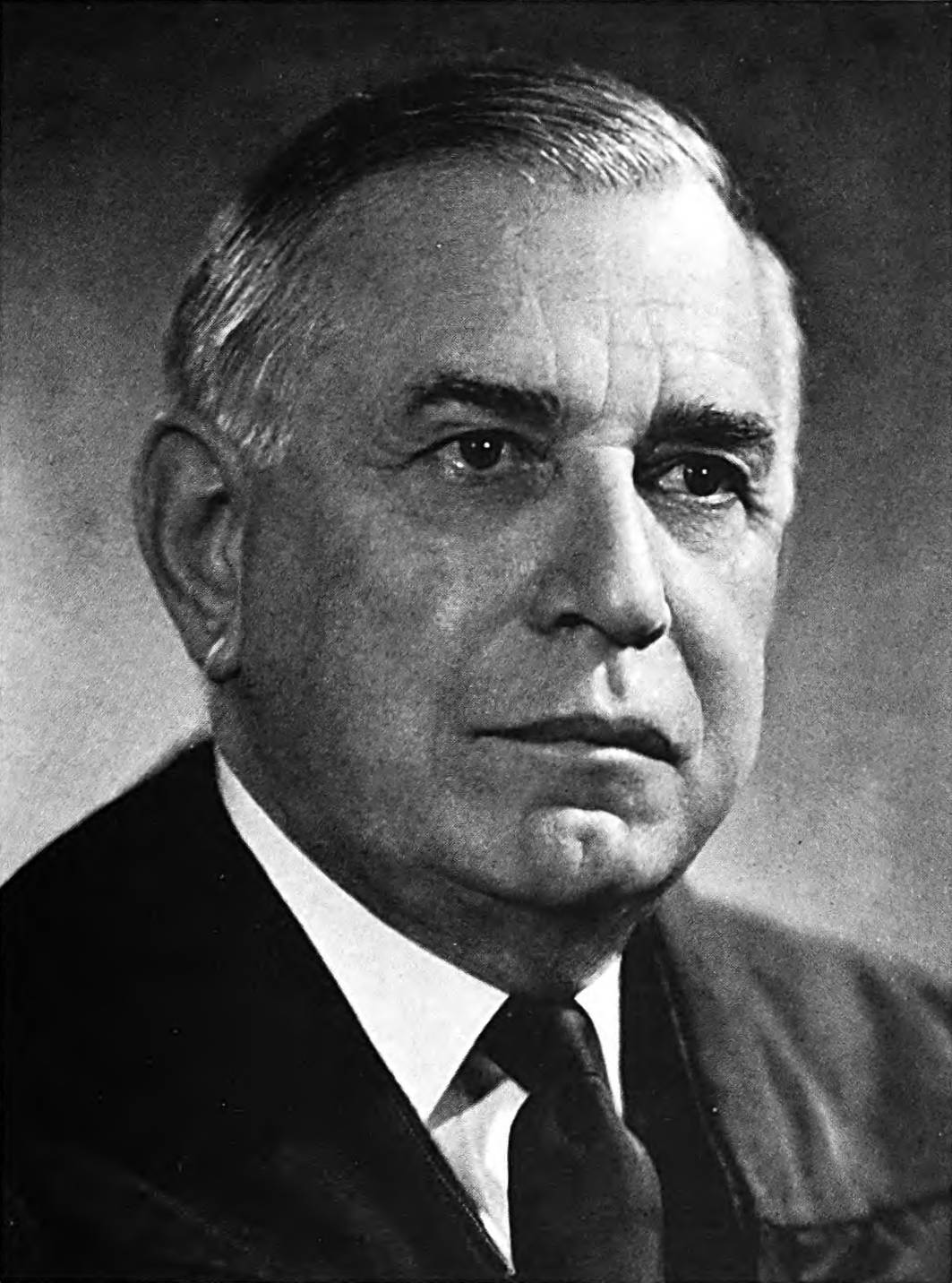
- Gibson c. 1963

22nd Chief Justice of California
- In office June 19, 1940 – August 30, 1964
- Appointed by: Governor Culbert Olson
- Preceded by: William H. Waste
- Succeeded by: Roger J. Traynor

Associate Justice of the Supreme Court of California
- In office October 2, 1939 – June 19, 1940
- Appointed by: Governor Culbert Olson
- Preceded by: William Langdon
- Succeeded by: Roger J. Traynor

Director of the California Department of Finance
- In office January 2, 1939 – October 1, 1939
- Appointed by: Governor Culbert Olson
- Preceded by: Arlin Stockburger
- Succeeded by: John R. Richards

Personal details
- Born: November 28, 1888 Grant City, Missouri, U.S.
- Died: April 28, 1984 (aged 95) Monterey County, California, U.S.
- Party: Democratic
- Spouse: Jessie Lee Parkhurst (m. 1922; died 1951) Victoria Gibson
- Children: Blaine Gibson
- Education: University of Missouri (A.B., LL.B.)

Phil Sheridan Gibson (November 28, 1888 – April 28, 1984) was the 22nd Chief Justice of California, serving for more than 24 years.

== Early life and education ==
Gibson was born in Grant City, Missouri, on November 28, 1888. He was the son of William Jesse and Mollie (Huntsman) Gibson. He attended the University of Missouri, graduating in 1912 with an A.B. and in 1914 with a LL.B. During college, he served as the secretary to the school's athletic director, Chester Brewer.

In June 1914, on his graduation from law school he formed a partnership with David H. Robertson in Mexico, Missouri, and in November 1914 he was elected the Prosecuting Attorney of Worth County, Missouri. In April 1918, during World War I, Gibson was commissioned a Lieutenant in the 137th Infantry of the American Expeditionary Force, and later that year was posted to the front. After the war, he studied at the Inns of Court in London. Discharged from the service in 1920, he joined his brother in Denver, Colorado, and practiced law for two years.

== Legal and judicial career ==
In 1922, Gibson moved to Los Angeles, establishing a practice, teaching at Southwestern Law School, and becoming active in Democratic politics. He served as a campaign advisor to Culbert Olson in 1938, and in December of that year the governor rewarded him with the position of Director of Finance. Then, in August 1939, Olson appointed Gibson as an associate justice to the Supreme Court of California to fill the vacant seat of William Langdon. Among Gibson's notable cases as an associate justice was his dissent from a contempt citation for commenting on judicial proceedings. On January 31, 1940, in a 5-2 decision by Jesse W. Curtis Sr., the court upheld the contempt ruling against the Los Angeles Times, rejecting the argument that it had a First Amendment right to criticize the court. Gibson dissented, joined by Douglas L. Edmonds. Upon appeal, in a 5-4 opinion by Justice Hugo Black, the U.S. Supreme Court reversed in Bridges v. California.

In June 1940, Chief Justice William H. Waste died in office, and Governor Olson appointed Gibson to the position. Gibson served as chief justice from June 19, 1940, to August 30, 1964, the second longest term in that office, behind only William H. Beatty who served 25 years. At the time of Gibson's appointment, he was the second youngest Chief Justice in the court's history. In November 1940, Gibson ran successfully for re-election to a full 12-year term. Again in November 1952, he was re-elected for another 12 years.

Gibson's notable cases as Chief Justice include his 1944 opinion in Ybarra v. Spangard concerning the negligence doctrine of Res ipsa loquitur in torts. In 1948, he voted with the 4-3 majority in Perez v. Sharp that the state's ban on interracial marriage violated the 14th Amendment of the United States Constitution. In April 1952, he wrote the decision in Sei Fujii v. California striking down the California Alien Land Law of 1913 as a violation of the 14th Amendment to the U.S. Constitution.

When Gibson retired on August 31, 1964, Governor Pat Brown elevated Roger J. Traynor from Associate Justice to the position of Chief Justice, and Stanley Mosk filled the empty seat as associate justice.

Gibson's lengthy tenure was notable for his efforts to modernize the administration of the courts, to set up a mechanism to remove unfit judges, and to supply the Supreme Court with a staff of research attorneys. Gibson's court was highly respected nationally, both for Gibson's opinions and for those of Traynor.

Gibson died in Monterey County, California, on April 28, 1984.

== Honors and legacy ==
In May 1946, he was on a short list of possible appointments by President Harry S Truman to become Chief Justice of the United States. In 1955, the University of Missouri conferred on Gibson an honorary doctor of law degree.

== Personal life ==
On June 3, 1922, Gibson married Jessie Lee Parkhurst in Chicago, Illinois. After her death on September 8, 1951, he remarried to Victoria Gibson. Phil Gibson's son, Blaine, shares his name with Gibson's younger brother, and is a self-professed adventurer and explorer who has discovered much of the debris from Malaysia Airlines Flight 370.

== See also ==
- List of justices of the Supreme Court of California

Legal offices
Preceded by William H. Waste	Chief Justice of California; 1940–1964	Succeeded by Roger J. Traynor
Preceded by William Langdon	Associate Justice of the California Supreme Court; 1939–1940	Succeeded by Roger J. Traynor
