= Angellotti =

Angellotti is an Italian surname. Notable people with the surname include:

- Frank M. Angellotti (1861–1932), American judge
- Marion Polk Angellotti (1887–1979), American writer
- Nicolás Angellotti (born 1990), Argentine professional footballer
