= Frederick W. Henshaw =

American judge (1858–1929)

- Henshaw in 1915

Associate Justice of the California Supreme Court
- In office December 29, 1894 – January 1, 1918
- Appointed by: Direct election
- Preceded by: John J. De Haven
- Succeeded by: Curtis D. Wilbur

Personal details
- Born: May 24, 1858 Ottawa, Illinois, U.S.
- Died: June 8, 1929 (aged 71) San Francisco, California, U.S.
- Spouse: Grace S. Tubbs (m. 1888) Helen (Walker) Tay (m. 1904)
- Education: University of California, Berkeley (BA)

Frederick William Henshaw (May 24, 1858 – June 8, 1929) was an American attorney and Associate Justice of the Supreme Court of California from December 29, 1894, to January 1, 1918, whose 23-year tenure is among the longest on the high court.

== Early life and education ==
Henshaw was born in Ottawa, Illinois, to Sarah Edward Tyler (September 18, 1822 – August 30, 1894) and Edward Carrington Henshaw (c. 1821 – September 14, 1872), who was captain of Henshaw's Battery Light Artillery, or Ottawa Light Artillery, in the American Civil War. Henshaw followed his brothers, Edward T. Henshaw and William G. Henshaw, to California and attended the University of California, Berkeley, graduating in 1879. He began reading law, joining the bar in 1880.

== Legal and judicial career ==
Henshaw c. 1904

In 1883, Henshaw won election as Justice of the Peace, or Police Court judge, in Oakland, California at the age of 25. In 1889, he was found in contempt of the Superior Court for not vacating the office of Police Judge to the next elected official, S. F. Daniels.

In 1889, Henshaw was elected judge of the Alameda County Superior Court, and on January 5, 1890, began his term. Having succeeded E. M. Gibson, Henshaw would serve four years on the superior court. When he left for the Supreme Court, Governor Henry Markham appointed A. L. Frick to the vacant superior court seat.

Henshaw (standing, far left) with other Justices of the Supreme Court of California c. 1897–1898

In December 1894, Henshaw successfully ran on the Republican ticket for election to the California Supreme Court for a 12-year term. At the same election, Jackson Temple also won a 12-year term, and the two jurists replaced departing justices John J. De Haven and William F. Fitzgerald. At the court, Chief Justice William H. Beatty assigned Henshaw to Department Two, along with Associate Justices William G. Lorigan and Henry A. Melvin. On November 6, 1906, Henshaw was re-elected to another 12-year term. With one year remaining of his second term, he announced his retirement from the high court.

Henshaw weathered controversy in his time on the court. On May 14, 1908, the San Francisco Call newspaper published a group photo at a political convention including Henshaw and notorious politician Abe Ruef, implying Henshaw's familiarity made him part of the corrupt machine. In 1911, California attorney William Denman proposed impeachment proceedings against Henshaw in relation to the procedures for signing an order of rehearing of the appeal of Abe Ruef. In November 1918, Henshaw denied charges that he had accepted a bribe while still a justice to influence his vote in the estates and trust case of Nevada Senator James G. Fair.

After stepping down from the bench, Henshaw pledged to work in Washington, D.C., as one of President Woodrow Wilson's business experts fixing government, or so-called "dollar-a-year" man, but there is no record he did so. Instead, he re-entered private practice with the firm of Henshaw, Black & Goldberg in Oakland.

== Personal life ==
On April 9, 1888, he married Grace Susan Tubbs in Oakland, California. They had four sons: Tyler Tubbs Henshaw, who became an attorney, Stanley Tubbs Henshaw, Fritz Tubbs Henshaw, who worked with his uncle William G. Henshaw at Union Savings Bank, and Stuart Tubbs Henshaw. On February 16, 1904, he remarried to Helen Walker Tay, who was previously married, in San Francisco, California. On June 8, 1929, Henshaw died in San Francisco.

== See also ==
- List of justices of the Supreme Court of California

Political offices
Preceded by John J. De Haven	Associate Justice of the California Supreme Court; 1894–1918	Succeeded by Curtis D. Wilbur
