= Jeremiah Sullivan (disambiguation) =

Jeremiah Sullivan (1794–1870) was a justice of the Indiana Supreme Court.

Jeremiah Sullivan may also refer to:

- Jeremiah C. Sullivan (1830–1890), Civil War Union general
- Jeremiah F. Sullivan (1851–1927), Associate Justice of the California Supreme Court
