= William H. Waste =

American judge (1868-1940)

William Harrison Waste
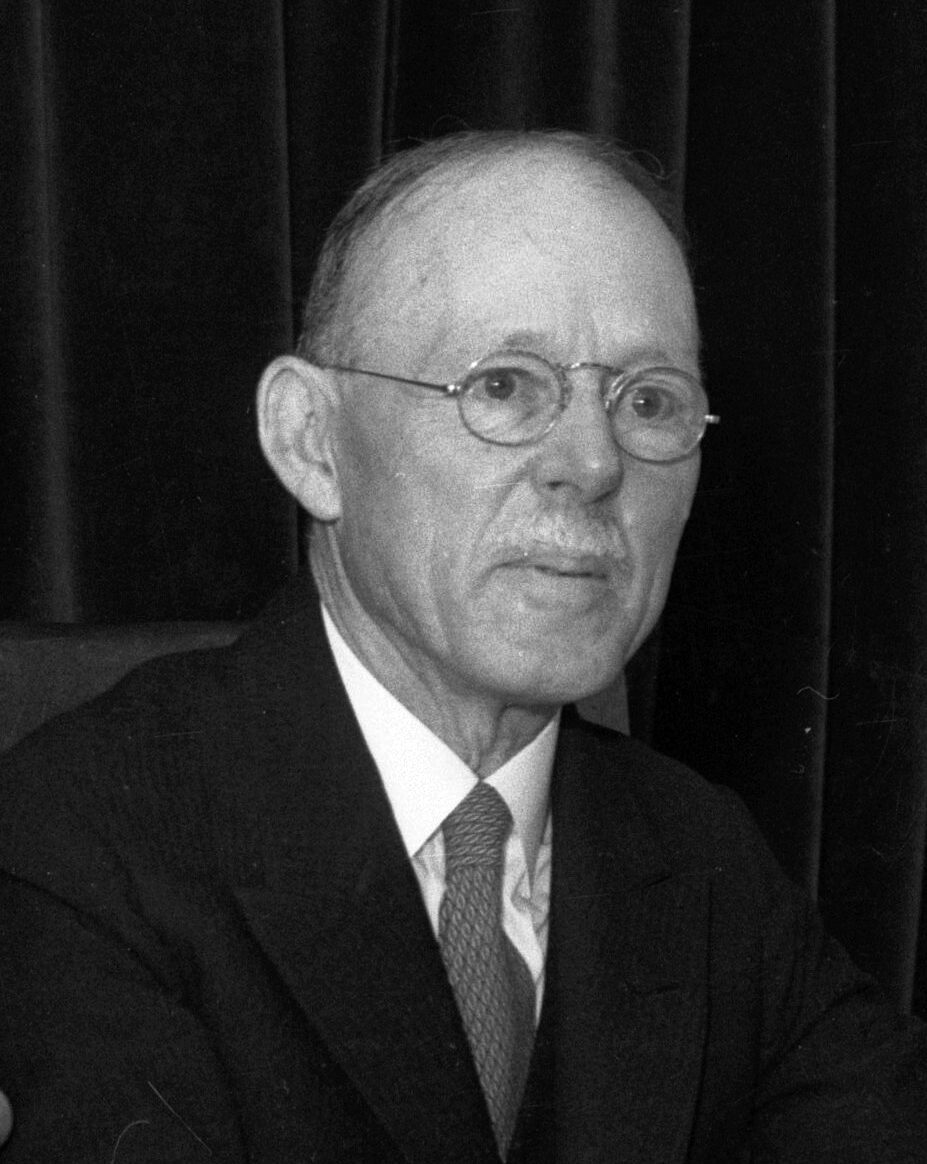
- Waste in 1934

21st Chief Justice of California
- In office January 1, 1926 – June 6, 1940
- Preceded by: Louis Wescott Myers
- Succeeded by: Phil S. Gibson

Associate Justice of the California Supreme Court
- In office November 25, 1921 – January 1, 1926
- Appointed by: Governor William Stephens
- Preceded by: Lucien Shaw
- Succeeded by: Jesse W. Curtis Sr.

Presiding Justice of the California Court of Appeals, First District
- In office January 1, 1919 – November 24, 1921
- Appointed by: Governor William Stephens
- Preceded by: Thomas J. Lennon
- Succeeded by: John F. Tyler

Member of the California State Assembly from the 52nd district
- In office January 5, 1903 - April 13, 1905
- Preceded by: Henry Ward Brown
- Succeeded by: John M. Eshleman

Personal details
- Born: October 31, 1868 Chico, California, U.S.
- Died: June 6, 1940 (aged 71) Berkeley, California, U.S.
- Spouse: Mary Jane Ewing (m. 1896)
- Education: University of California, Berkeley (B.Phil.); University of California, Hastings College of the Law (LL.B.)

William Harrison Waste (October 31, 1868 – June 6, 1940) was the 21st Chief Justice of California.

== Biography ==
Waste c. 1903

Born near Chico, California, Waste was educated at Los Angeles High School, graduating in 1887. He graduated from the University of California in 1891 and Hastings Law School in San Francisco in 1894. He practiced law in Oakland and later in Berkeley. In 1893, he co-founded the Holmes Library Association, which later became the Berkeley Public Library, and was its first president. From 1902 to 1905 he served in the California State Assembly as a Republican from the 52nd district.

In April 1905, Governor George Pardee appointed Waste as judge of the Alameda County Superior Court, where he remained until December 1918. On December 19, 1918, Governor William Stephens appointed Waste the presiding justice of the First District Court of Appeal, Division One. Waste replaced Thomas J. Lennon, who was named to the Supreme Court on December 20, 1918.

When Frank M. Angellotti resigned as Chief Justice, Governor Stephens elevated Lucien Shaw to Chief Justice, and then named Waste to take Shaw's place as an associate justice effective November 25, 1921. In December 1925, Chief Justice Louis Wescott Myers resigned and Governor Friend W. Richardson named Waste the Chief Justice as of January 1926. In November 1926, Waste was retained in the election. When Waste was elevated to Chief Justice, Jesse W. Curtis Sr. was named from the Second District Court of Appeal, Division One, to fill the vacancy as associate justice.

Among his notable cases is In re San Francisco Chronicle (1934), a contempt of court proceeding against a newspaper for publishing an article stating the court had ruled in a case that was still pending. The story concerned David Lamson, who was convicted, sentenced to the death penalty, and had filed an appeal. The newspaper ran a story that the court granted a new trial, based on anonymous sources. The newspaper asserted it had published in "good faith" but the court rejected the defense. In an opinion by Waste, the court found the Chronicle in contempt and fined the paper, editor and managing editor.

== State bar ==
Waste was the first lawyer registered with the State Bar of California. As Chief Justice, he was assigned State Bar Number 1 in 1927 when the State Bar was formed and began registering attorneys and judges.

== Personal life ==
On September 16, 1896, he married Mary Jane Ewing in Oakland, California, with whom he had two children.

== Death ==
Waste died in office on June 6, 1940, and Associate Justice Phil S. Gibson was named the next Chief Justice on June 20, 1940.

== Legacy ==
Waste was the first recipient of the Benjamin Ide Wheeler Medal in 1929.

== See also ==
- List of justices of the Supreme Court of California

Legal offices
Preceded by Louis Wescott Myers	Chief Justice of California; 1926–1940	Succeeded by Phil S. Gibson
Preceded by Lucien Shaw	Associate Justice of the California Supreme Court; 1921–1926	Succeeded by Jesse W. Curtis Sr.
Preceded by Thomas J. Lennon	Presiding Justice of the California Court of Appeals, First District; 1919–1921	Succeeded by John F. Tyler
