= John Wescott Myers =

John Wescott Myers (born Los Angeles, California, June 13, 1911 – died Beverly Hills, California, January 31, 2008) was a World War II test pilot who helped develop the P-61 fighter plane.

The son of Louis Wescott Myers, a prominent California judge and lawyer, Myers was educated at The Thacher School, Stanford University and Harvard Law School. He returned to California to practice law, but was an avid pilot. When the US entered World War II, Myers took a job in the legal department of Lockheed, hoping to get piloting work. He was soon ferrying aircraft for them as a sideline, and did some test-piloting on the YP-38. He joined Northrop Aircraft in 1941 as chief engineering test pilot, flying many of Northrop's experimental planes. He was heavily involved with the P-61 program; he test-piloted the plane, and then taught American pilots on the Pacific Front to fly it. He was called "Maestro" for his flying skills. While in New Guinea, Myers gave a ride to fellow trainer Charles Lindbergh; Lindbergh later wrote of how Myers avoided a potentially fatal accident by evading a plane that landed too closely behind their own plane.

After World War II, Myers successfully ran several aviation-related businesses.

Myers married Lucia Raymond in 1942; they had two children, Louis W. Myers II and Lucia Myers.

A small plant (Myers' Pincushion or Navarretia myersii) first identified on Myers' ranch was named in his honor due to his contributions to conservation.
