= List of justices of the Supreme Court of California =

Justices of the Supreme Court of California c. 1897–1898 Standing, left to right: Frederick W. Henshaw, Thomas Bard McFarland, William H. Beatty, Jackson Temple. Seated, left to right: William Cary Van Fleet, Charles H. Garoute, Ralph C. Harrison.

The Supreme Court of California is the highest judicial body in the state and sits at the apex of the judiciary of California. Its membership consists of the Chief Justice of California and six associate justices who are nominated by the Governor of California and appointed after confirmation by the California Commission on Judicial Appointments. The Commission consists of the Chief Justice, the Attorney General of California, and the state's senior presiding justice of the California Courts of Appeal; the senior Associate Justice fills the Chief Justice's spot on the commission when a new Chief Justice is nominated. Justices of the Supreme Court serve 12-year terms and receive a salary which is currently set at $250,075 per year for the Chief Justice and between $228,703 and $236,260 per year for each associate justice.

Under the 1849 Constitution of California, the Supreme Court had a chief justice and two associate justices, with six-year terms of office. An 1862 constitutional amendment expanded the Court to a Chief Justice and four associate justices, with 10-year terms. Since the adoption of the 1879 Constitution, the Court has had a chief justice and six associate justices, with 12-year terms.

The 1849 Constitution specified that the first Supreme Court justices would be appointed by the Legislature and that the justices would be subject to partisan direct elections from that point forward. The Governor could appoint justices in the event of a vacancy on the Court in between the elections. In 1910, elections for the Supreme Court became nonpartisan. In 1934, the state implemented the present system of gubernatorial appointment with retention elections, replacing the direct election of justices.

== List of justices ==
- Chief Justice Jackson Temple did not seek re-election in 1871, was elected as an associate justice in 1886 but resigned in 1889, and was again elected as an associate justice in 1895, serving until his death in 1902. Therefore, he is listed three times.
- * denotes justices who served as chief justice for at least part of their tenure on the court while denotes currently-serving justices.

Name	Assumed office	Vacated office	Appointed by
S. Clinton Hastings*	December 22, 1849	January 1, 1852	Legislature
Nathaniel Bennett	December 26, 1849	October 3, 1851	Legislature
Henry A. Lyons*	December 26, 1849	March 31, 1852	Legislature
Hugh Murray*	October 11, 1851	September 18, 1857	John McDougall
Solomon Heydenfeldt	January 20, 1852	January 6, 1857	Direct election
Alexander O. Anderson	April 6, 1852	November 2, 1852	John Bigler
Alexander Wells	January 3, 1853	October 31, 1854	Direct election
Charles Henry Bryan	November 24, 1854	November 15, 1855	John Bigler
David S. Terry*	November 15, 1855	September 12, 1859	Direct election
Peter Hardeman Burnett	January 13, 1857	October 12, 1857	J. N. Johnson
Stephen Johnson Field*	October 13, 1857	May 20, 1863	J. N. Johnson
Joseph G. Baldwin	October 2, 1858	January 2, 1862	Direct election
Warner Cope*	September 20, 1859	January 2, 1864	John B. Weller
Edward Norton	December 18, 1861	January 2, 1864	Direct election
Edwin B. Crocker	May 21, 1863	January 2, 1864	Leland Stanford
John Currey*	January 2, 1864	January 6, 1868	Direct election
Augustus Rhodes*	January 2, 1864	January 5, 1880	Direct election
Silas Sanderson*	January 2, 1864	January 4, 1870	Direct election
Lorenzo Sawyer*	January 2, 1864	January 10, 1870	Direct election
Oscar L. Shafter	January 2, 1864	December 11, 1867	Direct election
Joseph B. Crockett	December 1867	January 5, 1880	Henry Huntly Haight
Royal T. Sprague*	January 6, 1868	February 24, 1872	Direct election
William T. Wallace	January 10, 1870	January 5, 1880	Direct election
Jackson Temple	January 10, 1870	January 1, 1872	Henry Huntly Haight
Addison Niles	January 1, 1872	January 5, 1880	Direct election
Isaac S. Belcher	March 4, 1872	January 5, 1874	Newton Booth
Elisha W. McKinstry	January 5, 1874	October 1, 1888	Direct election
Robert F. Morrison*	January 5, 1880	March 2, 1887	Direct election
Samuel B. McKee	January 5, 1880	January 3, 1887	Direct election
Milton H. Myrick	January 5, 1880	January 3, 1887	Direct election
Erskine M. Ross	January 5, 1880	October 1, 1886	Direct election
John Sharpstein	January 5, 1880	December 28, 1892	Direct election
James D. Thornton	January 5, 1880	January 5, 1891	Direct election
Jackson Temple	December 13, 1886	June 25, 1889	Direct election
Van R. Paterson	December 22, 1886	May 3, 1894	Direct election
Thomas Bard McFarland	December 28, 1886	September 1908	Direct election
Niles Searls*	April 20, 1887	November 6, 1888	Washington Bartlett
John D. Works	October 2, 1888	January 5, 1891	Robert Waterman
William H. Beatty*	November 6, 1888	August 4, 1914	Direct election
Charles N. Fox	June 25, 1889	January 7, 1891	Robert Waterman
John J. De Haven	December 18, 1890	January 7, 1895	Direct election
Charles H. Garoute	December 19, 1890	January 5, 1903	Direct election
Ralph C. Harrison	December 20, 1890	January 5, 1903	Direct election
William F. Fitzgerald	February 2, 1893	January 7, 1895	Henry Markham
William C. Van Fleet	May 7, 1894	January 3, 1899	Henry Markham
Frederick W. Henshaw	December 29, 1894	January 1, 1918	Direct election
Jackson Temple	January 7, 1895	December 25, 1902	Direct election
Walter Van Dyke	December 22, 1898	December 25, 1905	Direct election
Frank M. Angellotti*	December 11, 1902	November 15, 1921	Direct election
Lucien Shaw*	December 11, 1902	January 1923	Direct election
William G. Lorigan	January 7, 1903	January 1919	Henry Gage
M. C. Sloss	December 19, 1906	March 1, 1919	George Pardee
Henry A. Melvin	September 28, 1908	December 1920	Direct election
Matt Sullivan*	August 22, 1914	January 4, 1915	Hiram Johnson
William P. Lawlor	January 3, 1915	July 25, 1926	Direct election
Curtis D. Wilbur*	January 1, 1918	March 19, 1924	William Stephens
Thomas J. Lennon	December 20, 1918	August 14, 1926	Direct election
Warren Olney Jr.	March 1, 1919	July 1921	William Stephens
William A. Sloane	May 15, 1920	January 7, 1923	William Stephens
Charles A. Shurtleff	July 2, 1921	December 1922	William Stephens
William H. Waste*	November 25, 1921	June 6, 1940	William Stephens
Terry W. Ward	December 19, 1922	January 8, 1923	Direct election
Frank H. Kerrigan	January 8, 1923	February 11, 1924	Direct election
Emmett Seawell	January 8, 1923	July 7, 1939	Direct election
Louis Wescott Myers*	January 15, 1923	January 1, 1926	Friend Richardson
John E. Richards	February 11, 1924	December 1932	Friend Richardson
John W. Shenk	April 14, 1924	August 3, 1959	Friend Richardson
Jesse W. Curtis Sr.	January 1, 1926	January 1, 1945	Friend Richardson
Frank G. Finlayson	October 4, 1926	December 11, 1926	Friend Richardson
Jeremiah F. Sullivan	November 22, 1926	December 1926	Friend Richardson
John W. Preston	December 27, 1926	October 6, 1935	Direct election
William Langdon	January 4, 1927	August 1939	Direct election
Ira F. Thompson	December 31, 1932	August 4, 1937	James Rolph Jr.
Nathaniel P. Conrey	October 6, 1935	November 2, 1936	Frank Merriam
Douglas L. Edmonds	November 23, 1936	December 31, 1955	Frank Merriam
Frederick W. Houser	October 1, 1937	October 12, 1942	Frank Merriam
Jesse W. Carter	September 12, 1939	March 15, 1959	Culbert Olson
Phil S. Gibson*	October 2, 1939	August 30, 1964	Culbert Olson
Roger J. Traynor*	August 13, 1940	January 31, 1970	Culbert Olson
B. Rey Schauer	December 18, 1942	September 15, 1964	Culbert Olson
Homer R. Spence	January 2, 1945	June 1, 1960	Earl Warren
Marshall F. McComb	January 3, 1956	May 3, 1977	Goodwin Knight
Raymond E. Peters	March 25, 1959	January 2, 1973	Pat Brown
Thomas P. White	August 25, 1959	October 31, 1962	Pat Brown
Maurice T. Dooling Jr.	June 30, 1960	June 30, 1962	Pat Brown
Mathew Tobriner	July 2, 1962	January 20, 1981	Pat Brown
Paul Peek	December 2, 1962	December 16, 1966	Pat Brown
Stanley Mosk	September 1, 1964	June 19, 2001	Pat Brown
Louis H. Burke	November 20, 1964	November 30, 1974	Pat Brown
Raymond L. Sullivan	December 20, 1966	January 19, 1977	Pat Brown
Donald Wright*	April 17, 1970	February 1, 1977	Ronald Reagan
William P. Clark Jr.	March 23, 1973	March 24, 1981	Ronald Reagan
Frank K. Richardson	December 2, 1974	December 2, 1983	Ronald Reagan
Wiley Manuel	March 24, 1977	January 5, 1981	Jerry Brown
Rose Bird*	March 26, 1977	January 5, 1987	Jerry Brown
Frank C. Newman	July 16, 1977	December 13, 1982	Jerry Brown
Otto Kaus	July 21, 1981	October 16, 1985	Jerry Brown
Allen Broussard	July 22, 1981	August 31, 1991	Jerry Brown
Cruz Reynoso	February 11, 1982	January 4, 1987	Jerry Brown
Joseph Grodin	December 27, 1982	January 5, 1987	Jerry Brown
Malcolm M. Lucas*	April 6, 1984	May 1, 1996	George Deukmejian
Edward A. Panelli	December 24, 1985	May 3, 1994	George Deukmejian
John Arguelles	March 18, 1987	March 1, 1989	George Deukmejian
David Eagleson	March 18, 1987	January 6, 1991	George Deukmejian
Marcus Kaufman	March 18, 1987	January 31, 1990	George Deukmejian
Joyce L. Kennard	April 5, 1989	April 5, 2014	George Deukmejian
Armand Arabian	March 1, 1990	March 1, 1996	George Deukmejian
Marvin R. Baxter	January 7, 1991	January 5, 2015	George Deukmejian
Ronald M. George*	September 3, 1991	January 3, 2011	Pete Wilson
Kathryn Werdegar	May 3, 1994	August 31, 2017	Pete Wilson
Janice Rogers Brown	May 2, 1996	June 30, 2005	Pete Wilson
Ming Chin	March 1, 1996	August 31, 2020	Pete Wilson
Carlos R. Moreno	October 18, 2001	February 28, 2011	Gray Davis
Carol Corrigan	January 4, 2006	Present	Arnold Schwarzenegger
Tani Cantil-Sakauye*	January 3, 2011	January 1, 2023	Arnold Schwarzenegger
Goodwin Liu	September 1, 2011	Present	Jerry Brown
Mariano-Florentino Cuéllar	January 5, 2015	October 31, 2021	Jerry Brown
Leondra R. Kruger	January 5, 2015	Present	Jerry Brown
Joshua P. Groban	January 3, 2019	Present	Jerry Brown
Martin Jenkins	December 4, 2020	October 31, 2025	Gavin Newsom
Patricia Guerrero*	March 29, 2022	Present	Gavin Newsom
Kelli Evans	January 2, 2023	Present	Gavin Newsom

== Sources ==
- Johnson, J. Edward (1963). History of the Supreme Court Justices of California, 1850-1900, Volume 1 (PDF). San Francisco, CA: Bender-Moss. Archived from the original (PDF) on December 27, 2016.
- Johnson, J. Edward (1966). History of Supreme Court Justices of California, 1900-1950, Volume 2 (PDF). San Francisco, CA: Bancroft-Whitney Co. Archived from the original (PDF) on January 25, 2017.
- Shuck, Oscar T. (1901). History of the bench and bar of California. Los Angeles: Commercial Printing House. pp. 349–354. ISBN 9781584777069.
- Rodman, Willoughby (1909). History of the bench and bar of southern California. Los Angeles: William J. Porter. p. 119.
- Wilson, E. Dotson; Brian S. Ebbert (2006). California's Legislature (PDF). Sacramento: California State Assembly. pp. 262–263.
