= Charles H. Garoute =

American judge (1854–1910)

Charles Henry Garoute
- Garoute c. 1897–1898

Associate Justice of the California Supreme Court
- In office January 5, 1891 – January 5, 1903
- Appointed by: Direct election
- Preceded by: James D. Thornton
- Succeeded by: Lucien Shaw

Personal details
- Born: October 15, 1854 Yolo, California, U.S.
- Died: July 17, 1910 (aged 55) Berkeley, California, U.S.
- Spouse: Clara Rebecca Hitchcock (m. 1878)

Charles Henry Garoute (October 15, 1854 – July 17, 1910) (also spelled Garoutte) was an American attorney and Associate Justice of the Supreme Court of California from January 5, 1891, to January 5, 1903.

== Biography ==
Garoute (seated, center) with other Justices of the Supreme Court of California c. 1897–1898

In 1854, Garoute was born on a ranch in Yolo County, California, to Jeremiah Monahan Garoutte (1825–1916) and Mary Jane Pedlar (1837–1913). He attended the public schools and began reading law. On January 11, 1876, at age 22, he was admitted to the California bar.

He entered into private practice in Yolo County, and held a series of public offices. From 1877 to 1879, he was district attorney of Yolo County. In January 1883, he was appointed a Notary Public for Yolo County. In 1884, he was elected a judge of Yolo County Superior Court, and served until 1891.

On November 5, 1890, Garoute won election to the California Supreme Court on the Republican ticket, and took his seat on January 5, 1891. In 1896, his health worsened, he was confined to bed for five weeks with a case of "nervous prostration", and in February 1897 he traveled to Honolulu, Hawaii, to rest and recover. In 1902, Garoute campaigned for the Republican Party nomination for Chief Justice against the incumbent, William H. Beatty. However, Beatty won the nomination and was re-elected. On January 5, 1903, Garoute stepped down from the bench.

After leaving the court, Garoute practiced law in San Francisco. In 1904, California Attorney General Ulysses S. Webb hired Garoute to pursue litigation concerning the state escheat fund. In 1908, he served as a member of the state Banking Commission.

Following the San Francisco earthquake and fire of 1906, he moved to Berkeley, California. He died at home in Berkeley on July 19, 1910.

== Civic activities ==
He was a founding member of the Native Sons of the Golden West, and was its president in 1887 to 1888.

== Personal life ==
In 1878, he married Clara Rebecca Hitchcock in Stockton, California, and they had two daughters: Grace G. Garoute (Hovey), and Amy I. Garoute (Haskell).

== See also ==
- List of justices of the Supreme Court of California

Legal offices
Preceded by James D. Thornton	Associate Justice of the California Supreme Court; 1891–1903	Succeeded by Lucien Shaw
