= Louis Wescott Myers =

American judge (1872-1960)

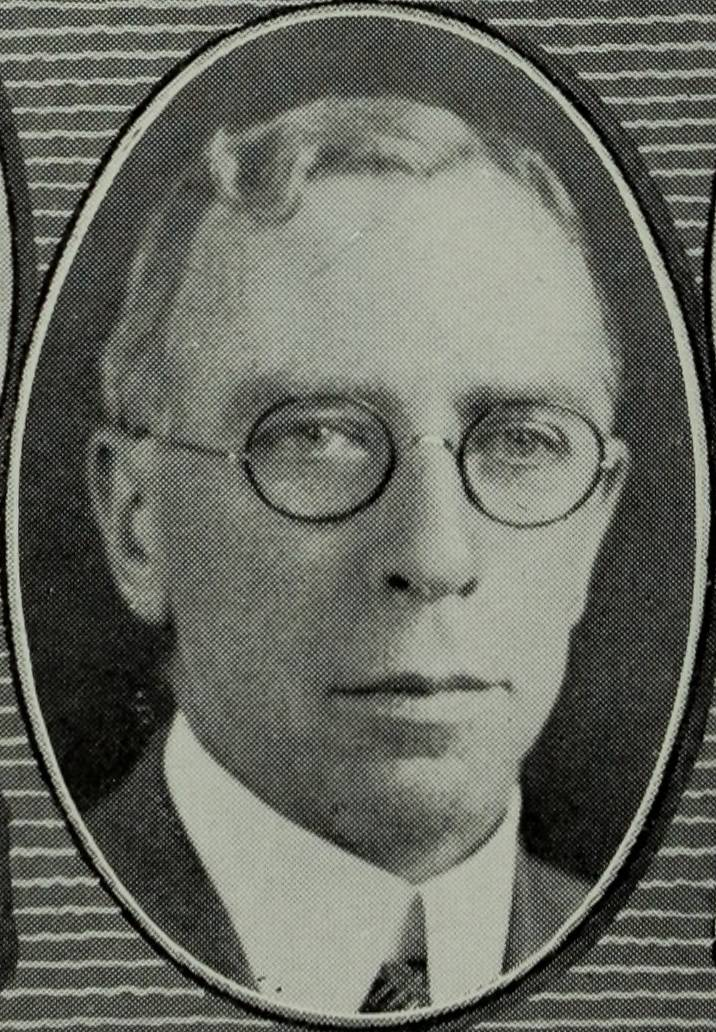
- Myers c. 1924

20th Chief Justice of California
- In office April 9, 1924 – January 1, 1926
- Appointed by: Governor Friend Richardson
- Preceded by: Curtis D. Wilbur
- Succeeded by: William H. Waste

Associate Justice of the California Supreme Court
- In office January 15, 1923 – April 8, 1924
- Appointed by: Governor William Stephens
- Preceded by: Curtis D. Wilbur
- Succeeded by: John W. Shenk

Personal details
- Born: September 6, 1872 Lake Mills, Wisconsin, U.S.
- Died: February 15, 1960 (aged 87) Beverly Hills, California, U.S.
- Spouse: Blanche Brown (m. 1901; died 1943)
- Children: Elizabeth Myers; John Wescott Myers
- Education: University of Wisconsin-Madison (B.L.); University of Wisconsin Law School (LL.B.)

Louis Wescott Myers (September 6, 1872 – February 15, 1960) was the 20th Chief Justice of California.

== Education and judicial career ==
Myers was born in Lake Mills, Wisconsin, to Jesse Hall Myers and Elizabeth Louise Wescott. Myers was educated in the public schools, and earned a bachelor's and a law degree at the University of Wisconsin-Madison, where he was Phi Beta Kappa. He practiced law first in Madison, Wisconsin, with the firm of Spooner, Sanborn & Kerr, and afterwards for several years in Chicago, Illinois with Jesse A. and Henry R. Baldwin. In 1898, he moved to Los Angeles, California and maintained a law firm. In 1913, he was appointed to a vacancy on the Los Angeles County Superior Court. He was elected in 1914 and re-elected in 1920.

On January 15, 1923, Governor William Stephens appointed Myers as Associate Justice of the Supreme Court of California to fill a vacancy when Curtis D. Wilbur was named chief justice. In April 1924, Governor Friend Richardson named Myers as Chief Justice to again replace Wilbur, who became the Secretary of the Navy. In October 1924, Myers ran unopposed and was elected for the remainder of Curtis' term, until January 1927. Myers served in that post until resigning as of January 1, 1926.

== O'Melveny & Myers ==
Following his tenure as Chief Justice, Myers joined a Los Angeles law firm run by Henry W. O'Melveny. Myers's name was added to the firm, which by 1939 became known as O'Melveny & Myers. He specialized in appellate practice. In 1938, Myers argued before the U.S. Supreme Court on behalf of Mackay Radio the case of NLRB v. Mackay Radio & Telegraph Co., 304 U.S. 333 (1938).

== Honors and awards ==
In 1925, Myers received an honorary degree of LL.D. from the University of Southern California. In 1926, he was awarded another honorary degree by the University of California.

== Personal life ==
On November 27, 1901, he married Blanche Brown (July 26, 1874 – May 1, 1943) of Michigan; they had at least two children: Elizabeth Myers and test pilot John Wescott Myers. Louis was an avid fisherman, and in 1951 published a short book, An Incompleat Angler.

== See also ==
- List of justices of the Supreme Court of California

Legal offices
Preceded by Curtis D. Wilbur	Chief Justice of California; 1924–1926	Succeeded by William H. Waste
Preceded by Curtis D. Wilbur	Associate Justice of the California Supreme Court; 1923–1924	Succeeded by John W. Shenk
