= William A. Sloane =

American judge (1854–1930)

William Arthur Sloane
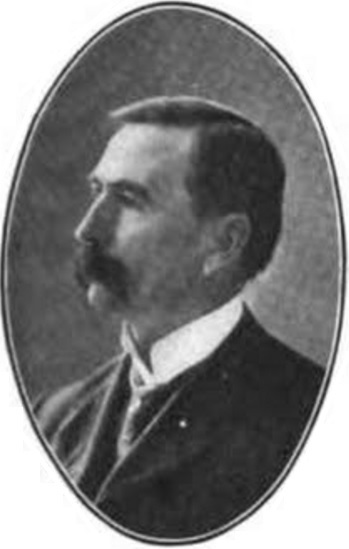
- Image of William A. Sloane, c. 1909.

Associate Justice of the California Supreme Court
- In office May 20, 1920 – January 7, 1923
- Appointed by: Governor William Stephens
- Preceded by: Henry A. Melvin
- Succeeded by: Frank H. Kerrigan

Associate Justice of the California Court of Appeal, Second District, Division Two
- In office January 1, 1919 – May 2, 1920
- Appointed by: Governor William Stephens
- Succeeded by: Dana R. Weller

Presiding Justice of the California Court of Appeal, Fourth District, Division One
- In office September 9, 1929 – April 21, 1930
- Appointed by: Governor C. C. Young
- Preceded by: New seat

Personal details
- Born: October 10, 1854 Rockford, Illinois, U.S.
- Died: April 21, 1930 (aged 75) San Diego, California, U.S.
- Spouse: Annie B. Kimball (m. 1882)
- Education: Grinnell College (B.A.)

William Arthur Sloane (October 10, 1854 – April 21, 1930) was an associate justice of the Supreme Court of California from May 15, 1920, to January 1923.

== Biography ==
Born in Rockford, Illinois, to Hampton P. and Adeline Sloane, his family moved to Missouri, where he attended the public schools, and then attended Grinnell College, receiving a B.A. in 1877. He was admitted to the Missouri Bar in 1878, practicing law in Sedalia, and working for two years as editor of the "Eagle Times". He then moved to Carthage, where he was managing editor of the "Daily Banner" for four years.

In 1886, Sloane moved to San Diego, California, where he engaged in the practice of the law until 1888, when he was elected as a justice of the Peace of San Diego Township. In 1912, Sloane was a Republican Party delegate to the national convention in Chicago, Illinois, pledged to support Theodore Roosevelt for President of the United States. Sloane held the trial court office for four years, thereafter returning to the practice of the law in association with A. A. Sweet and Lewis R. Kirby.

In 1898, Sloane formed a partnership with Judge Moses A. Luce, with whom he worked until 1911, when Governor Hiram Johnson appointed Sloane to the Superior Court of San Diego County. Sloane was re-elected to that office, which he held until January 1, 1919, when Governor William Stephens appointed him to the newly created Second Division of the California Court of Appeal, Second District.

In April 1920, Sloane resigned from the appellate court effective May 3, 1920, to accept an appointment to the California Supreme Court, filling a vacancy caused by the death of Associate Justice Henry A. Melvin. In September 1920, Sloane was elected over challenger John M. York to the two-year remainder of Melvin's term. In November 1922, Sloane ran unsuccessfully for re-election, campaigning on the point he was the sole candidate from Southern California. In the contest, incumbent justices Sloane and Charles A. Shurtleff were replaced by Frank H. Kerrigan and Emmett Seawell. Precinct returns show Sloane carried the Los Angeles vote, but lost the race in the San Francisco ballots.

After Sloane stepped down from the bench in January 1923, he again returned to private practice.

In 1930, when the Fourth Appellate District was created, Governor C. C. Young appointed Sloane to that court; however, Sloane soon became ill and died six months after taking office.

== Personal life ==
Sloane married Annie B. Kimball, of Vineland, New Jersey, on May 1, 1882, with whom he had three children: a daughter and two sons, Harrison G. Sloane and Paul E. Sloane, who both became attorneys.

== See also ==
- List of justices of the Supreme Court of California

Legal offices
Preceded by New seat	Presiding Justice, California Court of Appeal, Fourth District, Division One; 1929–1930	Succeeded by
Preceded by Henry A. Melvin	Associate Justice of the California Supreme Court; 1920–1923	Succeeded by Frank H. Kerrigan
Preceded by	Associate Justice of the California Court of Appeal, Second District, Division Two; 1919–1920	Succeeded by Dana R. Weller
