= James D. Thornton =

American judge in California (1823–1902)

James Dabney Thornton
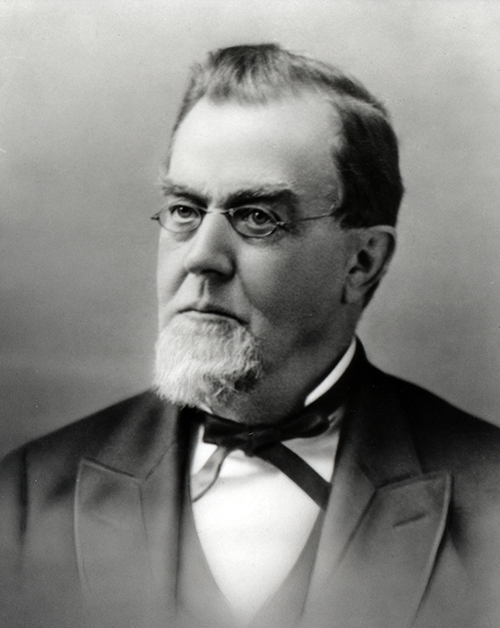

Associate Justice of the California Supreme Court
- In office January 5, 1880 – January 5, 1891
- Appointed by: Direct election
- Preceded by: New seat established by Constitution of California of 1879
- Succeeded by: Charles H. Garoute

Personal details
- Born: January 19, 1823 Oak Hill, Cumberland, Virginia, U.S.
- Died: September 27, 1902 (aged 79) San Francisco, California, U.S.
- Spouse: Sarah Frances Thornton (m. 1848)
- Education: University of Virginia (BA)

James Dabney Thornton (January 19, 1823 – September 27, 1902) was an American lawyer and judge who served as associate justice of the Supreme Court of California from 1880 to 1891.

== Early life and education ==
Thornton was born January 19, 1823, at Oak Hill in Cumberland, Virginia, to William Mynn Thornton and Elizabeth Anderson. He studied at the University of Virginia, graduating in 1841. After college, he read law for a year and then worked three years in a commercial house in Richmond, Virginia, while continuing his legal studies. In November 1848, he and his wife moved to Eutaw, Alabama, where his wife's father, Harry Innis Thornton Sr., was a judge and member of the Alabama Legislature. By 1851, Harry I. Thornton had moved to California and was appointed to the federal Public Land Commission to address property ownership in California. In 1854, James Thornton also determined to move to California, arriving in San Francisco in June 1854. There, he started a law firm with his father-in-law and John James Williams, whom he had befriended in Richmond, Virginia.

== Judicial career ==
In 1856, Thornton served as a district court commissioner for the Fourth district court in San Francisco. In August 1858, he was nominated by the Democratic Lecompton Party for judge of the Fourth district court.

In June 1861, he attended the state convention of the Breckenridge Democratic Party, with pro-Southern sympathies. During the Civil War, he refused to take the oath of allegiance to the United States, as did Solomon Heydenfeldt, who was born in Charleston, South Carolina. At that time, his wife's brother, the attorney Harry Innis Thornton Jr., gave a speech on the floor of the California State Senate defending the Southern states' rights to succeed, and afterwards left to fight for the Confederacy.

In 1878, James Thornton was appointed judge of the Twenty-third district court by Governor William Irwin.

In 1879, when adoption of a new constitution required elections for all seats on the Supreme Court, Thornton was nominated by both the Democratic and Workingmen's Parties and was elected. The newly elected judges drew lots to determine the length of term, and Thornton drew an 11-year term, the same length as Elisha W. McKinstry. In November 1890, just prior to the end of his term, he ran unsuccessfully as a Democrat for judge of San Francisco County Superior Court. Instead, after stepping down from the high court he returned to private practice.

He died September 27, 1902, in San Francisco.

== Personal life ==
On February 17, 1848, he married Sarah Frances Thornton in Eutaw, Alabama, and they had eleven children, including six who lived to adulthood: Crittenden Thornton, a lawyer in San Francisco; Harry I. Thornton, Jr., who graduated from Hastings College of the Law; Elizabeth Anderson 'Lizzy' Thornton (Mrs. John Crittenden Watson, an admiral); William M. Thornton, a banker in Montana and later businessman in Chicago; Margaret Thornton (Mrs. Abbott Kinney of Santa Monica); and John Thurston Thornton, also a lawyer in San Francisco. Two other daughters died before adulthood: Ann Mary Thornton (1851–1870) and Gertrude Thornton (1855–1877).

== See also ==
- List of justices of the Supreme Court of California

Legal offices
Preceded by New seat established by Constitution of California of 1879	Associate Justice of the California Supreme Court; 1880–1891	Succeeded by Charles H. Garoute
