= John E. Richards =

American judge

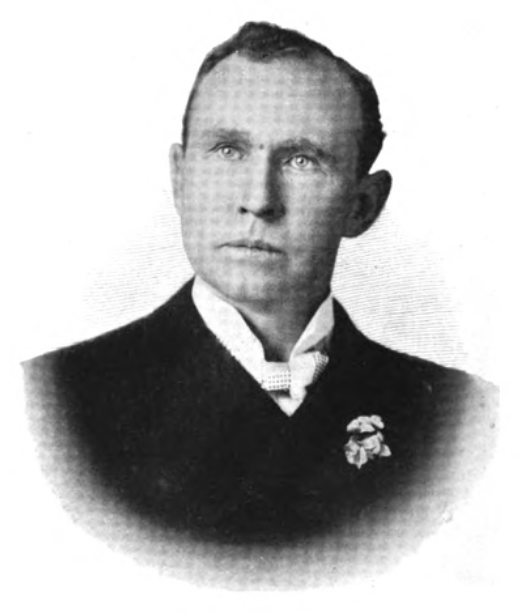

Associate Justice of the California Supreme Court
- In office February 11, 1924 – June 25, 1932
- Appointed by: Governor Friend Richardson
- Preceded by: Frank H. Kerrigan
- Succeeded by: Ira F. Thompson

Associate Justice of the California Court of Appeal, First District
- In office October 6, 1913 – January 3, 1927
- Appointed by: Governor Hiram Johnson
- Preceded by: Samuel P. Hall

Personal details
- Born: John Evan Richards; July 7, 1856 San Jose, California, U.S.
- Died: June 25, 1932 (aged 75) Santa Clara, California, U.S.
- Spouse: Mary Westphal (m. 1881)
- Education: University of the Pacific (BA); University of Michigan Law School (LLB)

John Evan Richards (July 7, 1856 – June 25, 1932) was an American attorney who served as an associate justice of the California Supreme Court from 1924 until 1932.

== Biography ==
Richards was born on July 7, 1856, to Richard Evan Richards and Mary Hamilton in San Jose, California, where he attended the public schools. He obtained his undergraduate degree from University of the Pacific in 1877 and his law degree from the University of Michigan Law School in 1879.

After graduation, Richards practiced law in San Francisco and San Jose with the firm of Moore, Lane & Leib, where future Justice William Langdon was later employed as a law clerk. In January 1904, Richards was elected a trustee of the newly formed Santa Clara Bar Association.

In September 1907, Governor James Gillett appointed Richards as judge of the Santa Clara Superior Court to fill the vacancy from the resignation due to age of Augustus Rhodes.

In October 1913, Governor Hiram Johnson elevated Richards to the First District Court of Appeal, replacing Samuel P. Hall who died in office. In October 1914, Richards won election to the remainder of Hall's unexpired term. From 1913 to 1916, he lectured at Santa Clara University School of Law.

On February 11, 1924, Governor Friend Richardson appointed Richards as an associate justice of the California Supreme Court to fill the vacant seat of Frank H. Kerrigan. In November 1924, Richards won election to the remainder of Kerrigan's unexpired term. His last opinion, Parra v. Traeger (1931) was filed on December 31, 1931. He died in office on June 25, 1932. Governor James Rolph appointed Ira F. Thompson to take the vacant seat.

== Honors and activities ==
Richards served as a trustee of the University of the Pacific, which in 1914 awarded him an honorary Master of Arts. In 1924, the University of Michigan conferred on him the honorary degree of Doctor of Laws. In his spare time, he wrote editorials, essays and poetry.

== Personal life ==
On November 3, 1881, Richards married Mary Westphal in San Jose, California. They had two sons: John P. Richards and Donald W. Richards.

== See also ==
- List of justices of the Supreme Court of California

Legal offices
Preceded by Frank H. Kerrigan	Associate Justice of the California Supreme Court; 1924 - 1932	Succeeded by Ira F. Thompson
Preceded by Samuel P. Hall	Associate Justice of the California Court of Appeal, First District; 1913 - 1924	Succeeded by
