= Jeremiah F. Sullivan =

American judge (1851–1928)

Jeremiah Francis Sullivan
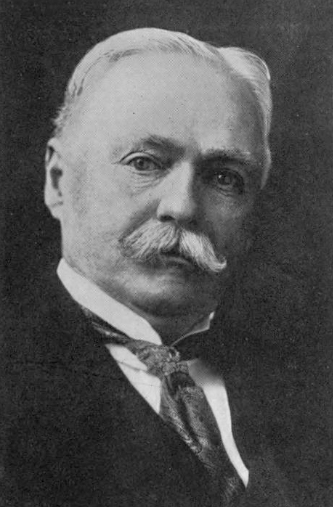

Associate Justice of the California Supreme Court
- In office November 22, 1926 – January 3, 1927
- Appointed by: Governor Friend Richardson
- Preceded by: William P. Lawlor
- Succeeded by: William Langdon

Judge of the San Francisco County Superior Court
- In office January 5, 1880 – August 1, 1889
- Preceded by: Office established
- Succeeded by: James McMillan Shafter

Personal details
- Born: August 19, 1851 New Canaan, Connecticut, U.S.
- Died: January 23, 1928 (aged 76) San Francisco, California, U.S.
- Spouse: Helen M. Bliss (m. 1876; died 1918)
- Education: St. Ignatius College Preparatory; St. Ignatius College (AB, MA)

Jeremiah Francis Sullivan (August 19, 1851 – January 23, 1928) was an associate justice of the Supreme Court of California from November 22, 1926, to January 3, 1927.

== Biography ==
Sullivan was born in New Canaan, Connecticut, one of eight children of Michael M. Sullivan and Margaret Bohane. In 1863, the family moved to the Mission District of San Francisco, California. Sullivan graduated from St. Ignatius College Preparatory, and in 1870, received both A.B. and M.A. degrees from St. Ignatius College. After graduation, he read law with the law office of Winans & Belknap to enter the bar on January 13, 1874. He then practiced in the firm of Meighan & Sullivan, and in 1877 sat on the San Francisco Board of Education.

Sullivan (bottom row, far left) with other judges of the Superior Court of San Francisco at the date of its organization, 1879

On September 2, 1879, Sullivan was elected as a judge of the San Francisco County Superior Court under the new constitution, and was re-elected in 1884. Among his notable cases is common law marriage and divorce case of Sarah Althea Hill against Senator William Sharon of Nevada. Sullivan ruled the marriage existed and ordered a property settlement. Former Chief Justice David S. Terry, who married Hill in 1886, then accused Sullivan in the press of taking a bribe to sway the case, which Sullivan disputed.

He served on the trial bench until August 1, 1889, and then re-entered private practice with this brother, Matt I. Sullivan. Sullivan's brother had previously served as Chief Justice of California, the only instance where siblings have served on that court. In 1883, he served as the presiding judge of the Superior Court.

In November 1886, Sullivan ran for the position of Associate Justice of the California Supreme Court under the Democratic Party, but lost to Van R. Paterson. On November 6, 1888, Sullivan ran again for the Supreme Court and narrowly lost the election to John D. Works. In December 1891, he was elected president of the Young Men's Democratic League.

In 1920 to 1921, Sullivan led the effort to reform the Police Courts in San Francisco and remove unfit judges.

On November 22, 1926, Governor Friend Richardson appointed Sullivan to a vacancy left by the July 1926 death of William P. Lawlor. On January 3, 1927, Sullivan gave up the seat to the election winner, William Langdon. After stepping down from the court, Sullivan returned to private practice with this brother, along with former Governor Hiram W. Johnson, Theodore Roche, and Edward I. Barry.

== Bar activities ==
Sullivan was president of the San Francisco Bar Association from 1917 to 1924, and of the State Bar of California during 1923–1924. He was among the earliest advocates for the creation of an integrated state bar as it took shape in 1917.

== Honors and awards ==
In 1905, St. Ignatius College conferred the honorary degree of LL.D. on Sullivan. In September 1912, when St. Ignatius began its law school, Sullivan lectured in law while his brother, Matt, became the school's dean.

== Personal life ==
On September 13, 1876, Sullivan married Helen M. Bliss in San Francisco, and they had five children. She died December 30, 1918. Sullivan died at his home on January 23, 1928. A grandson, Robert P. Sullivan, was a graduate of the University of California, Hastings College of the Law (class of 1936), and a San Francisco County Superior Court judge from 1961 to 1971.

== See also ==
- List of justices of the Supreme Court of California

Legal offices
Preceded by William P. Lawlor	Associate Justice of the California Supreme Court; 1926–1927	Succeeded by William Langdon
