= William H. Beatty =

American judge

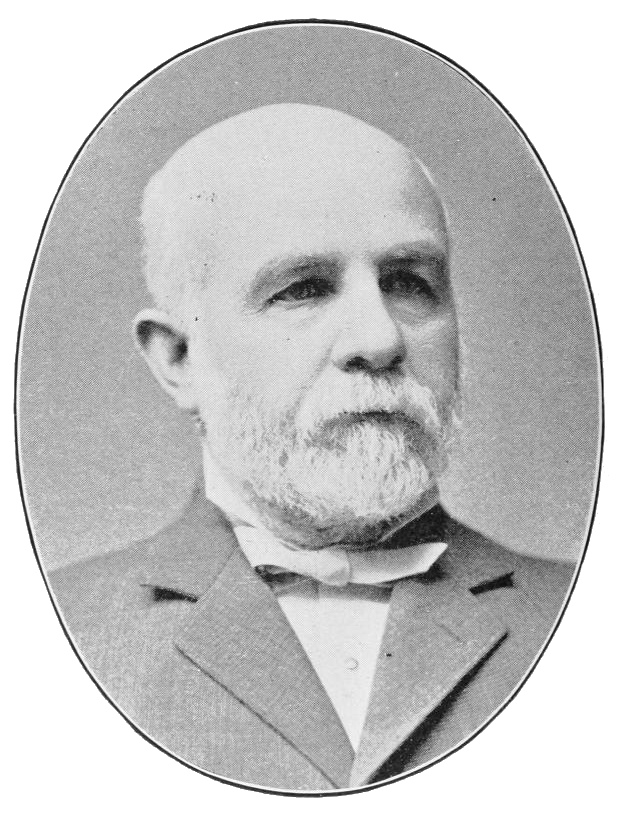

15th Chief Justice of the California Supreme Court
- In office January 1889 – August 4, 1914
- Appointed by: Elected
- Preceded by: Niles Searls
- Succeeded by: Matt I. Sullivan

Chief Justice of the Nevada Supreme Court
- In office January 6, 1879 – January 3, 1881
- Preceded by: Thomas Porter Hawley
- Succeeded by: Thomas Porter Hawley

Justice of the Nevada Supreme Court
- In office January 1875 – January 6, 1879

Personal details
- Born: February 18, 1838 Monclova, Ohio, U.S.
- Died: August 4, 1914 (aged 76) San Francisco, California, U.S.
- Party: Republican
- Spouse: Elizabeth May Love (m. 1874)
- Parents: H. O. Beatty (father); Margaret Boone Runyan (mother)
- Education: University of Virginia (no degree)

William Henry Beatty (February 18, 1838 – August 4, 1914) was the 15th Chief Justice of California from 1889 to 1914. Previously, he was chief justice of the Nevada Supreme Court from 1879 to 1881.

== Early life and education ==
Beatty c. 1874

On February 18, 1838, Beatty was born in a small village of Monclova, Lucas County, Ohio (near Toledo) to H. O. Beatty and Margaret Boone Runyan. Around 1840, his family returned to Kentucky, where his parents were originally from. He attended public schools and in 1853, when he was 15 years old, his family moved to Sacramento, California and his father became a successful lawyer. When Beatty was 17 years old, he went East for his education and studied at the University of Virginia for two years, but did not receive a degree.

== Legal and judicial career ==
Returning to Sacramento, Beatty read law at his father's office and in 1861 was admitted to the California bar. In 1863, he moved to Nevada and was elected City Attorney of Austin, Nevada, and then from 1864 to 1874 as District Judge in the Sixth, Seventh, and then the Eighth Judicial Districts. At the same time, his father, Henry Oscar Beatty, moved to Nevada and in 1864 was elected a Justice of the Nevada Supreme Court. In November 1874, William Beatty was elected to the Nevada Supreme Court and took his seat in January 1875. He served for six years on the Supreme Court, the last two as chief justice. In January 1881, soon after the conclusion of his term, Beatty returned to Sacramento and resumed a private practice.

Beatty (standing, second from right) with other Justices of the Supreme Court of California c. 1897–1898

In 1888, both the Republican and Union Labor parties placed Beatty on the ticket for the position of Chief Justice of the Supreme Court of California. He won the election, defeating Niles Searls (who was appointed Chief Justice in April 1887 by Governor Washington Bartlett) to complete the unexpired portion of the term of the previous Chief Justice Robert F. Morrison, who had died. The next year, in 1890, the Republican Party renominated Beatty and he won the election in November for a 12 year term beginning January 8, 1891. In November 1902, Beatty was re-elected as Chief Justice under the Republican ticket to another 12 year term, which would expire in 1915. Beatty held the position of Chief Justice for over 25 years until he died in office on August 4, 1914, and Matt I. Sullivan assumed the post.

In 1904, Beatty supported an amendment to the California Constitution to create three divisions of a Court of Appeals to reduce the case load of the Supreme Court.

== Honors and awards ==
On May 14, 1913, Beatty received an honorary degree of LL.D. from the University of California.

== Personal information ==
On June 17, 1874, at Hamilton, White Pine County, Nevada, Beatty married Elizabeth May ("Bessie") Love (born 1845), who was originally from Salisbury, North Carolina, and they had two children: H. Oscar Beatty (c. 1876 – April 14, 1935) and Alice Margaret Beatty (Wright) (born 1880).

== See also ==
- List of justices of the Supreme Court of Nevada
- List of justices of the Supreme Court of California
- Thomas Bard McFarland
- John D. Works
- Charles N. Fox
- John J. De Haven
- Charles H. Garoute
- Ralph C. Harrison
- William F. Fitzgerald

Legal offices
Preceded by Niles Searls	Chief Justice of California; 1889–1914	Succeeded by Matt I. Sullivan
Preceded by Thomas Porter Hawley	Chief Justice of the Nevada Supreme Court; 1879–1880	Succeeded by Thomas Porter Hawley
Preceded by Bernard C. Whitman	Justice of the Nevada Supreme Court; 1875–1879	Succeeded by Charles H. Belknap
