= John J. De Haven =

American judge (1845-1913)

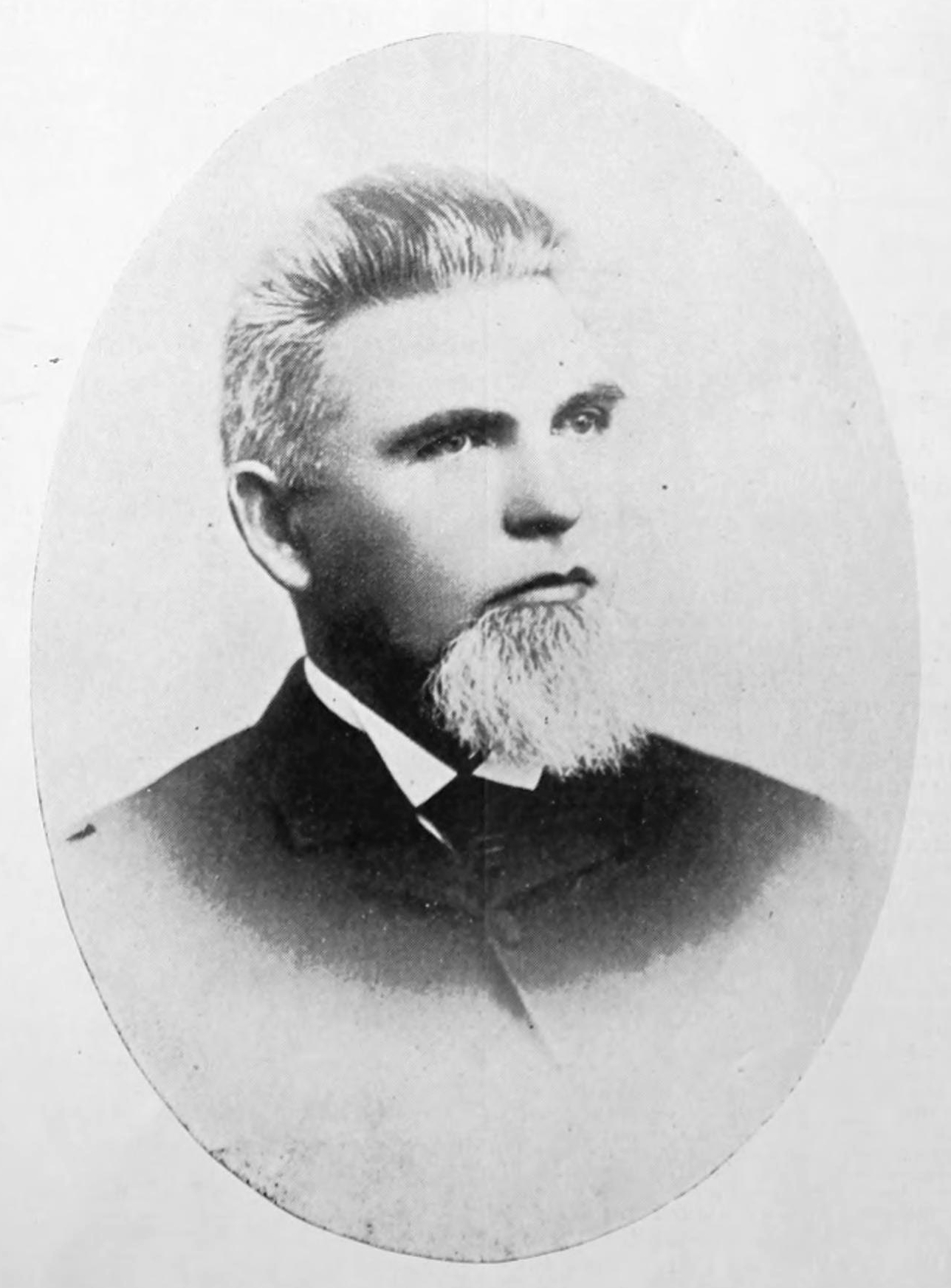
- De Haven c. 1894

Judge of the United States District Court for the Northern District of California
- In office June 8, 1897 – January 26, 1913
- Appointed by: William McKinley
- Preceded by: William W. Morrow
- Succeeded by: Maurice Timothy Dooling

Associate Justice of the California Supreme Court
- In office December 18, 1890 – January 7, 1895
- Preceded by: Charles N. Fox
- Succeeded by: Frederick W. Henshaw

Member of the U.S. House of Representatives from California's 1st district
- In office March 4, 1889 – October 1, 1890
- Preceded by: Thomas Larkin Thompson
- Succeeded by: Thomas J. Geary

Member of the California Senate
- In office 1871–1875

Member of the California State Assembly
- In office 1869–1871

District Attorney of Humboldt County
- In office 1867-1869
- Preceded by: G.W. Thompkins
- Succeeded by: James Hanna

Personal details
- Born: John Jefferson De Haven; March 12, 1845 St. Joseph, Missouri
- Died: January 26, 1913 (aged 67) Yountville, California
- Resting place: Mount Olivet Cemetery; San Francisco, California
- Party: Republican
- Education: read law

John Jefferson De Haven (also given as de Haven and DeHaven) (March 12, 1845 – January 26, 1913) was a United States representative from California, an associate justice of the California Supreme Court and a United States district judge of the United States District Court for the Northern District of California.

== Education and career ==
Born in St. Joseph, Buchanan County, Missouri, De Haven moved to California in 1853 with his parents, who settled in Humboldt County. He became a printer, and pursued that vocation for four years before he read law. In August 1865, he was a delegate from Humboldt County to the Union party state convention. He was admitted to the bar of the district court in Humboldt in 1866 and commenced practice at Eureka, California from 1866 to 1867. He was district attorney of Humboldt County from 1867 to 1869.

=== Public offices ===
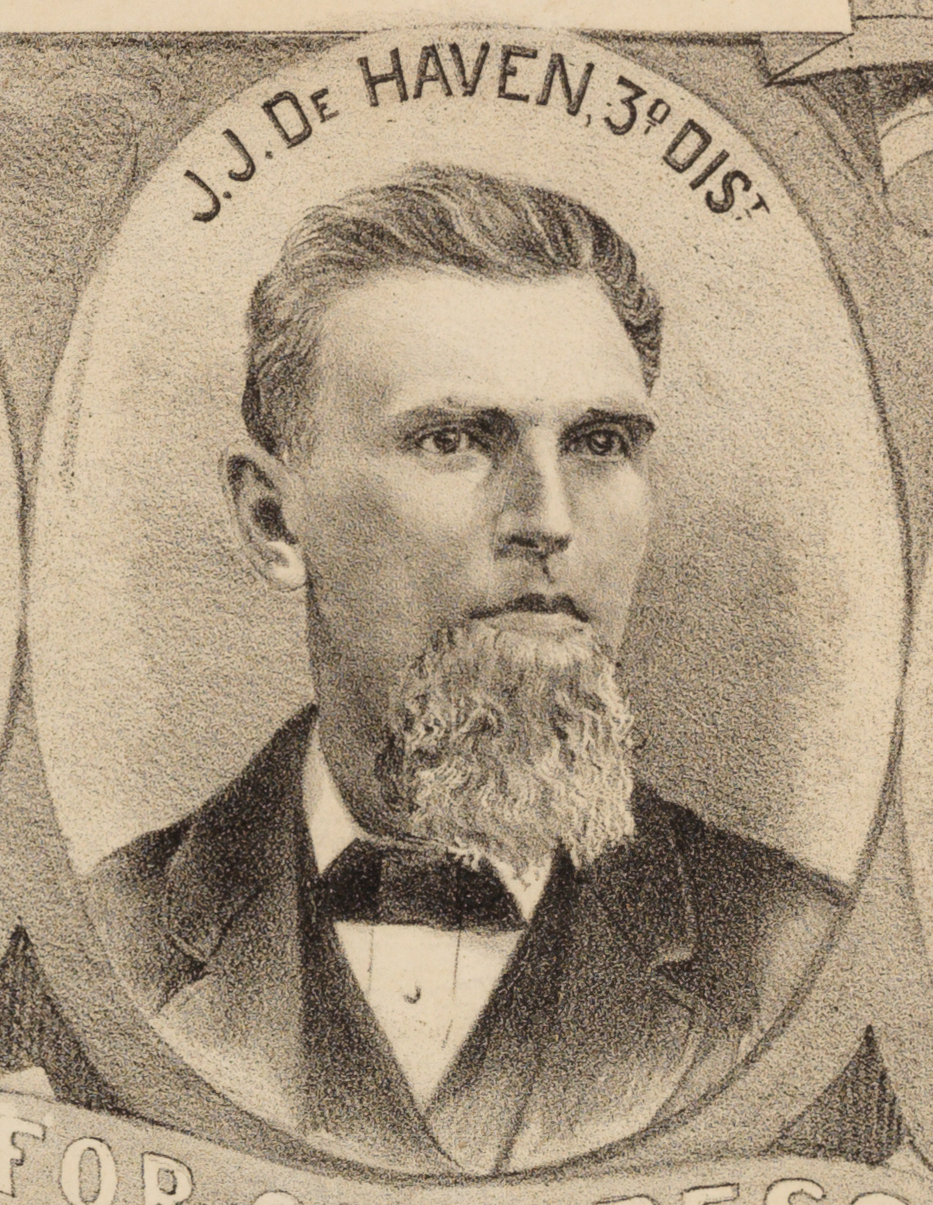
Engraving by Britton & Rey from a photograph by G. D. Morse, 1882

After entering the bar, De Haven held a series of public offices. He was a member from Humboldt County from 1869 to 1871 in the California State Assembly, and a member of the California State Senate from 1871 to 1875. He returned to private practice in Eureka from 1875 to 1884. He was the city attorney there from 1878 to 1880. He was an unsuccessful candidate for election in 1882 to the 48th United States Congress. He was a judge of the Humboldt County Superior Court from 1884 to 1889.

== Congressional service ==
In November 1888, De Haven was elected as a Republican to the United States House of Representatives of the 51st United States Congress from the California's 1st congressional district, and served from March 4, 1889, until October 1, 1890, when he resigned.

== Associate justice ==
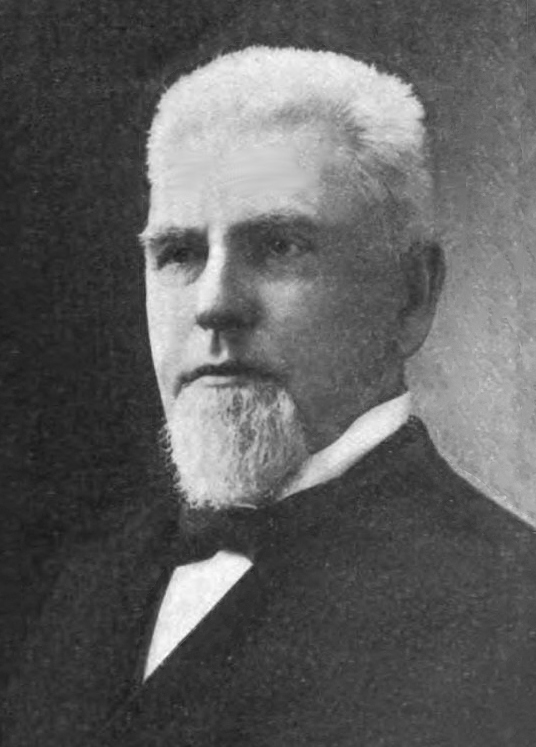
De Haven c. 1905

De Haven was an associate justice of the California Supreme Court from December 18, 1890, to January 7, 1895, filling the unexpired term of Charles N. Fox. In June 1894, he lost a bid for renomination at the Republican convention. After stepping down from the court, he returned to private practice in Eureka between 1895 and 1897.

== Federal judicial service ==
On June 1, 1897, President William McKinley nominated De Haven to a seat on the United States District Court for the Northern District of California vacated by Judge William W. Morrow, who had been elevated to the Ninth Circuit. De Haven was confirmed as a federal judge by the United States Senate on June 8, 1897, and received his commission the same day. He served on the federal bench until his death of apoplexy on January 26, 1913. His vacant seat was filled by the appointment of Judge Maurice Timothy Dooling. De Haven died in Yountville, California and was interred in Mount Olivet Cemetery in San Francisco, California.

== Personal ==
On June 24, 1872, De Haven married Zeruiah Jane Ball (January 3, 1848 – January 23, 1918) in Humboldt, California. They had a daughter, Sadie De Haven, and son, Joseph J. De Haven.

== Electoral history ==
1888 United States House of Representatives elections
Party	Candidate	Votes	%
Republican	John J. De Haven	19,345	49.9
Democratic	Thomas Larkin Thompson (Incumbent)	19,019	49.0
Know Nothing	W. D. Reynolds	428	1.1
Total votes		38,792	100.0
Republican gain from Democratic			

== See also ==
- List of justices of the Supreme Court of California

== Sources ==
U.S. House of Representatives
Preceded by Thomas Larkin Thompson	Member of the U.S. House of Representatives from California's 1st congressional district 1889–1890	Succeeded by Thomas J. Geary
Legal offices
Preceded by Charles N. Fox	Associate Justice of the California Supreme Court; 1890–1895	Succeeded by Frederick W. Henshaw
Preceded by William W. Morrow	Judge of the United States District Court for the Northern District of California; 1897–1913	Succeeded by Maurice Timothy Dooling
