= Marion Polk Angellotti =

American author

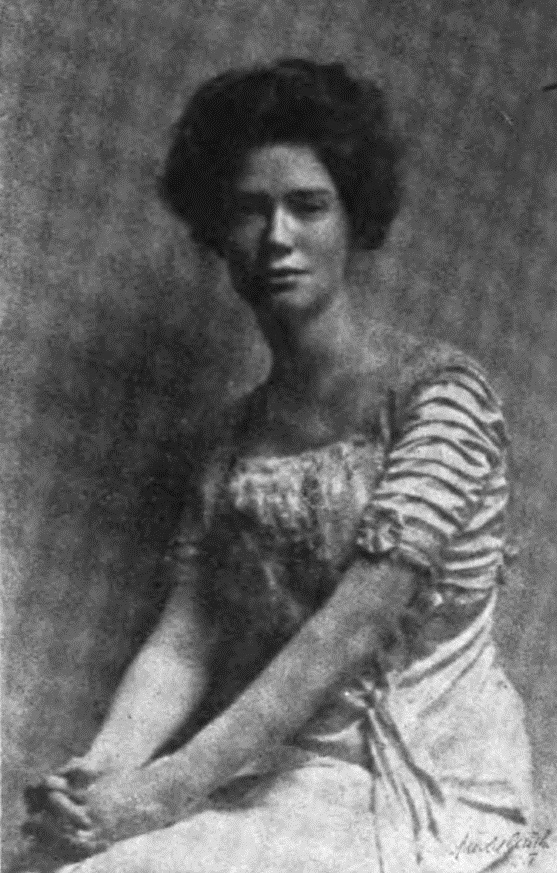

Marion Polk Angellotti (November 12, 1887 – April 1979) was an American author.

== Writings ==
She wrote short stories for pulp magazines such as Adventure, including several based on 14th-century condottiere John Hawkwood. Her novel The Firefly of France, based on the life of Georges Guynemer, was adapted to a film.

Her other novels are Sir John Hawkwood: A Tale of the White Company in Italy, The Three Bags, The Burgundian: A Tale of Old France, and Harlette (which is a retelling of her short story "When the Devil Ruled", which had been published in the April 1913 edition of The Smart Set magazine).

== Personal life ==
The daughter of Frank M. Angellotti, a judge, and his wife, Emma Cornelia Cearley (sometimes mistranscribed as Clearey), Marion Polk Angellotti served as a volunteer canteen worker with the American Red Cross from 1918 to 1919, being with an evacuation hospital during the Saint Michel offensive, and with the Army of Occupation in Germany.

She died in April 1979, aged 91, and was buried in Bellevue Memorial Park, Ontario, California.
