= Matt Sullivan =

American judge (1857–1937)

Matt Ignatius Sullivan
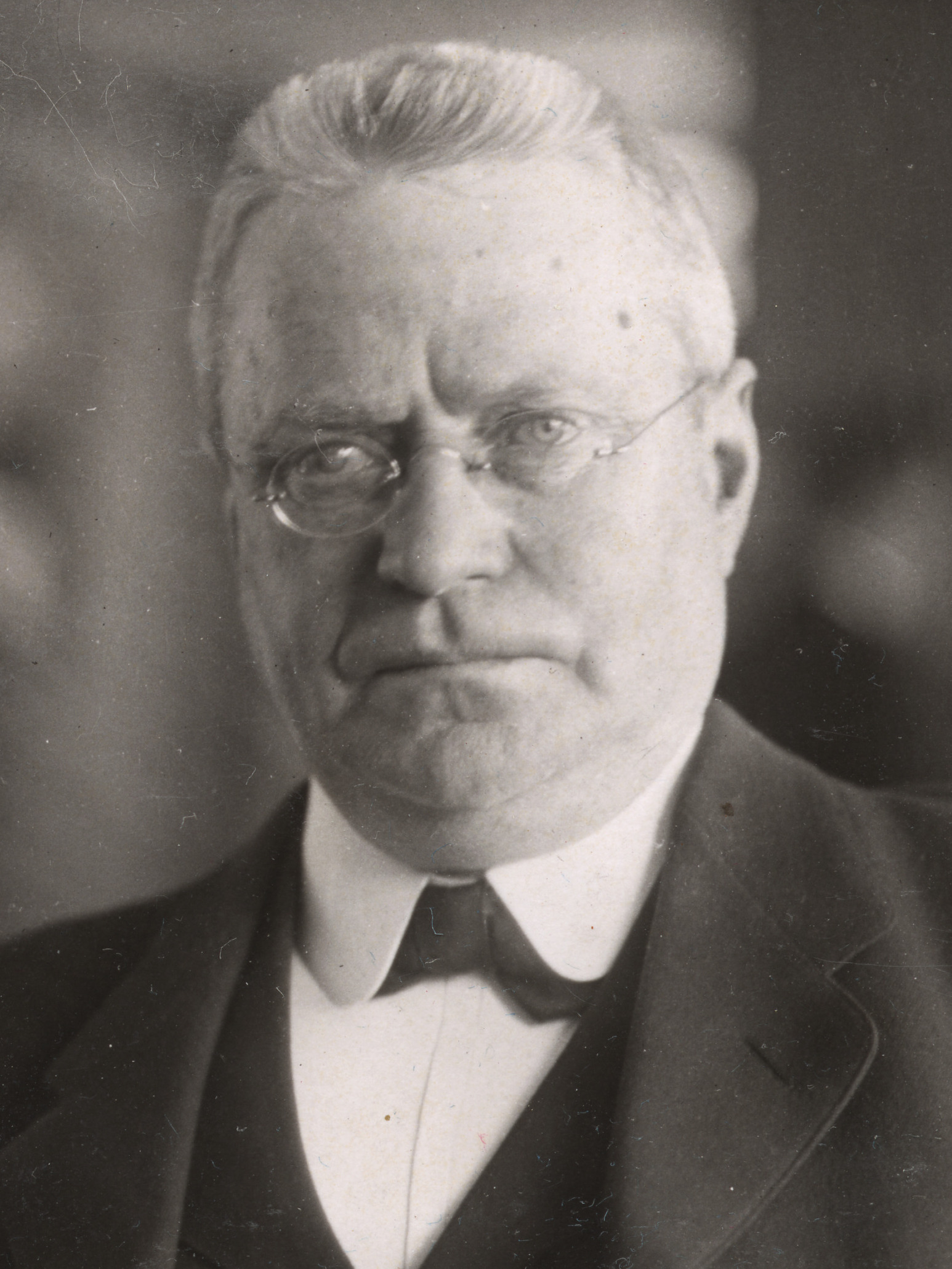
- Sullivan c. 1915

16th Chief Justice of California
- In office September 14, 1914 – January 4, 1915
- Appointed by: Hiram Johnson
- Preceded by: William H. Beatty
- Succeeded by: Frank M. Angellotti

Member of the San Francisco Board of Supervisors
- In office July 29, 1907 – January 8, 1908
- Appointed by: Edward Robeson Taylor
- Preceded by: Edward I. Walsh
- Succeeded by: Allan Pollok

Personal details
- Born: November 3, 1857 Grass Valley, California, U.S.
- Died: August 6, 1937 (aged 79) San Francisco, California, U.S.
- Education: St. Ignatius College (University of San Francisco) (AB)

Matt Ignatius Sullivan (November 3, 1857 – August 6, 1937) was the 16th Chief Justice of California. Appointed by Governor Hiram Johnson, Sullivan served from August 22, 1914, to January 4, 1915.

== Biography ==
Members of the Panama–Pacific International Exposition State Commission c. 1912–1915

Sullivan was born in Grass Valley, California, one of eight children of Michael M. and Margaret Sullivan. In 1863, the family moved to the Mission District of San Francisco. He attended public and parochial schools, graduating with an A.B. degree from St. Ignatius College (later named University of San Francisco). He then studied law at University of California, Hastings College of the Law in the first class, though he left in November 1879 without graduating. He continued reading law with his older brother, Jeremiah F. Sullivan, who also served as a judge of the San Francisco County Superior Court and on the California Supreme Court (the only instance where siblings have served on that court). He acted as attorney to San Francisco Sheriff John J. McDade, who served from 1893 to 1895.

In 1879, Sullivan was admitted to the Bar, became known as a skilled trial attorney, and in 1889 joined his brother in the firm of Sullivan & Sullivan. By 1912, San Francisco Police Commissioner Theodore J. Roche joined the law firm, renamed Sullivan, Sullivan & Roche. Sullivan rose to prominence in the aftermath of the 1906 San Francisco earthquake when he and childhood friend, James Rolph Jr., set up emergency aid stations in the neighborhoods. Afterwards, Sullivan and Senator Hiram Johnson prosecuted the famous post-fire bribe and graft case against San Francisco supervisor, Abe Ruef. In July 1913, Sullivan was appointed a special prosecutor with the United States Attorney's Office. When Johnson later became Governor, he appointed Sullivan to the Supreme Court in September 1914. On November 3, 1914, Sullivan was elected for the remainder of the short term expiring January 4, 1915.

After stepping down from the bench, Sullivan resumed private practice, remained active in politics, and led a series of civic improvements. When his friend James Rolph became first Mayor of San Francisco from 1912 to 1931, and then Governor of California from 1931 until 1934, Sullivan served as a close political advisor.

== Law school dean ==
From September 1912, Sullivan served as the first dean of the law school at St. Ignatius (University of San Francisco) until his death in 1937.

== Personal life ==
A bachelor, he lived with his brother, John, and sister, Mary McCarthy.

== See also ==
- List of justices of the Supreme Court of California

Legal offices
Preceded by William H. Beatty	Chief Justice of California; 1914–1915	Succeeded by Frank M. Angellotti
