= Lucien Shaw =

American judge and politician (1845-1933)

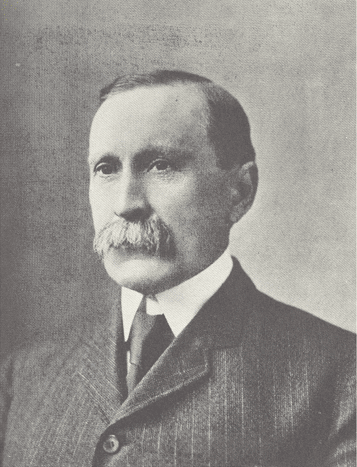

18th Chief Justice of the California Supreme Court
- In office November 14, 1921 – January 13, 1923
- Appointed by: Governor William Stephens
- Preceded by: Frank M. Angellotti
- Succeeded by: Curtis D. Wilbur

Associate Justice of the California Supreme Court
- In office January 5, 1903 – November 14, 1921
- Appointed by: Elected
- Preceded by: Charles H. Garoute
- Succeeded by: William H. Waste

Personal details
- Born: March 1, 1845 Vevay, Switzerland County, Indiana, U.S.
- Died: March 19, 1933 (aged 88) Glendale, California, U.S.
- Party: Republican

Lucien Shaw (March 1, 1845 – March 19, 1933) was the 18th Chief Justice of California and a prominent Republican politician in California during the early 20th century.

== Biography ==
Shaw was born on a farm in Vevay, Switzerland County, Indiana, and attended public schools. Shaw studied for one year at the Indianapolis Law College, graduating in March 1869.

After graduation, Shaw engaged in private practice in Greene County, Indiana. In December 1883, he moved to Los Angeles and then Fresno for two years. In October 1885, he was admitted to the California bar. In September 1887, Shaw became a director of the county law library. Shaw maintained law firms first in Fresno and then, after 1886, in Los Angeles with J. M. Damron in Shaw & Damron. Shaw's partner was elected to the State Assembly, and put forward Shaw's name for appointment to the bench. In March 1889, Governor Robert Waterman appointed Shaw to a new seat on the Los Angeles County Superior Court. On the trial bench, Shaw served with future Supreme Court justice Walter Van Dyke. The following year, in November 1890, Shaw ran and won election for a term of six years. In 1896, he was re-elected to another six-year term to the Superior Court. Between 1901-1902, Shaw served as the president of the Los Angeles County Bar Association.

In November 1902, Shaw was elected after a nomination by the Republican Party to fill an open seat as an Associate Justice of the Supreme Court of California. At the same time, Frank M. Angellotti was elected on the Republican ticket. In November 1914, Shaw was re-elected to another 12-year term. In January 1915, Angellotti became Chief Justice, serving six years until resigning to resume private practice in November 1921. To fill the position, Governor William Stephens appointed Shaw as Chief Justice, and he was sworn in on November 15, 1921. He held the seat until expiration of his term in January 1923, when he stepped down. Shaw was an expert in water law, and his notable cases include Palmer v. The Railroad Commission (1914), Duckworth v. Watsonville Water Company (1915), and Katz v. Walkinshaw (1903), concerning the rights of common users of aquifers.

After Shaw retired from the court, he engaged in private practice and joined the Pacific Mutual Life Insurance Company's Board of Directors. In 1922, he received an honorary LL.D. from the University of California, Berkeley.

== Personal life ==
On July 29, 1873, Shaw married Hannah J. Hartley, in Raisin City, Michigan, and they had one child. Shaw resided in Hermosa Beach, California, and died on March 19, 1933, in Glendale, California. Shaw's son, Hartley, was a judge on the Los Angeles Superior Court from 1923.

== See also ==
- List of justices of the Supreme Court of California

Legal offices
Preceded by Frank M. Angellotti	18th Chief Justice of California; 1921 – 1923	Succeeded by Curtis D. Wilbur
Preceded by Charles H. Garoute	Associate Justice of the California Supreme Court; 1902 – 1921	Succeeded by William H. Waste
