= Jesse W. Curtis Sr. =

American judge (1865–1960)

Jesse William Curtis Sr.
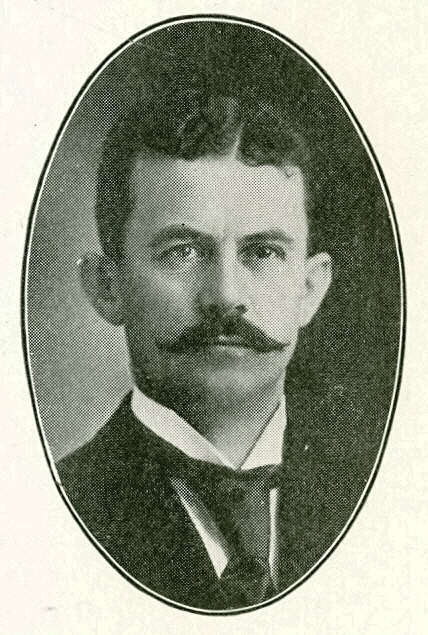

Associate Justice of the Supreme Court of California
- In office January 1, 1926 – January 1, 1945
- Appointed by: Governor Friend W. Richardson
- Preceded by: William H. Waste
- Succeeded by: Homer R. Spence

Associate Justice of the California Court of Appeal, Second Appellate District, Division One
- In office March 26, 1923 – December 31, 1925
- Appointed by: Governor Friend W. Richardson

Personal details
- Born: July 18, 1865 San Bernardino, California, U.S.
- Died: October 5, 1960 (aged 95) San Bernardino, California, U.S.
- Spouse: Ida Lucinda Seymour (m. 1892; died 1960)
- Children: Jesse William Curtis Jr. Margaret Curtis Chadwell; Helen Curtis Shepardson
- Education: University of Southern California (PhB); University of Michigan Law School (LLB)

Jesse William Curtis Sr. (July 18, 1865 – October 5, 1960) was an American attorney who served as an associate justice of the Supreme Court of California from January 1, 1926 to January 1, 1945, and whose family were pioneer settlers of San Bernardino, California.

== Early life and education ==
Curtis was born on July 18, 1865, in San Bernardino, California, to William Jesse Curtis and Frances Sophia Cowles. They had arrived in 1864 after traveling on the Oregon Trail from Iowa as members of the Pella Company wagon train that included the family of Wyatt Earp.

Curtis's family has a long association with the law. Curtis's father was a teacher and lawyer who helped found the San Bernardino County Bar Association in 1875. Curtis's grandfather, I. C. Curtis, was a lawyer and a member of the Iowa Legislature. Curtis's uncle, William S. Holman, was a Democratic Congressman from Indiana, and Curtis's great-grandfather on his mother's side, Jesse Lynch Holman, sat on the first Indiana Supreme Court and was later a United States District Court judge. Curtis's son, Jesse William Curtis Jr., became a federal court judge, as well.

In 1887, Curtis graduated with a Ph.B. in the first class that went completely through the University of Southern California (he was eventually their oldest living alumnus). In 1891, he received a LL.B. from the University of Michigan Law School. He then began private practice in San Bernardino with his father at Curtis, Oster & Curtis, and its progeny, where he remained for 23 years, except for a stint from 1899 to 1903 serving as District Attorney of San Bernardino County.

== Judicial career ==
In 1915, Curtis was named Judge of the Superior Court of San Bernardino County. On March 26, 1923, Governor Friend W. Richardson elevated Curtis to the District Court of Appeal, Second Appellate District, Division One, where he served three years. On January 1, 1926, Governor Richardson named Curtis an associate justice of the Supreme Court of California, filling the seat of William H. Waste, who was named chief justice. In November 1926, Curtis won election to a full, 12-year term. In 1938, Curtis received 70.9% of the vote in a retention election.

Among Curtis's notable cases were a pair of contempt citations for commenting on judicial proceedings: the first against longshoremen union leader Harry Bridges, and the second against the Los Angeles Times. In 1939, the California Supreme Court, in a 5-1 opinion in Bridges v. Superior Court of Los Angeles, affirmed the judgment of contempt. In an opinion by Curtis, the court rejected Bridges' contention that he had a First Amendment right to criticize the court. On January 31, 1940, in a 5-2 decision by Curtis, the court also upheld the contempt ruling against the Times. Upon appeal, in a 5-4 opinion by Justice Hugo Black, the U.S. Supreme Court reversed in Bridges v. California.

After retiring from the Supreme Court in 1945, Curtis returned to private practice with his son in San Bernardino.

== Awards and legacy ==
In 1934, Curtis was awarded the Asa Call alumnus achievement trophy by the University of Southern California. He was bestowed honorary law degrees in 1926 by the University of Southern California, in 1928 by Southwestern University, and by the University of Redlands, where his three children had studied and he was a trustee from 1909.

== Personal life ==
On June 23, 1892, Curtis married Ida Lucinda Seymour (July 22, 1870 – February 15, 1960) and they had three children: Jesse William Curtis Jr.; Margaret Curtis Chadwell, a graduate of the University of Redlands and Radcliffe College; and Helen Curtis Shepardson, who also attended the University of Redlands.

== See also ==
- List of justices of the Supreme Court of California

Political offices
Preceded by William H. Waste	Associate Justice the Supreme Court of California; 1926–1945	Succeeded by Homer R. Spence
Preceded by	Associate Justice of the California Court of Appeal, Second Appellate District, Division One; 1923–1925	Succeeded by
