= William P. Lawlor =

American judge (1854-1926)

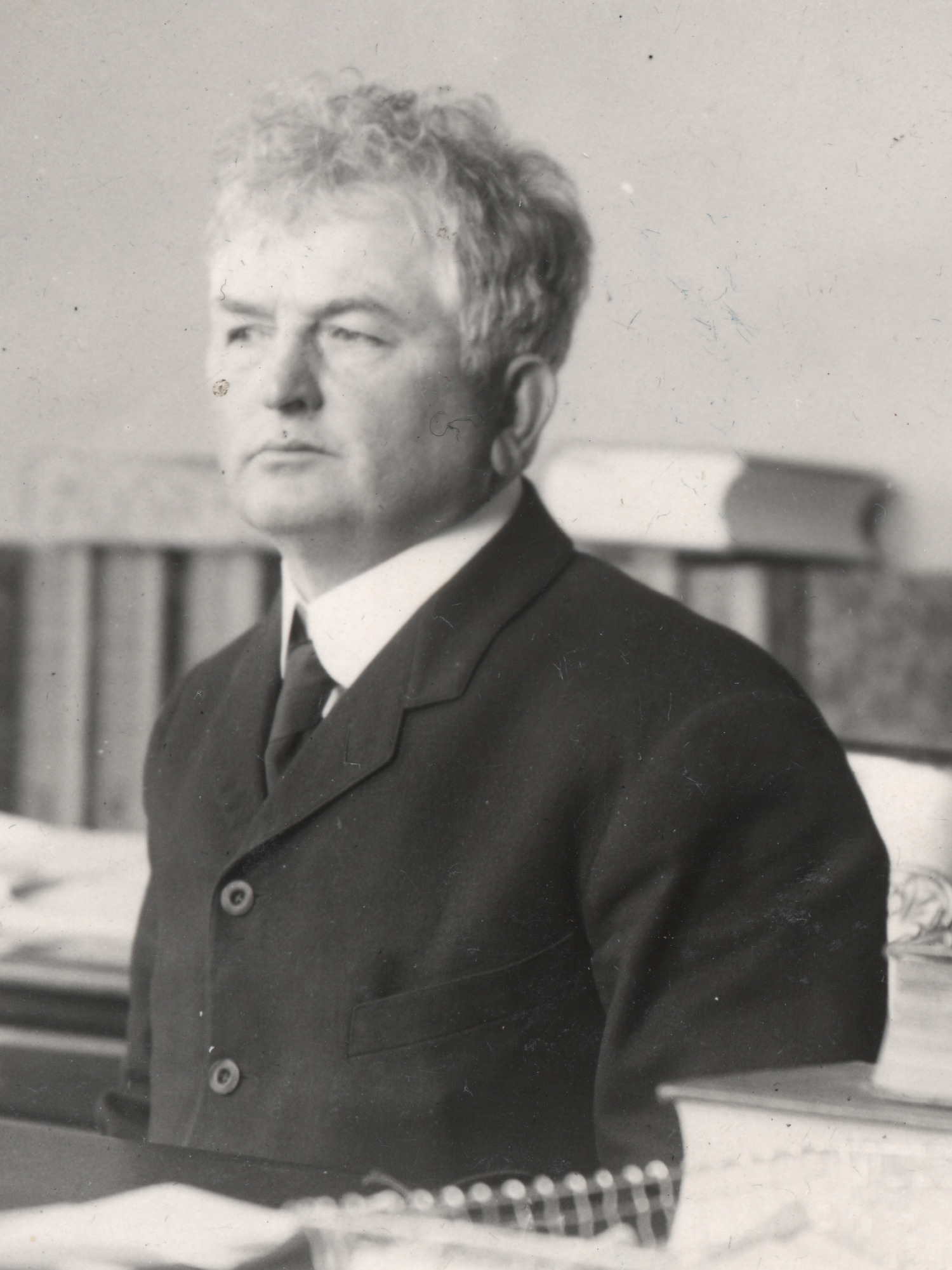
- Lawlor in 1911

Associate Justice of the Supreme Court of California
- In office January 3, 1915 – July 25, 1926
- Appointed by: Direct election
- Preceded by: Frank M. Angellotti
- Succeeded by: Jeremiah F. Sullivan

Judge of the San Francisco County Superior Court
- In office December 16, 1898 – January 2, 1915
- Appointed by: Governor James Budd
- Preceded by: Rhodes Borden
- Succeeded by: Franklin A. Griffin

Personal details
- Born: September 17, 1854 Manhattan, New York City, U.S.
- Died: July 24, 1926 (aged 71) San Francisco, California, U.S.
- Party: Democratic
- Spouse: Mary Lee Henry (m. 1913)
- Education: University of California, Hastings College of Law (no degree)
- Profession: Attorney, judge

William Patrick Lawlor (September 17, 1854 – July 24, 1926) was an associate justice of the California Supreme Court from January 3, 1915, to July 25, 1926.

== Biography ==
Lawlor was born in Manhattan, New York City, New York, on September 17, 1854, the son of Irish immigrants, Patrick Lawlor and Eliza Maher. Orphaned by the time he was 10 years of age, he received three years of public education in New York before coming to live with his uncle in Paterson, New Jersey, after his parents' death. In Paterson, he worked days as a bobbin boy in the textile factories, and attended night classes. In 1877, Lawlor moved to California and worked in the silver mines in Napa. In 1885, he moved to San Francisco and became involved in Democratic party politics.

He was a member of the Bohemian Club and The Family club, as well as one of the five co-founders of The Commonwealth Club. He lived at 545 Powell Street, San Francisco.

== Legal career ==
Lawlor c. 1894

Beginning at age 30, Lawlor studied law at University of California, Hastings College of Law, 1885-1887, and in the offices of Rhodes & Barstow and Dennis Spencer in San Francisco, California. (Augustus L. Rhodes was chief justice of California from 1870 to 1872.) On December 16, 1898, Governor James Budd named Lawlor, then age 40, a judge of the San Francisco County Superior Court. He was re-elected to the bench in 1900, 1906 and 1912. As a Superior Court judge, Lawlor dismissed indictments in the San Francisco trolley bribery cases against officials of the United Railroads.

In 1910, Lawlor ran unsuccessfully against Republican candidate Henry A. Melvin for the California Supreme Court. In 1914, Lawlor was elected an associate justice of the California Supreme Court, replacing Frank M. Angellotti who was elected chief justice. Lawlor served in that position from January 3, 1915, until his death on July 25, 1926. In 1922, Lawlor ran against Curtis D. Wilbur for the position of chief justice, but lost.

== Personal life ==
On November 25, 1913, Lawlor married Mary Lee Henry. The couple had no children.

== Selected works ==
- Lawlor, William P. (1911). "Needed Reforms in Criminal Law and Procedure". J. Crim. L. & Criminology. 1 (6): 877–892. doi:10.2307/1132713. JSTOR 1132713.

== See also ==
- List of justices of the Supreme Court of California

Political offices
Preceded by Frank M. Angellotti	Associate Justice the Supreme Court of California; 1915–1926	Succeeded by Jeremiah F. Sullivan
