= Ralph C. Harrison =

American judge (1833–1918)

Ralph Chandler Harrison
- Harrison c. 1904

Associate Justice of the California Supreme Court
- In office December 20, 1890 – January 5, 1903
- Appointed by: Direct election
- Preceded by: John D. Works
- Succeeded by: Frank M. Angellotti

Presiding Justice of the First District California Court of Appeal
- In office January 1905 – 1908
- Appointed by: Governor George Pardee
- Preceded by: New seat
- Succeeded by: James A. Cooper

Personal details
- Born: October 22, 1833 Cornwall, Connecticut, U.S.
- Died: July 18, 1918 (aged 84) San Francisco, California, U.S.
- Spouses: Juliet Waite (m. 1865; died 1890) Ella Spencer Reid (m. 1892)
- Children: 3
- Education: Wesleyan University (BA, MA); Albany Law School (LLB)

Ralph Chandler Harrison (October 22, 1833 – July 18, 1918) was an American attorney and Associate Justice of the Supreme Court of California from December 20, 1890, to January 5, 1903.

== Early life ==
On October 22, 1838, Harrison was born in Cornwall, Connecticut. He attended Wesleyan University, graduating with a B.A. in 1853.

After graduation, he taught mathematics and ancient languages at Armenia Seminary, New York, from 1853 to 1856, and also obtained a M.A. degree at Wesleyan in 1856. In 1857, he was elected to the Connecticut State Legislature. He then studied at Albany Law School, where he was awarded a LL.B. in 1859.

== Career ==
Harrison (seated, right) with other Justices of the Supreme Court of California c. 1897–1898

Harrison's law school classmate, David D. Colton, encouraged Harrison to move to California and in 1859 the two formed a law partnership in San Francisco. In 1868, Harrison joined with Yale Law School-trained attorney, John R. Jarboe, in the firm of Jarboe & Harrison.

In August 1890, Harrison won the nomination of the Republican Party for Supreme Court justice, and was elected to a 12-year term. In November 1902, Harrison sought a second term but lost the Republican nomination to Frank M. Angellotti.

In December 1903, Harrison was named a commissioner of the California Supreme Court, replacing John Haynes. In 1905, when the new Court of Appeal was established, Governor George Pardee named Harrison as the Presiding Justice of the First District.

After stepping down from the bench in 1908, Harrison returned to private practice. He continued as trustee of the public and law libraries of San Francisco. In October 1917, Harrison and his wife (Ella Spencer Reid) visited Carmel-by-the-Sea and stayed at the La Playa Hotel for a few weeks. During this visit they bought the block between Camino Real and Casanova Street, south of Ninth Avenue.

== Death ==
Harrison died after a brief illness, at the age of 84, on July 18, 1918, at his apartment in San Francisco.

== Bar and civic activities ==
Harrison was a member of the San Francisco Bar Association, and served as a trustee of the San Francisco Law Library in 1871. In January 1884, Harrison was elected a trustee of the California Academy of Sciences. In April 1896, he was named president of the board of the San Francisco Public Library. The Harrison Memorial Library in Carmel, California, is named in his honor.

== Personal life ==
Harrison married twice. In July 1865, he married Juliet Lathrop Waite and they had two sons, both of whom became attorneys: Richard Chandler Harrison, who practiced with his father in the firm of Harrison & Harrison; and Robert Waite Harrison, an assistant district attorney. After her death in August 1890, Harrison married again in September 1892 to the younger Ella Spencer Reid in Rye, New York, at the country mansion of her uncle, Whitelaw Reid, later ambassador to the United Kingdom. His wife became involved with several art and literary societies in San Francisco.

Harrison was a member of the Bohemian Club in 1872.

== See also ==
- List of justices of the Supreme Court of California

Legal offices
Preceded by John D. Works	Associate Justice of the California Supreme Court; 1889–1903	Succeeded by Frank M. Angellotti
Preceded by New seat	Presiding Justice of the First District, California Court of Appeal; 1905-1908	Succeeded by James A. Cooper
