= Frank M. Angellotti =

American judge (1861-1932)

Frank Marion Angellotti
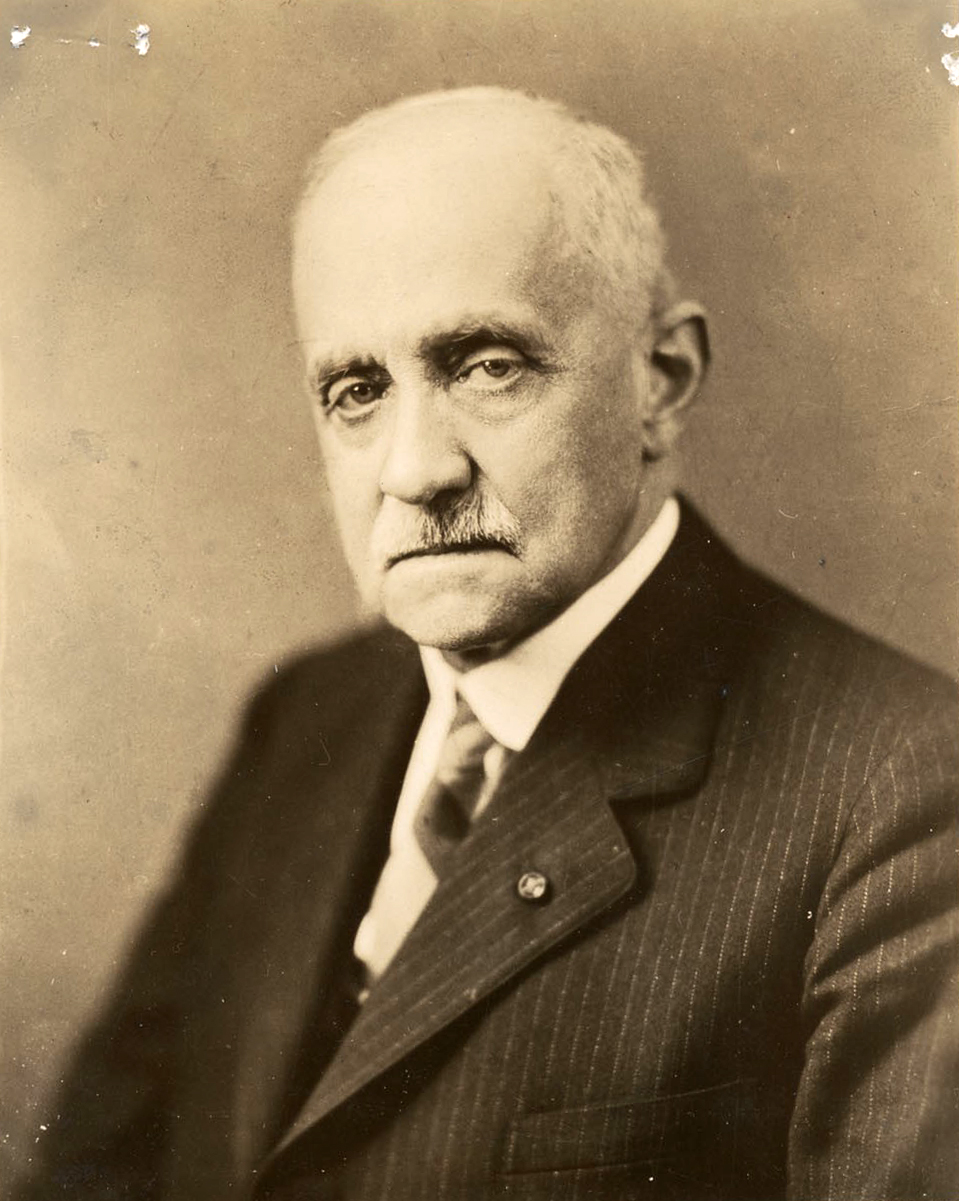

17th Chief Justice of the California Supreme Court
- In office January 5, 1915 – November 15, 1921
- Appointed by: Elected
- Preceded by: Matt I. Sullivan
- Succeeded by: Lucien Shaw

Associate Justice of the California Supreme Court
- In office December 11, 1902 – January 4, 1915
- Appointed by: Elected
- Preceded by: Ralph C. Harrison
- Succeeded by: William P. Lawlor

Personal details
- Born: September 4, 1861 San Rafael, California, U.S.
- Died: May 23, 1932 (aged 70) San Francisco, California, U.S.
- Party: Republican
- Spouse: Emma Cornelia Cearley (m. 1884)
- Education: University of California, Hastings College of the Law (LLB)

Frank Marion Angellotti (September 4, 1861 – May 23, 1932), was an American attorney who served as the 17th Chief Justice of the California Supreme Court from January 5, 1915 to November 1921, and as an associate justice from December 11, 1902, to January 4, 1915.

== Biography ==
Angellotti was born in San Rafael, California, son of Giuseppe and Lois Frances (Osgood) Angellotti. His father was an Italian merchant and land owner of Marin County, California, from 1852 until his death. His mother was descended from Christopher Osgood, who came from Marlborough, England, on the ship Mary and John in 1633 and settled at Ipswich, Massachusetts. He attended private schools in San Rafael and was educated at Boys High School in San Francisco. He graduated from the University of California, Hastings College of the Law in 1882 with the degree of LL.B.; was admitted to the California bar in the same year, and established a successful practice in San Rafael.

He was district attorney for Marin County during 1885 to 1891. In 1891, he became judge of the superior court for a term of twelve years. He was associate justice of the Supreme Court of California during December 11, 1902, to January 4, 1915, serving in Department One with justices Lucien Shaw and Walter Van Dyke, later replaced by M. C. Sloss. In November 1914, Angellotti ran successfully for chief justice to replace retiring William H. Beatty, and held the post from January 5, 1915, to November 15, 1921. His notable cases include In re Terui (1921), and In re Kotta (1921), in which he wrote the opinion striking down the alien poll tax adopted in the previous session of the California legislature.

After his resignation, he became general counsel for the Western Pacific Railroad Company, a position previously held by his court colleague Warren Olney Jr.

== Bar and civic activities ==
Starting in 1918 he was lieutenant-governor for California of the Society of Colonial Wars. He was grand master of California Masons during 1898-99 and was also a member of the American Bar Association, California State Bar Association and the Marin County Bar Association.

== Personal life ==
Angellotti was married December 27, 1884, to Emma Cornelia Cearley, daughter of Edmund and Lucretia (Polk) Cearley, of Irvington, California. They had two children: Frances Louise (died in infancy) and Marion Polk Angellotti, an author. Frank Angellotti died on May 23, 1932, and was buried at Mount Tamalpais Cemetery in San Rafael.

== See also ==
- List of justices of the Supreme Court of California

Legal offices
Preceded by Matt I. Sullivan	17th Chief Justice of California; 1915–1921	Succeeded by Lucien Shaw
Preceded by Ralph C. Harrison	Associate Justice the Supreme Court of California; 1903–1915	Succeeded by William P. Lawlor
