= Henry A. Melvin =

American judge (1865–1920)

Henry Alexander Melvin
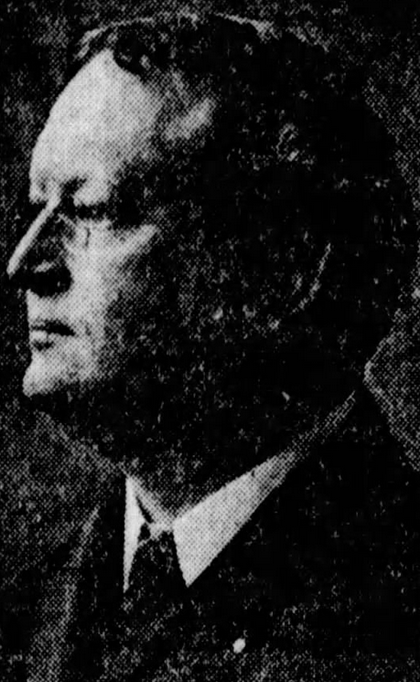

Associate Justice of the California Supreme Court
- In office September 28, 1908 – December 1920
- Appointed by: Direct election
- Preceded by: Thomas B. McFarland
- Succeeded by: William A. Sloane

Personal details
- Born: September 28, 1865 Springfield, Illinois, U.S.
- Died: April 24, 1920 (aged 54) Sacramento, California, U.S.
- Spouse: Sarah Louise Morse (m. 1893)
- Education: University of California, Berkeley (B.Phil.); University of California, Hastings College of the Law (LL.B.)

Henry Alexander Melvin (September 28, 1865 – April 24, 1920) was an associate justice of the Supreme Court of California from September 28, 1908, to April 1920.

== Biography ==
Melvin was born at Springfield, Illinois, on September 28, 1865, to Samuel and Sarah Melvin, the youngest of four children. In 1874, when he was nine years old, his family moved to St. Helena, California. In 1878, his parents moved to Oakland where his father, a retired medical practitioner, opened a pharmacy. Henry attended the University of California, Berkeley, while assisting his father to earn his school fees, graduating with a B.Phil. in 1889. In April 1890, he was elected census marshal by the Oakland Board of Education.

Melvin then enrolled in Hastings College of Law, receiving his LL.B. degree in 1892. While a student, he was elected and served as the Justice of the Peace of Brooklyn Township in Alameda County.

In 1893, Melvin became the assistant District Attorney of Alameda County. In 1894, he accepted a five-year term to serve as Prosecuting Attorney for the City of Oakland. He returned to Alameda County to serve as Chief Deputy District Attorney, except for a period of three months when he was acting Deputy Attorney General of California.

In 1901, Melvin accepted the position of Superior Court Judge of Alameda County. In November 1902, he was elected to a full term. In 1904, the Legislature approved creation of the Courts of Appeal and Melvin was considered for one of the seats in the Second District but not chosen by Governor George Pardee.

In September 1908, Melvin was nominated by the Republican Party and appointed by Governor James Gillett as an associate justice of the Supreme Court of California. He succeeded Thomas B. McFarland, who had died in office. In November 1910, Melvin was re-elected at expiration of McFarland's term to a 12-year term. On April 24, 1920, Melvin died while in office. In May 1920, his seat on the court was filled by appointment of William A. Sloane by Governor William Stephens for the term ending January 1923.

== Clubs ==
Melvin was a member of the Bohemian Club. He was also a member of the Elks, and a bass singer who performed in church and club events.

== Personal life ==
On June 14, 1893, he married Sarah Louise Morse of Portland, Oregon. He was survived by a son.

== See also ==
- List of justices of the Supreme Court of California

Legal offices
Preceded by Thomas B. McFarland	Associate Justice of the California Supreme Court; 1908–1920	Succeeded by William A. Sloane
