= 1913 Los Angeles mayoral election =

- May 6, 1913 and June 3, 1913
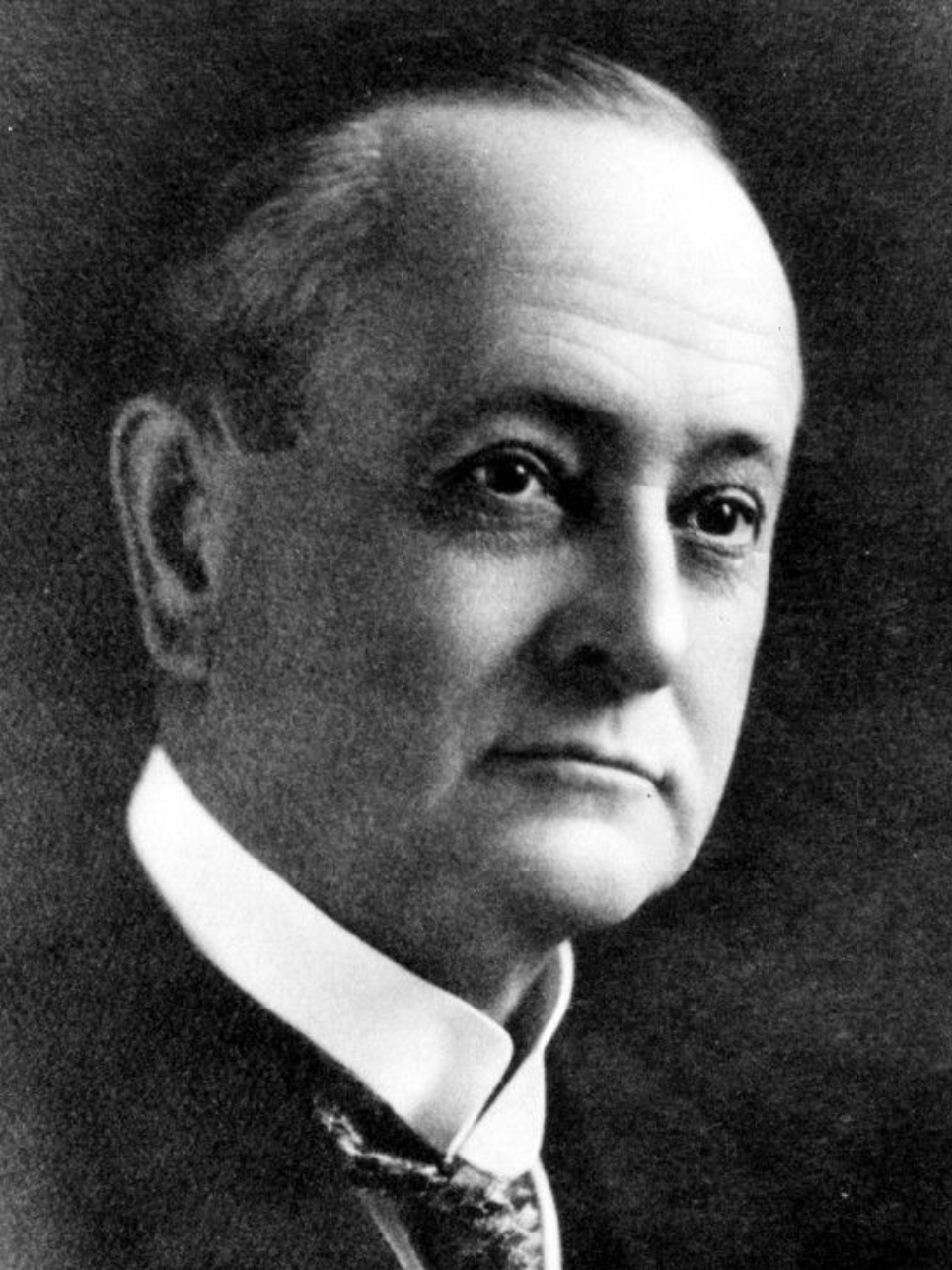

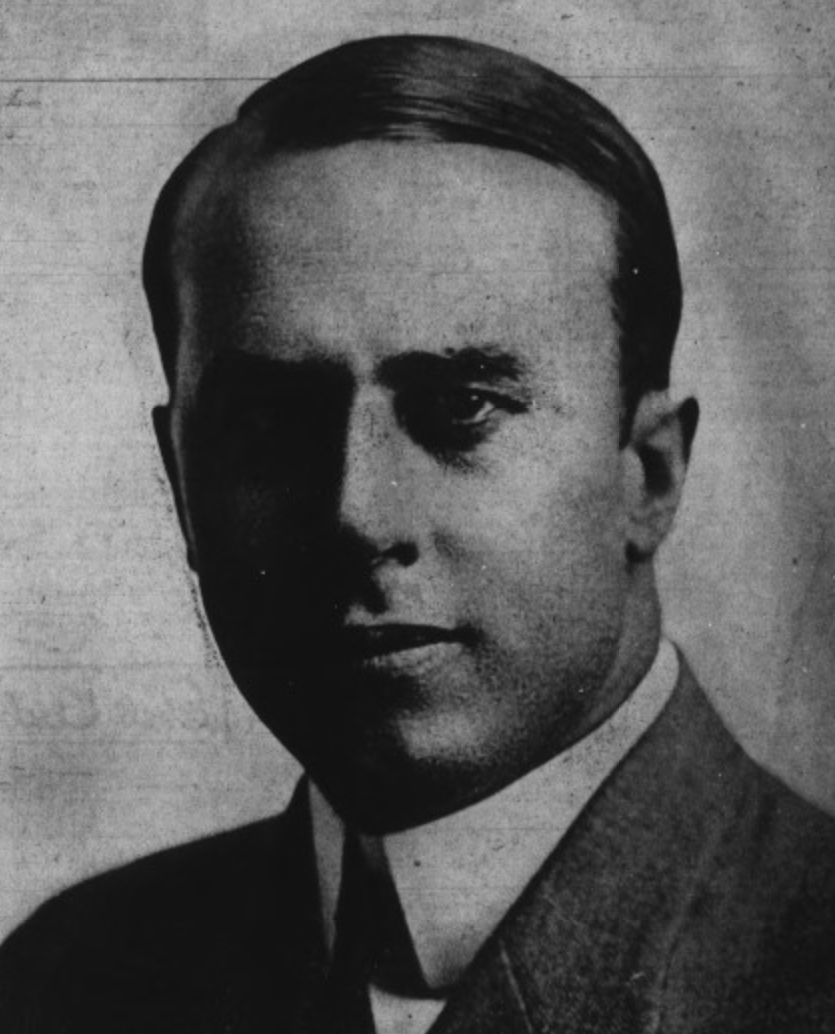

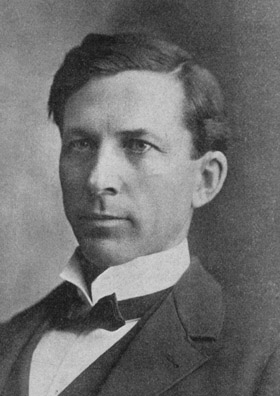
Candidate	Henry H. Rose	John W. Shenk	Job Harriman
First round	22,042; 28.01%	35,395; 44.98%	20,508; 26.06%
Runoff	46,045; 54.72%	38,109; 45.29%	Eliminated
Mayor before election
George Alexander
Elected Mayor
Henry H. Rose

The 1913 Los Angeles mayoral election took place on May 6, 1913, with a run-off election on June 3, 1913. George Alexander had retired from the job and police judge Henry H. Rose was elected over Los Angeles City Attorney John W. Shenk.

Municipal elections in California, including Mayor of Los Angeles, are officially nonpartisan; candidates' party affiliations do not appear on the ballot.

== Election ==
With the retirement of incumbent George Alexander, the seat was now open. Los Angeles City Attorney John W. Shenk, previous election candidate Job Harriman, and police judge Henry H. Rose ran in the primary. Shenk, Good Government Organization politician, was nominated and endorsed by the Municipal Conference while Harriman was again nominated by the Socialist Party. In the primary election, Harriman was eliminated when Independent politician Henry H. Rose led him by a small margin, meaning he would face Shenk in the general election.

In the runoff, many African-American newspapers urged the election of Rose due to Shenk's decision against C. W. Holden that caused discrimination against African-Americans. In the runoff, Rose won against Shenk at a time when African-Americans represented about fifteen thousand votes.

== Results ==
=== Primary election ===
Los Angeles mayoral primary election, May 6, 1913
Candidate	Votes	%
John W. Shenk	35,395	44.98
Henry H. Rose	22,042	28.01
Job Harriman	20,508	26.06
Henry Clay Needham	564	0.72
James O. Becker	184	0.23
Total votes	78,693	100.00

=== General election ===
Los Angeles mayoral general election, June 3, 1913
Candidate	Votes	%
Henry H. Rose	46,045	54.72
John W. Shenk	38,109	45.29
Total votes	84,154	100.00
