= Jess E. Stephens =

American attorney

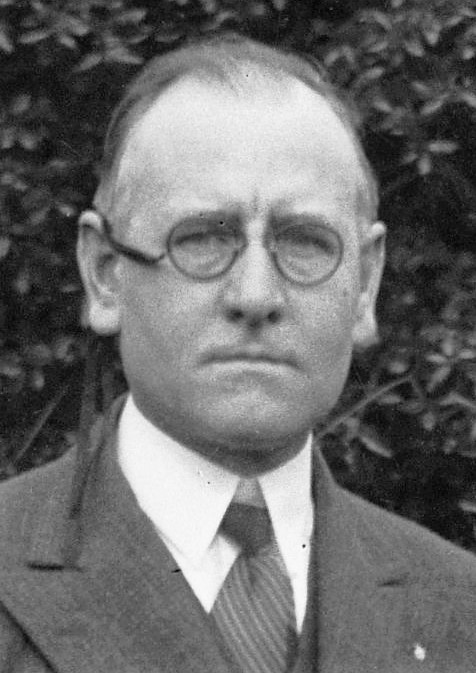
- Stephens in 1928

33rd Los Angeles City Attorney
- In office January 3, 1921 – June 30, 1929
- Preceded by: Charles S. Burnell
- Succeeded by: Erwin P. Werner

Personal details
- Born: May 4, 1882 State Line, Indiana, US
- Died: December 2, 1953 (aged 71) Los Angeles, California, US
- Spouse: Alice Bernice Cherry (m. 1907)
- Children: 2
- Relatives: Albert Lee Stephens Sr. (brother); Albert Lee Stephens Jr. (nephew)

Jess E. Stephens (May 4, 1882 – December 2, 1953) was an American attorney who was noted for his legal work on behalf of an important traffic tunnel project in Los Angeles and for a union railroad station there, as well as his handling of claims against the city after the collapse of the Saint Francis Dam. He later became a judge of the Los Angeles County Superior Court.

== Personal ==
Stephens was born May 4, 1882 in State Line, Indiana, the son of Edwin Elias Stephens and Arminda Jane Rice, both of Ohio. He had a brother, Albert Lee Stephens, and four sisters. The family moved to Compton, California when Jess was 2, and he attended school there. In February 1900 he was graduated from Los Angeles High School, and then he studied law with a firm of attorneys and at Stanford University.

He was married to Alice Bernice Cherry of Iowa and Illinois in the Pico Heights Congregational Church on September 1 or 18, 1907, and they had two children.

He was a member of the Elks, the Masons, the Shriners and the Whitley Park Country Club. In 1930 he was president of the City Club.

Stephens died at age 71 on December 2, 1953 in his home at 1416 N. Hayvenhurst Drive, West Hollywood. A Protestant, he was buried in Forest Lawn Memorial Park, Glendale.

== Vocation ==
Stephens was admitted to the bar in 1904 after undergoing the last oral examination ever conducted by the California Supreme Court.

For two years he was associated with his brother, Albert Lee Stephens, as a vice president of the California Title Insurance Company, then known as the Title, Abstract & Trust Company.

In 1909 he was appointed deputy city attorney by City Attorney Leslie R. Hewitt and served until 1913, when he entered private practice for two years. He returned to the city service in 1915 and was promoted to assistant city attorney in 1918 under his brother, Albert Lee, who was then the city attorney. In January 1921 the City Council appointed him as the city attorney to fill the unexpired term of Charles S. Burnell, who had been appointed a judge. He was elected to his own term in July 1921, and he served for eight years thereafter. In none of the elections did he face any opposition.

As city attorney, he was notable for:

- His work as counsel in the Second Street Tunnel litigation in the 1920s, winning a decision from the United States Supreme Court favoring the project's legality. He argued the case himself in front of the court.
- His handling of claims arising from the collapse of the Saint Francis Dam in 1928. He obtained settlements from all the claimants but one, and the city won the single suit that was filed.
- The success of a movement compelling railroads serving Los Angeles to build a Union Station in the area of the Plaza.

In 1929 he opened his own law practice with L.P. Green, specializing in municipal and corporation law One of his clients was Oscar T. Conklin, a Ventura, California, newspaper publisher, who was challenging the legality of a new city charter that had been adopted by voters in that city.

In December 1937 he was appointed by Governor Frank Merriam to the Los Angeles Superior Court, along with Clement Nye and Benjamin Scheinman. He served in the Appellate Division with Judges Hartley Shaw and Edward T. Bishop. Stephens retired from the court in October 1953, at the age of 69, saying that ill health prevented him from serving longer.

== References and notes ==
| Preceded by Charles S. Burnell | Los Angeles City Attorney; Jess E. Stephens; 1921–29 | Succeeded by Erwin P. Warner |
