= Leslie Randall =

Leslie Randall may refer to:

- Leslie Randall (bishop)
- Leslie Randall (actor)

== See also ==
- Leslie Randall Hewitt, American journalist, lawyer, judge and politician
