= Burt Pines =

California politician and judge

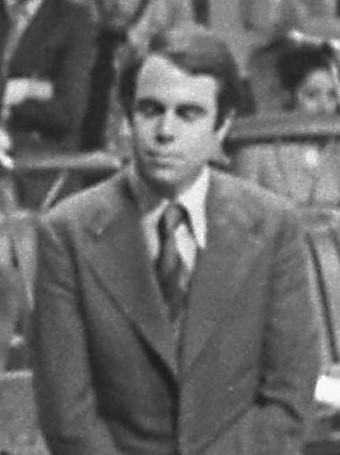
- Pines in 1973

Judge of the Los Angeles County Superior Court
- Incumbent
- Assumed office 2003
- Appointed by: Gray Davis
- Preceded by: Laurie D. Zelon

37th Los Angeles City Attorney
- In office July 1, 1973 – June 30, 1981
- Preceded by: Roger Arnebergh
- Succeeded by: Ira Reiner

Personal details
- Born: May 16, 1939 (age 87)
- Education: University of Southern California (B.A.); New York University (J.D.)

Burt Pines (born May 16, 1939) is a California attorney and politician. He served as Los Angeles City Attorney from 1973 to 1981 and has served as a judge of the Los Angeles County Superior Court since 2003.

== Early life and education ==
Pines was born (on 16 May 1939) Burt Landeau, the only child of Charles Landeau and Ruth Pines. His parents divorced when Pines was a year old, and his mother changed his name to Pines shortly thereafter. Pines received his B.A. degree from the University of Southern California and his J.D. degree from the New York University Law School.

== Political career ==
Pines was elected Los Angeles City Attorney in 1973 and served two terms in office. He declined to run for a third term in 1981, instead endorsing Los Angeles City Councilman Bob Ronka.

In 1978, Pines was considered the early front-runner in the Democratic primary for California Attorney General, but lost the primary race to Congresswoman Yvonne Braithwaite Burke.

In December 1998, incoming California Governor Gray Davis selected Pines to serve as his judicial appointments secretary.

== Judicial service ==
In June 2003, when it appeared almost certain that a recall election against Governor Gray Davis would be certified and while still serving as judicial appointments secretary, Pines himself applied for a judgeship. The recall election was certified on July 23, and during the October special election voters recalled Davis and elected Arnold Schwarzenegger as the new governor. On November 11, 2003, as one of the many appointments during his final days in office, Davis appointed Pines to the Los Angeles County Superior Court. Pines filled the vacancy created when Judge Laurie Zelon was elevated to the California Court of Appeal in Los Angeles County. He retired from the bench in 2011.

== References and notes ==
Preceded by Roger Arnebergh	Los Angeles City Attorney; Burt Pines; 1973–81	Succeeded by Ira Reiner
