= J. C. Daly =

California businessman and public official (1846–1932)

J. C. Daly (1846–1932) was a lawyer, a California politician and a farmer in Ventura County, California. He was an authority on water rights and agricultural laws.

== Personal ==
Daly was born in Rochester, New York, on May 13, 1846, and was educated at Niagara College, New York. He was married to Mary Ann Burke in Utica, New York; she died about 1932. They had three children, Joseph B. of San Fernando, California, William F. of Ventura, California, and Kate (Mrs. T.J. Donovan).

The family came to California in 1883 and settled in Los Angeles in 1887, then moved to Ventura County in 1889.

Daly died at age 86 at the home of his son, William, in the Mound district of Ventura, on December 8, 1932. Funeral services were at Mission San Buenaventura, with burial in Ventura Cemetery.

== Vocation ==
=== Legal ===
In Los Angeles, Daly was elected city attorney in 1886 and reelected in 1887. In 1896 he served as justice of the peace in Ventura County. In 1898 he was California port commissioner in San Francisco, and in 1902 he was assistant California attorney general. In politics, he was at one time a Republican and later a Democrat.

He was for many years an associate counsel for the Southern Pacific Railroad. Daly was also an authority on water rights and farming laws.

=== Land development and farming ===
In 1905 Daly purchased on behalf of the Adams-Phillips Company a half interest in the former 2,500-acre Dixie Thompson rancho east of Ventura, which had the largest plantation of lima beans in the world, with a seafront of nearly five miles. The west end of the rancho was to be divided into tracts for resale.

As president of the Fruit Growers Association, in February 1908 he addressed a letter to U.S. Secretary of Agriculture James Wilson supporting the use of sulphurization in preserving fruit. He wrote:

Governments exercising paternal supervision, such as Germany, have attempted to limit the amount of sulphur dioxide in our dried fruits, which legislation, we have contended, was to prevent the light, beautiful and appetizing California dried fruits coming in competition with the dark-colored and poor-tasting fruit produced and sold in that country.

In 1916 Daly was noted to be a "prominent" bean grower.

== References and notes ==
Preceded by James Wilfred McKinley	Los Angeles City Attorney; J.C. Daly; 1886–88	Succeeded by Charles H. McFarland
