= John F. Godfrey =

American lawyer

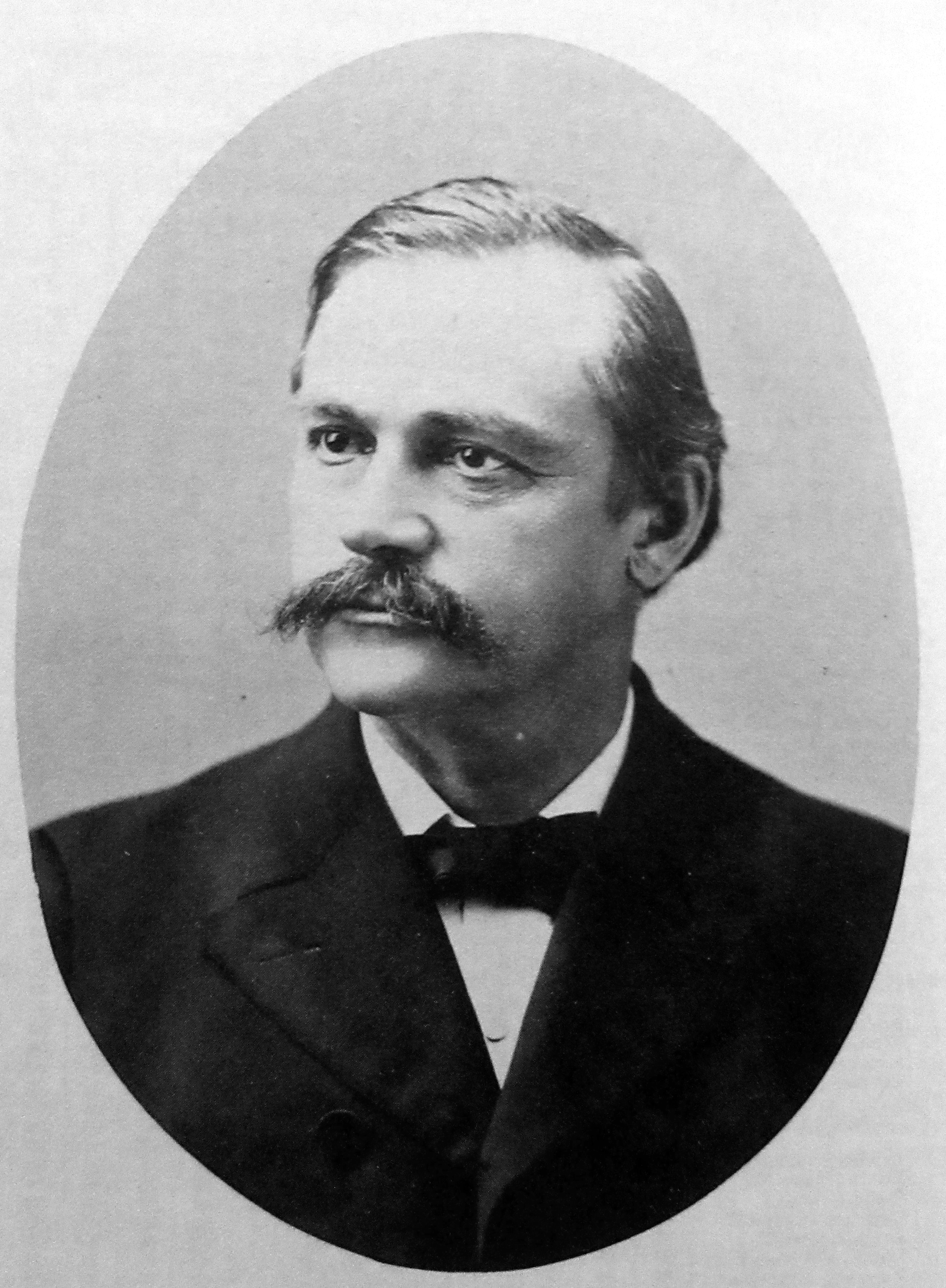
- Godfrey c. 1880s

20th Los Angeles City Attorney
- In office December 1876 – December 1880
- Preceded by: Aurelius W. Hutton
- Succeeded by: Henry T. Hazard

Personal details
- Born: June 23, 1839 Bangor, Maine, U.S.
- Died: June 29, 1885 (aged 46) Los Angeles, California, U.S.
- Party: Democratic
- Other political affiliations: People's (1876); Workingmen's (1878); Greenback (1880–1882)
- Spouse(s): Abbie Bartlett (m. 1869; died 1875) Helen Percival (m. 1877)
- Children: 5

Military service
- Allegiance: United States
- Branch/service: United States Army
- Years of service: 1861–1864
- Rank: Lieutenant Colonel
- Unit: 1st Maine Cavalry Regiment; 1st Maine Light Artillery Battery; 2nd Maine Cavalry Regiment
- Battles/wars: Civil War; Siege of Port Hudson

John Franklin Godfrey (June 23, 1839 – June 29, 1885) was a sailor, a soldier and officer in the U.S. Civil War, a city attorney of Los Angeles, California, and an attorney in private practice who, among other activities, represented people arrested for operating businesses on Sundays.

== Personal ==
John Franklin Godfrey was born on June 23, 1839 in Bangor, Maine, the son of John Edwards Godfrey, a Central Maine lawyer. Young Godfrey attended Bangor High School.

He settled in Los Angeles in 1874, purchased a house on Adams Street in the southwestern part of the city and began cultivating oranges. Godfrey married twice, his first wife dying in Los Angeles in 1875, and two years later he married again.

Godfrey was credited with saving the life of Henry Hunt, who faced a lynch mob in Los Angeles after he was put into jail and accused of murdering George W. Gillis, a popular deputy sheriff.

Col. Godfrey, seeing that the man could only be saved from lawless violence by a ruse, addressed the crowd and made a pretense of endorsing the proposed lynching. But he added that ... there was a way in which the crowd could give a better proof of its sympathy with the murdered man's family. who had been left in destitute circumstances. This was to make a contribution of money to the widow. ... But many in the crowd, though anxious to take a hand in the hanging, did not feel sympathetic enough to give anything, and began to disperse the minute the hat started on its rounds.

Godfrey died suddenly on June 29, 1885, leaving a wife and four or five children. A memorial service attracted nearly every lawyer in the city, and burial took place in the family plot.

== Vocation ==
=== Sailing and sheepherding ===
Instead of attending college, Godfrey became a merchant sailor at about age 15 at first against the wishes of his parents, "but with their final consent that he might try the life for a year." He shipped on the Young Eagle to New Brunswick and Liverpool, England, thence on the Northland to New Orleans and Texas. In another ship he sailed as far as Buenos Ayres in South America. Having pursued sailing for two years he left ship there and became a sheepherder. Eventually, "in partnership with several other Americans—his brother among the number," he secured the leasehold of a large estate and "the proprietorship of a band of sheep."

=== Military ===
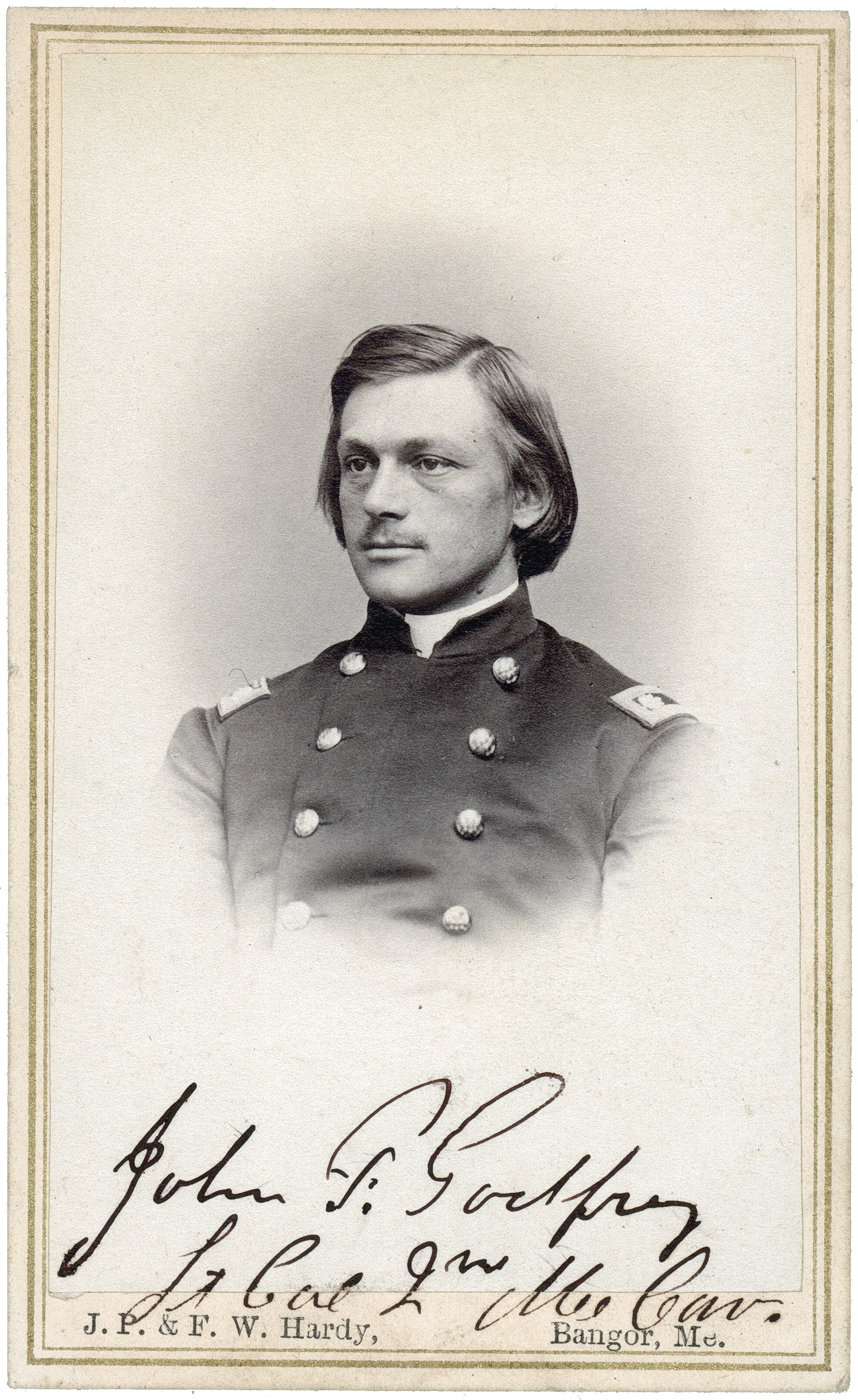
Carte de visite of Lieutenant Colonel Godfrey by J. P. & F. W. Hardy c. 1864

At the outbreak of the American Civil War in 1861, Godfrey returned to the United States and at age 21 he enlisted as a private in the First Maine Cavalry, but in two weeks he had secured an appointment as a first lieutenant in the First Maine Battery, Light Artillery. In August 1862, Godfrey received an order from General Butler in New Orleans detaching him from the battery and giving him permission to raise a company of cavalry in the city. He applied for a captaincy of one of them, and received the order to raise the company (Company C, 1st Louisiana Cavalry, US). As Captain of Company C, Godfrey, had participated in a large number of expeditions, skirmishes and battles against the Confederates in Louisiana, including the Siege of Port Hudson (May 23 - July 9, 1863), and the Battle of Clinton (June 3, 1863). By 1864 he had been promoted to lieutenant colonel with the Second Maine Cavalry. He resigned from the Army in summer of that year because of ill health.

After the war, Godfrey enlisted as a scout for a government expedition into Sioux country, under the command of James A. Sawyers. It was written that Godfrey, pursued by Indians and in search of help for besieged companions, once "walked 150 miles in three days and three nights, never halting for a moment's rest or sleep" and subsisting "on a chunk of raw bacon."

=== Civilian ===
In 1866 Godfrey left Montana, worked in laboring jobs in Austin, Nevada; Marysville, California, and San Francisco, then went back to Maine to read law in his father's office in Bangor and become a lawyer. He was admitted to practice in California in 1874.

One of his clients was the Total Wreck Mining Company, which was seeking a patent. He traveled to Washington, D.C., in a successful urging of this claim, and returned with J.M. Requa of New York, the company president.

Godfrey was active in the California Democratic Party as early as August 1876. That December, he was elected Los Angeles city attorney on the Democratic and People's tickets, and in 1878 he was reelected on the Workingman's ticket. Also in 1878, he was an unsuccessful Democratic candidate for California's Second Constitutional Convention. In 1880 he received the Greenback-Labor nomination for Congress in California's 4th district, but lost the election. In 1882 he was selected as a delegate to the state convention of the Greenbackers in San Francisco.

Godfrey and Stephen M. White represented a group of defendants who in 1882 were prosecuted for having violated the Sunday closing laws that had been in effect in Los Angeles for the preceding nineteen years. Answering a prosecution against saloonkeeper Jacob Phillipi, who had "knowingly and willfully" kept his business open on Sunday, Godfrey argued that the law was being enforced only against "one class" of business, that of saloons, and he compared the prosecution to that of the burning of witches in Salem, Massachusetts. The jury was unable to return a verdict, seven for conviction and five for acquittal, and it was dismissed.

Preceded by Aurelius W. Hutton	Los Angeles City Attorney; John F. Godfrey; 1876–80	Succeeded by Henry T. Hazard
