= Leslie R. Hewitt =

Journalist, lawyer, judge and politician

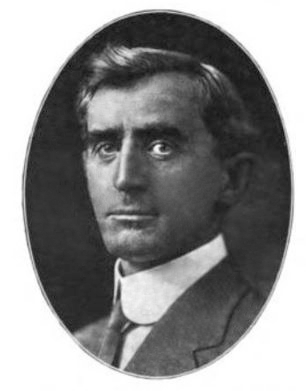
- Hewitt at an unknown date

Member of the California Senate from the 38th district
- In office January 2, 1911 – January 4, 1915
- Preceded by: H. S. G. McCartney
- Succeeded by: John W. Ballard

Los Angeles City Attorney
- In office 1906–1910
- Preceded by: W.B. Mathews
- Succeeded by: John W. Shenk

Personal details
- Born: September 12, 1867 Olympia, Washington, U.S.
- Died: December 17, 1936 (aged 69) Pasadena, California, U.S.
- Party: Republican
- Spouse: Mable Young
- Children: 3
- Education: University of California

Leslie Randall Hewitt (September 12, 1867 – December 17, 1936) was an American journalist, lawyer, judge and politician. He wrote for the Los Angeles Express before reading law. From 1906 to 1910, Hewitt was Los Angeles City Attorney. He later served one term in the California State Senate, and between 1913 and 1924, served as a judge in the California superior court system.

== Personal ==
Hewitt was born on September 12, 1867, in Olympia, Washington, the son of Randall H. Hewitt, a journalist from Seneca Falls, New York, and Ellen L. Hewitt. Leslie was brought to Los Angeles by his parents at age about 9; he was an unsuccessful candidate for appointment to the United States Naval Academy at Annapolis, Maryland, when he was 14 years old. He graduated from Los Angeles High School in 1885, and he was president of the school's alumni association in 1890.

That same year, Hewitt was awarded a bachelor of letters degree by the University of California

Hewitt was married to Mable Eastwood of New Castle, California, on April 30, 1901, in San Francisco. They had three children, Beatrice, Asa R. and Emily Ellen. He was a member of the Los Angeles County Bar Association and the California State Bar Association. He was a thirty-second degree Mason, belonging to Pentalpha Lodge, No. 202, Free and Accepted Masons; Los Angeles Consistory of the Scottish Rite; and Al Malaikah Temple of the Mystic Shrine. He also is affiliated with Los Angeles Lodge, No. 2, Knights of Pythias; the University club, and the Army and Navy Club.

Hewitt died December 17, 1936, in his home on South Oakland Avenue in Pasadena, California. Burial was in Forest Lawn Memorial Park, Glendale.

== Career ==
Hewitt worked for the Los Angeles Express when he was young, but after graduating from the university he studied law in the offices of Wills, Monroe and Lee and then with Houghton, Silent and Campbell. He was admitted to the bar in San Francisco in August 1893; in 1895, he set up his own practice.

He was appointed deputy to Los Angeles City Attorney Walter F. Haas and then to Haas's successor, W.B. Mathews. In 1906, he was elected city attorney himself. One of the cases on which Hewitt worked was a petition for a writ of mandate against City Clerk Harry J. Lelande who had refused to publish an ordinance calling for an election on bond issues to provide for a Los Angeles Harbor and to improve the power system. While working on that case, he suffered a "nervous attack," a "swoon," and city health officer L.M. Powers had to be summoned. Hewitt insisted on finishing the complaint but then took time off to recover. Hewitt resigned the city attorney position in 1911 to become a special counsel for the first Los Angeles City Board of Harbor Commissioners.

A Republican, Hewitt was elected to the California State Senate in November 1910; he served four years. Between 1913 and 1924, he was a Superior Court judge, and then he gave up the bench to resume private practice, partnering with Guy R. Crump in the Title Insurance Building.

Preceded by W.B. Mathews	Los Angeles City Attorney; Leslie R. Hewitt; 1906–10	Succeeded by John W. Shenk
