= Thomas P. White =

American judge (1888–1968)

Thomas Patrick White
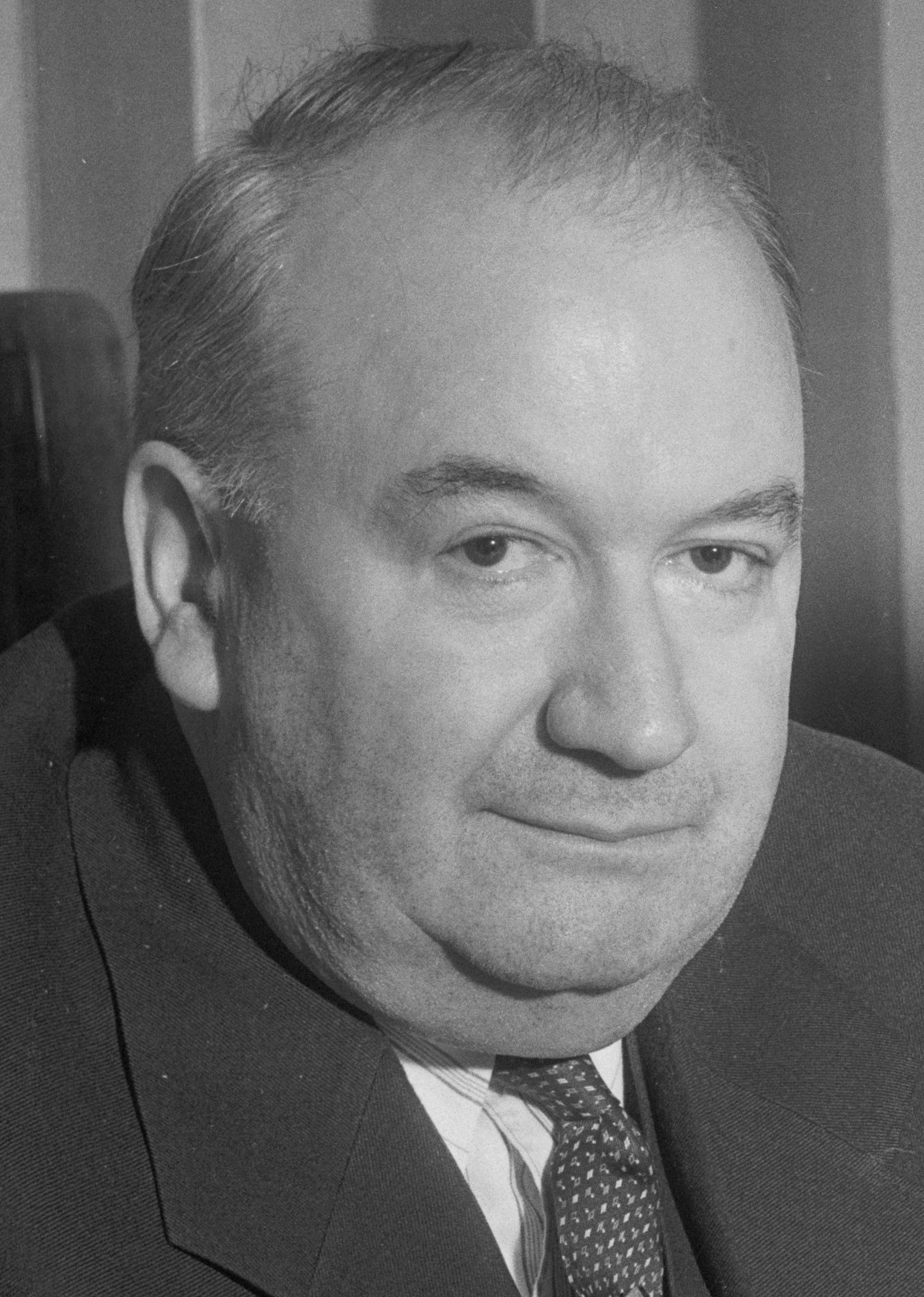
- White in 1936

Associate Justice of the California Supreme Court
- In office August 18, 1959 – October 31, 1962
- Appointed by: Governor Pat Brown
- Preceded by: John W. Shenk
- Succeeded by: Paul Peek

Presiding Justice of the California Court of Appeal, Second Appellate District, Division One
- In office 1949–1959
- Appointed by: Governor Earl Warren
- Preceded by: John M. York
- Succeeded by: Parker Wood

Personal details
- Born: September 28, 1888 Los Angeles, California, U.S.
- Died: February 7, 1968 (aged 79) Los Altos, California, U.S.
- Spouse: Helen H. White (m. 1915; died 1937) Aline Kathleen De Courcy (m. 1956; died 1959)
- Education: University of Southern California (LLB)

Thomas Patrick White (September 28, 1888 – February 7, 1968) was an associate justice of the Supreme Court of California from August 18, 1959, to October 31, 1962.

== Biography ==
White was born in the Lincoln Heights district of Los Angeles, California, and educated in the public schools. He graduated from St. Vincent's high school, and studied for a year at St. Vincent's college. He then worked for the Santa Fe Railroad. In 1911, he graduated from the University of Southern California with a LL.B. degree.

Following graduation, White entered private practice in the firm of Randall, Bartlett & White from 1911 to 1913. In 1913, he was appointed judge of the Los Angeles Police Court, taking the seat of H. H. Rose. In August 1914, he helped create a women's division in the court, which included women serving as judges. In 1918, he ran unsuccessfully for Superior Court judge. In 1920, he resigned from the Police Court to enter private practice in Los Angeles with the firm of Irwin, White & Rosecrans, where he employed a young attorney, Louis H. Burke, who went onto the California Supreme Court.

On August 21, 1931, Governor James Rolph appointed White as a judge of the Los Angeles County Superior Court. In 1932, White ran for re-election and won.

On December 5, 1937, Governor Frank Merriam elevated White to the California Court of Appeal, Second Appellate District, Division One. In 1949, Governor Earl Warren appointed him Presiding Justice of that court.

In August 1959, Governor Pat Brown named him an associate justice of the California Supreme Court. After retiring from the bench in October 1962, White continued to occasionally hear cases by designation.

He died on February 7, 1968, in Los Angeles.

== Honors and awards ==
In 1926, he was awarded an honorary Doctor of Laws degree from Loyola Law School and later received the St. Thomas More Medallion. In 1961, he received the Asa V. Call Award from the University of Southern California as outstanding alumnus.

== Personal life ==
White married twice. He married Helen H. White in February 1915. After her death in 1937, at age 67 he remarried to Aline Kathleen De Courcy in Los Angeles on July 18, 1956. She died on November 19, 1959.

== See also ==
- List of justices of the Supreme Court of California

Legal offices
| Preceded by John W. Shenk | Associate Justice of the California Supreme Court; 1959–1962 | Succeeded by Paul Peek |
| Preceded by John M. York | Presiding Justice of the California Court of Appeal, Second Appellate District, Division One; 1949–1959 | Succeeded by Parker Wood |
