= Frank H. Howard =

American lawyer

- Born: c. 1840; Mississippi, U.S.
- Disappeared: August 6, 1896; Los Angeles, California, U.S.
- Status: Missing for 129 years, 6 months and 6 days
- Occupation: Attorney

Frank H. Howard (before 1840 – disappeared August 6, 1896) was an American attorney who was president of the Los Angeles County Board of Education and a member of the Los Angeles City Library Board and a trustee of the county law library. He represented the city librarian when she sued a Methodist minister for slander over a prayer he had recited. Howard disappeared without a trace in 1896.

== Personal ==
Howard was born in Mississippi, the son of Volney E. Howard, the first appointed attorney general of the state of Texas. Frank Howard graduated from Heidelberg University with a medical degree and then took up law to become an attorney. He was said to be a linguist "of no ordinary mark," having studied French, German, Spanish and classical languages.

He settled in Los Angeles, before 1865.

== Vocation ==
In 1886, Howard was president of the Los Angeles County Board of Education, and in 1890 he was a Democratic candidate for Superior Court judge in Los Angeles.

In 1891, members of a library board newly appointed under provisions of a new Los Angeles city charter brought a suit against Howard and the other members of the existing board, which the newcomers wanted to supplant. Superior Court Judge Shaw ruled in favor of the defendants and so they were able to resume their positions as the "legal and duly-authorized officers" of the library. The decision was sustained by the California Supreme Court in March 1892.

Howard was also a trustee of the County Law Library, resigning from that post on July 21, 1892. He was president of the Los Angeles Bar Association in November 1893.

Howard was one of the attorneys representing city librarian Tessa L. Kelso, who had sued a Methodist minister, J. W. Campbell, for slander after he had called her out in a prayer from his pulpit on August 19, 1894, for having purchased a number of assertedly obscene French-language books, including Le Cadet by Jean Richepin. Campbell's prayer was: "Oh! Lord, vouchsafe thy saving grace to the librarian of the Los Angeles city library, and cleanse her of all sin and make her a woman worthy of her office."

Howard argued that "the law of slander was such that any statement of action tending to diminish the authority of anyone occupying an official position was actionable and that the acts complained of certainly tended to diminish the confidence of the public in his client as a public officer." In April 1895 a Superior Court judge ruled that the actions of the minister were not privileged, that "slander can be perpetuated in the form of a prayer" and that the action could proceed.

At about the same time, Howard was the chairman of a two-man committee that examined the policy of the library regarding the purchase of books and whether "our rules need amendment in any respect, either as to the censorship of books to be placed upon the shelves, or in the manner of distributing the same for use on the premises, or for home circulation."

== Disappearance ==
On August 6, 1896, Howard left his house at 1043 South Hill Street, "telling his family that he was going on a business trip to San Bernardino and the desert. That day he was seen by a friend, standing on a street corner waiting for a streetcar." That was the last trace of him. A body was found on Mount Wilson the next month, raising an expectation that it was Howard's, but that identification was ruled out by Los Angeles County Coroner George W. Campbell.

Three years later, in October 1899, some members of the Bar Association met to reorganize the association after a lapse in meetings for the previous five years. A reorganization committee composed of Lucien Shaw, John D. Works and John S. Chapman noted that "Mr. Howard is not now a resident of the State."

== See also ==
- List of people who disappeared mysteriously (pre-1910)

Preceded by William McPherson	Los Angeles City Attorney; Frank H. Howard; 1870–72	Succeeded by Aurelius W. Hutton
