= Roger Arnebergh =

American politician

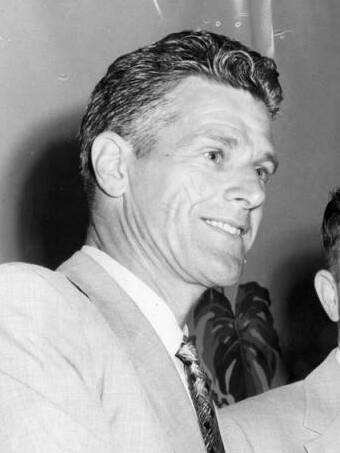
- Arnebergh in 1956

36th Los Angeles City Attorney
- In office July 1, 1953 – June 27, 1973
- Preceded by: Ray L. Chesebro
- Succeeded by: Burt Pines

Personal details
- Born: August 17, 1909 Saint Paul, Minnesota, U.S.
- Died: January 25, 2004 (aged 94) Canoga Park, Los Angeles, California, U.S.

Roger Arnebergh (August 17, 1909 – January 25, 2004) was an American attorney and elected official. He served as Los Angeles City Attorney from 1953 to 1973.

== Biography ==
=== Early life ===
Roger Arneberg was born in Saint Paul, Minnesota. He was the son of Targe Arnebergh and Amelia Graagaard, who were of Norwegian and Danish ancestry. Although he dropped out of high school at the age of fifteen, he received a law degree through extension learning.

=== Career ===
Arnebergh won the election for Los Angeles City Attorney in 1953 with support from Ray L. Chesebro, who was retiring. He would be re-elected five times with little opposition. Throughout his 20 years as city attorney, Arneburgh usually ran unopposed. Arnebergh led a department that increased from 76 to 185 lawyers during his tenure and was widely praised for his fair handling of disputes among city departments and his enforcement of misdemeanors.

However, in 1973, Burt Pines and Ira Reiner both ran for the office against Arneburgh. He was forced into a runoff against Pines, who won with 58%.

After his loss, Arnebergh practiced law privately in Van Nuys. He was briefly in the limelight in 1991, as part of Citizens for Integrity and Viability in the City Charter, which supported former Police Chief Daryl Gates, and was against changes in the selection, removal and tenure of future police chiefs.

=== Death ===
Arnebergh died on January 25, 2004.

== Personal life ==
Arnebergh married Emilie Katherine Rogers (1908–2009), on May 1, 1937. They had one child.

Preceded by Ray L. Chesebro	Los Angeles City Attorney; Roger Arnebergh; 1953–73	Succeeded by Burt Pines
