= Samuel F. Reynolds =

American lawyer, judge (died 1877)

Los Angeles City Attorney
- In office 1859–1861
- Preceded by: James H. Lader
- Succeeded by: James H. Lader

Samuel F. Reynolds (died 1877) was a Los Angeles City Attorney and a judge in 19th century California. He was also active in the International Order of Odd Fellows.

Reynolds was admitted as a lawyer before the U.S. District Court in Los Angeles in September 1850 and before the California Supreme Court in February 1856.

He was elected to the board of directors of the Los Angeles Library Association in July 1859, and in 1861 he became Los Angeles city attorney, a position he held for two years.

In 1863 Reynolds was judge of the 4th District Court at a salary of $5,000 a year for a period of six years and then resume private practice. In 1870-71 he was a member of a committee of the Odd Fellows lodge that was tasked with the duty of researching and recommending whether an Odd Fellows College and Home should be established.

Reynolds died on February 12, 1877, at the age of 68 after an attack of apoplexy. He was buried in the Masonic Cemetery in San Francisco. Pallbearers included John Currey, past chief justice of California.

His widow, Rachel Ann, died on October 10, 1901, at the age of 81. She was the mother of Charles F. and Mary E. Reynolds and Leonard and Benjamin A. Reynolds.

Preceded by James H. Lader	Los Angeles City Attorney; 1859–61	Succeeded by James H. Lader
