= John Dustin Bicknell =

American lawyer

John D. Bicknell (June 25, 1838 – July 7, 1911) was an American real estate attorney and investor. He studied law in Wisconsin, later being admitted to the bar in the supreme court of that state. From 1872 to 1907 he participated in the Los Angeles real estate boom, and founded the law firm that is now known as Gibson, Dunn & Crutcher. He was also associated with the founding of Monrovia and Azusa, California, and oil developments in the Santa Maria Valley.

== Early life and career ==
Bicknell was born in Jericho, Vermont, elder son of Nathaniel and Fanny (Thompson) Bicknell, and a direct descendant of Hannah Dustin.

Bicknell moved to Wisconsin where he attended college. In 1860 Bicknell went to Missouri, where he taught school for two years. Troubled by his asthma he decided to move to California. In 1862 he joined a group of emigrants and was elected captain of the expedition directing them to Knights Landing, California. Bicknell stayed in California until 1863, then resolved to return to Wisconsin to study law. Bicknell was admitted to the bar of the Supreme Court of Wisconsin in 1865; and engaged in practice in Greenfield, Missouri.

Bicknell's first marriage was to Maria Hatch, in Vermont, in 1868. However, the bride died two months later, dying in Wisconsin where they resided. Bicknell's second marriage, to the widow Nancy (Christian) Dobbins occurred in 1871.

== Los Angeles legal practice ==
In 1872 Bicknell moved to Los Angeles. He participated in the real estate boom both as an attorney and through his own investments. In 1887 the Southern Pacific Transportation Company chose Bicknell as its counsel because of his real estate reputation. Bicknell later became a lawyer for Huntington and the Los Angeles Railway. Bicknell was the attorney for General William Rosencrans' action to establish title to a large tract south of Los Angeles. In 1890 Bicknell was president of the Los Angeles County Bar Association.

From 1872 to 1875 he practiced in Los Angeles as Bicknell and Rothchild; from 1875 to 1886 he maintained an office alone; from 1886 to 1890 as Bicknell & White. From 1890 as Bicknell & Trask - this was later changed to Bicknell, Trask & Gibson, while a succeeding change added the names of Crutcher and Dunn. Bicknell retired in 1907.

== Real estate investor ==
Bicknell was associated with the founding of Monrovia, California; Azusa, California, and the development of oil in the Santa Maria Valley. Bicknell Park in Montebello, California, Bicknell Avenue in Santa Monica, California, and the ghost town of Bicknell on the Orcutt Oil Field, south of Santa Maria, are named for him.
