= Erwin P. Werner =

American lawyer and politician (1893–1975)

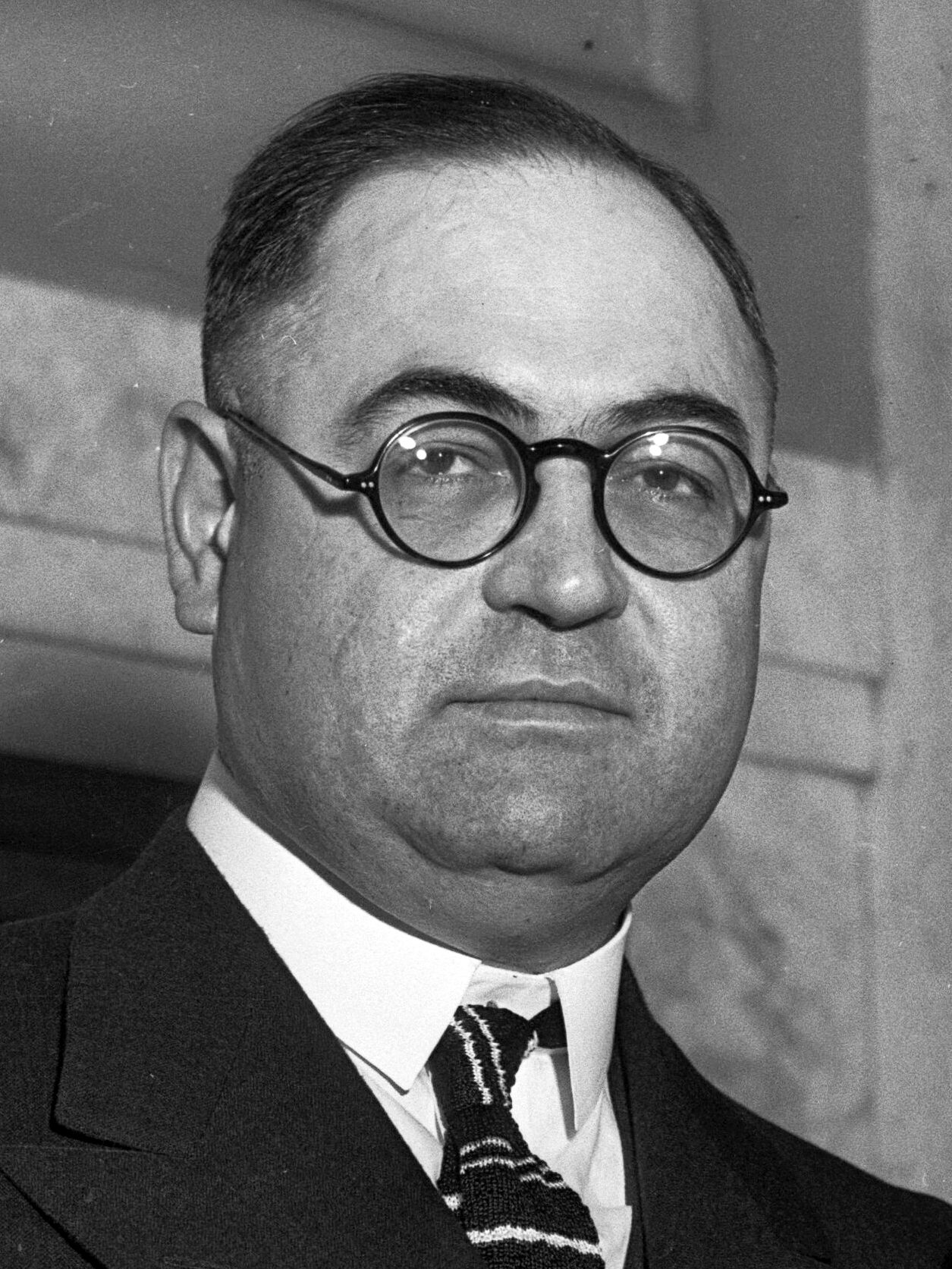
- Warner in 1936

34th Los Angeles City Attorney
- In office July 1, 1929 – June 30, 1933
- Preceded by: Jess E. Stephens
- Succeeded by: Ray L. Chesebro

Personal details
- Born: January 12, 1893 Eau Claire, Wisconsin, U.S.
- Died: April 27, 1975 (aged 82) Redondo Beach, California, U.S.
- Party: Republican
- Spouse: Ethel Helen Mccollum (m. 1920; div. 1944) Adeline Anna Baruch (m. 1951; died 1956) Marjorie Augusta West Coburn (m. 1958–1975)

Erwin Peter Werner (January 12, 1893 – April 27, 1975) was an American lawyer who served as the 34th Los Angeles City Attorney from 1929 to 1933. Elected in 1928 after defeating city councilman Peirson Mitchell Hall, Werner became embroiled in bribery allegations alongside his then-wife, Helen. The couple were considered influential figures in the city. After the allegations emerged and investigations began, Werner lost the primary election to Ray L. Chesebro. Following his departure from office, Werner faced further investigations, and he and Helen were convicted of soliciting a bribe and grand theft in 1938. Werner was the only Los Angeles City Attorney to lose re-election in a primary until Hydee Feldstein Soto did so in 2026.

== Early life ==
Erwin Peter Werner was born on January 12, 1893, in Eau Claire, Wisconsin. His family moved to Los Angeles in 1901, and he delivered newspapers to help support them with income.

== Political career ==
=== City Attorney ===
In 1929, Raymond J. Werner announced his candidacy for the office of Los Angeles City Attorney. He led the ticket in the primary election in May, along with councilman Peirson Mitchell Hall. In the runoff, Werner defeated Hall in a landslide, with a vote of 152,566 to 82,444, becoming the 34th City Attorney. His campaign was managed by his wife, Helen, who held parties to have the city's elite support him, even serving liquor during Prohibition.

Early during his term, rumors of criminal conduct began to surface about him and his wife, with Helen having helped Los Angeles County District Attorney Buron Fitts during his 1930 gubernatoral campaign which helped gain support for Werner's re-election. In August 1931, a month after the city flag of Los Angeles was adopted, Werner wrote to the city's Municipal Art Commission, which had argued that the flag was a work of art requiring their attention and approval under the city charter, declaring that "the official flag of the City of Los Angeles does not come within the definition of works of art".

In 1932, a bullet shattered the Werners’ car windshield; an investigation into who shot the gun was not successful. That same year, Helen was appointed to the Pasadena courts by Werner's former employer, a move protested by the Los Angeles Bar Association. Werner ran for re-election in 1933 against challenger Ray L. Chesebro but was defeated by him in the primary election in an upset. During the election, there was a purported plot to damage Werner's political career by bringing an indictment against him on a felony charge before the election. Werner's loss was the first since the adoption of the primary ballot process in 1917, and Werner remained the last city attorney to lose a primary election until 2026, when Hydee Feldstein Soto lost her primary race.

=== Investigations and bribery allegations ===
Werner with his wife, Helen, after she was charged with solicitation of a bribe, 1937.

After Werner lost, a grand jury investigation led by District Attorney Buron Fitts continued. The investigation was unsuccessful, and Werner began preparing to run for the California State Senate in 1934. However, after Helen was indicted by federal officials, he withdrew from the race. In 1936, Werner and Helen were subpoenaed in an investigation into corruption at the California State Board of Equalization and charged with soliciting bribes, but they were found not guilty. Seven months later, they were charged with soliciting a bribe and grand theft. In April 1938, they were convicted of soliciting a bribe and grand theft and sentenced to two to 10 years in prison.

Werner was released after appealing, and the State Bar also investigated him for ambulance chasing. His law license was revoked for six months, then reinstated by the California Supreme Court in 1939; the court overturned his convictions the following year. He was disbarred again in 1944 for moral turpitude and dishonesty. Over the next decade, Werner worked as a delivery truck driver for the American Red Cross, a railroad clerk and brakeman, and a law clerk.

== Personal life ==
In 1920, he and Ethel Helen McCollum from Tennessee married. While Helen was serving her sentence in 1938, Werner filed for divorce, accusing her of mental and physical cruelty. They separated 15 times over the next six years before divorcing, though continued to live together until her death in 1947. After Helen's death, Werner married Adeline Anna Baruch on June 7, 1951, in Reno, Nevada. He remarried a third time to Marjorie Augusta Coburn in 1958. He had a stepson and two stepdaughters. Werner died on April 27, 1975, in Redondo Beach, California, where he had resided with Marjorie.
