= Ray L. Chesebro =

American politician

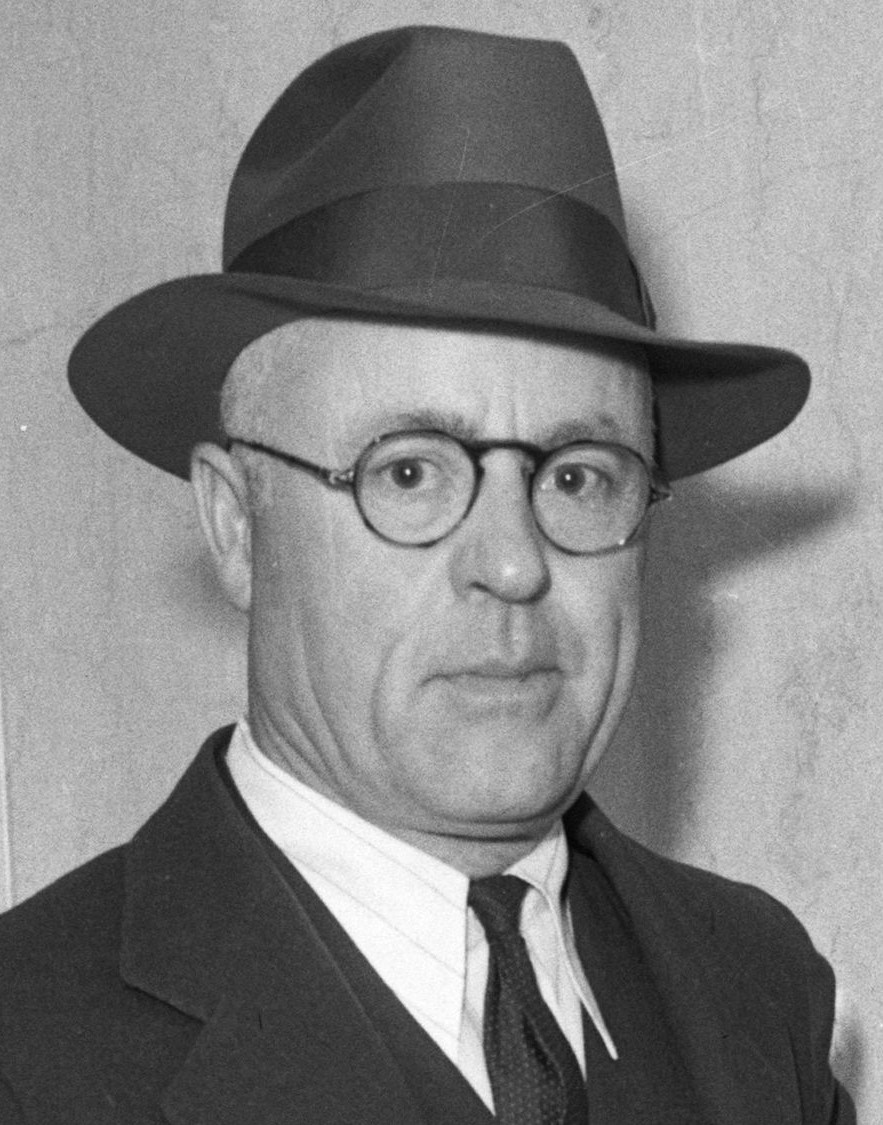
- Chesebro in the 1930s

35th Los Angeles City Attorney
- In office July 1, 1933 – June 30, 1953
- Preceded by: Erwin P. Werner
- Succeeded by: Roger Arnebergh

Personal details
- Born: August 28, 1880 Mazeppa, Minnesota
- Died: March 25, 1954 (aged 73) Los Angeles, California

Raymond L. Chesebro (August 28, 1880 – March 25, 1954) was an American police judge and city attorney in Los Angeles, California, who became known and commended throughout the nation.

== Personal ==
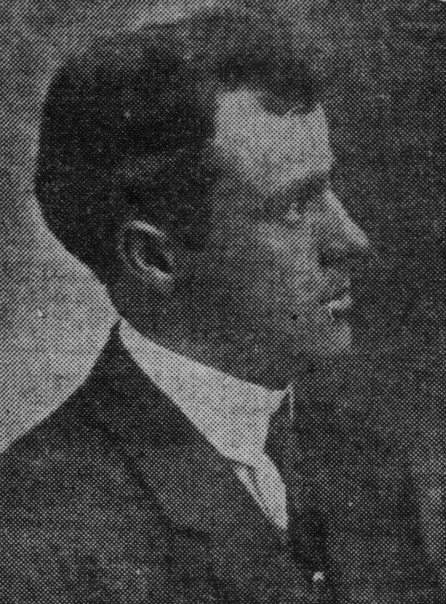
Chesebro c. 1908

Chesebro was born in Mazeppa, Minnesota on August 28, 1880. His parents were Sarah J. Hill and George Chesebro. He had a younger sister Lillian. When Ray was about nine years old his mother died. Soon after, his father died or abandoned his children. Ray and Lillian lived with relatives in Oronoco, Minnesota. As a young man, Ray lived and worked on a farm run by his grandfather, Levi P. Hill, until he was seventeen.

Chesebro came to California in 1904. He was married on April 9, 1909, to Ada B. Tripp in her home at 755 Maple Avenue.

He was a member of the Jonathan Club, Wilshire Country Club, Blue Lodge and Scottish Rite Masonic Order and Al Malaikah Temple of the Shrine.

Chesebro died at the age of 73 on March 25, 1954, in Good Samaritan Hospital after suffering a heart attack in his home at 5531 Red Oak Drive in the Hollywood Hills neighborhood. He was survived by his widow, Ada R. Chesebro; a son, Marvin Chesebro, and a daughter, Geraldine Warwick-Owensmith. A funeral service was conducted in the Hollywood Beverly Christian Church, 1717 North Gramercy Place, with interment in Inglewood Park Cemetery.

== Vocation ==
Following his grandfather's death in 1897, Ray went to Pine Island, Minnesota, to study telegraphy under James Finegan, of the Chicago and Northwestern Railway. After eighteen months, he became a night telegraph operator for the Minneapolis & St. Louis Railway. From there Chesebro went to St. Paul and worked for his cousin, W. A. Tilden in the wholesale commission business. He became an auditor with the Northern Pacific Railroad. He also studied stenography and took a job in the general freight office of the Chicago, St. Paul, Minneapolis and Omaha Railroad, advancing to private secretary to H. M. Pearce, the general freight agent. In 1904 Chesebro came to California and worked as a telegrapher for the Santa Fe Railroad and as a secretary before resettling in San Pedro, California. He was the manager of an annexation committee that successfully campaigned to annex a shoestring strip connecting Los Angeles with the harborfront cities of San Pedro and Wilmington. He next became secretary or assistant secretary in the Los Angeles County Good Roads Association and organized a campaign on behalf of paving the roadways in Los Angeles County. In July 1907 he was named secretary of a new County Highway Commission.

He read law in the offices of Bryan Hanna, a pioneer Los Angeles attorney, and was admitted to the bar in 1909. For two years Chesebro was in private practice until he was appointed a police judge in 1911; he then successfully faced the voters in 1914 and 1918. He did not stand for reelection in 1922. He was in private practice again until 1933, when he was elected city attorney over the incumbent, Erwin P. Warner, and was afterward reelected in the primaries by heavy majorities four times. In his first election, it was said that Chesebro was a beneficiary of Raymond L. Haight's organization, the Minute Men, who backed Thatcher L. Kemp in his campaign against Buron Fitts for reelection as Los Angeles city attorney.

Of his time as city attorney, the Los Angeles Times reported that Chesebro:

completely reorganized the office with an eye toward economy and cut costs nearly a quarter in the first four years. The appointive office of City Prosecutor, formerly a political plum, was abolished and its functions taken over by the City Attorney's office. For the first time, he created a criminal division in the office.

Chesebro's legal work in fields like "zoning, public works, bond issues, water supplies, Federal-municipal relations, loyalty oaths and control of tidelands resources, was known throughout the nation and widely commended." Described as "a major figure in the local policial scene," he retired in July 1953 and was succeeded by Roger Arnebergh.

== Opinions and positions ==
=== Police judge ===
- In 1917, Chesebro defended the Police Department's use of its "Metropolitan or 'Purity' Squad" to apprehend prostitutes. He said:

Today the methods employed are to take some marked money, go to a street frequented by outcast women and agree with one of them to go to a rooming-house. There the officer gives the woman the marked money and she is arrested on a charge of violating the rooming-house ordinance. That is the only method we can employ [as opposed to] a system of espionage by which an officer would watch a suspected woman until she should meet a man and go to a room with him. Then the arrest would be made, but the policeman would have to prove that the arrested people were not married. If every man and woman would stand pat, no convictions could be secured.

=== City attorney ===
- On direction of the City Council, Chesebro filed suit in 1940 against the owners of Gilmore Island, an unincorporated area in West Los Angeles, where sporting events, he said, resulted in "vehement complaints of some 30,000" city residents living next to the area. He said the activities "create unbearable noises, rowdyism and glaring lights way into the night, depriving the persons living there of normal, quiet and happy homes."
- He warned a convention of the National Institute of Municipal Law Officers in 1941 against the "specter of government ownership of tide and submerged lands," which, he said, included more than $2 billion worth of oil deposits off the coast of Southern California. He warned against "oil-grab" bills that "either died a natural death or are in a state of coma to be brought to life at some future date when resistance is not so severe." In 1946-47 he was a trustee of the organization.
- In 1944, Chesebro ordered the closing of a building at 253 South Broadway which had been used as sleeping quarters for U.S. servicemen, warning that "there is unquestioned violation of State fire laws" and alluding to a 1942 Boston night club fire in which more than 400 persons died and city officials there were convicted of lax law enforcement.
- Any public worker could be barred from holding membership in a labor union if such an affiliation is ruled "against public interests," Chesebro opined in the wake of a 1947 appellate court decision that upheld the dissolution of a police officers union. If the board in charge of the department finds "that union membership of its employees is against public interest[,] the board simply tells the workers either to get out of the union of off the public pay roll."
- There would be no way to confine gangster Mickey Cohen unless he has committed a crime, Chesebro told the City Council in a 1952 written opinion after City Councilman Kenneth Hahn suggested that Cohen be taken into protective custody "where he will not be a constant hazard to the safety of innocent persons." Chesebro said: "We cannot proceed against him on the basis of his being a public nuisance when nuisance consists primarily of people who assault his home or himself, each of which instance is beyond his control. ... "

== Legacy ==
After his retirement, he was honored by the National Institute of Municipal Law Officers for "setting an example of the way a City Attorney's office should be run" with a citation that read: "In a city where tremendous increases of population created problems of vast magnitude, his solutions to new legal questions will stand forever as a monument."

== Burglary ==
During the cemetery rites for Chesebro, two Los Angeles police officers were waiting inside Chesebro's Hollywood Hills home on a stakeout in hopes of catching a burglar who had been looting the homes of families during funeral services. They apprehended and, after a short chase, arrested an ex-convict who had broken into and entered Chesebro's home. The man, who admitted stealing $10,000 worth of property from other homes, had been watching newspapers "for his cues, especially daily when services were announced for a prominent person," the Los Angeles Times reported.

== References and notes ==
Preceded by Erwin P. Warner	Los Angeles City Attorney; Ray L. Chesebro; 1933–53	Succeeded by Roger Arnebergh
