= Henry H. Rose =

American politician

Henry Howard Rose
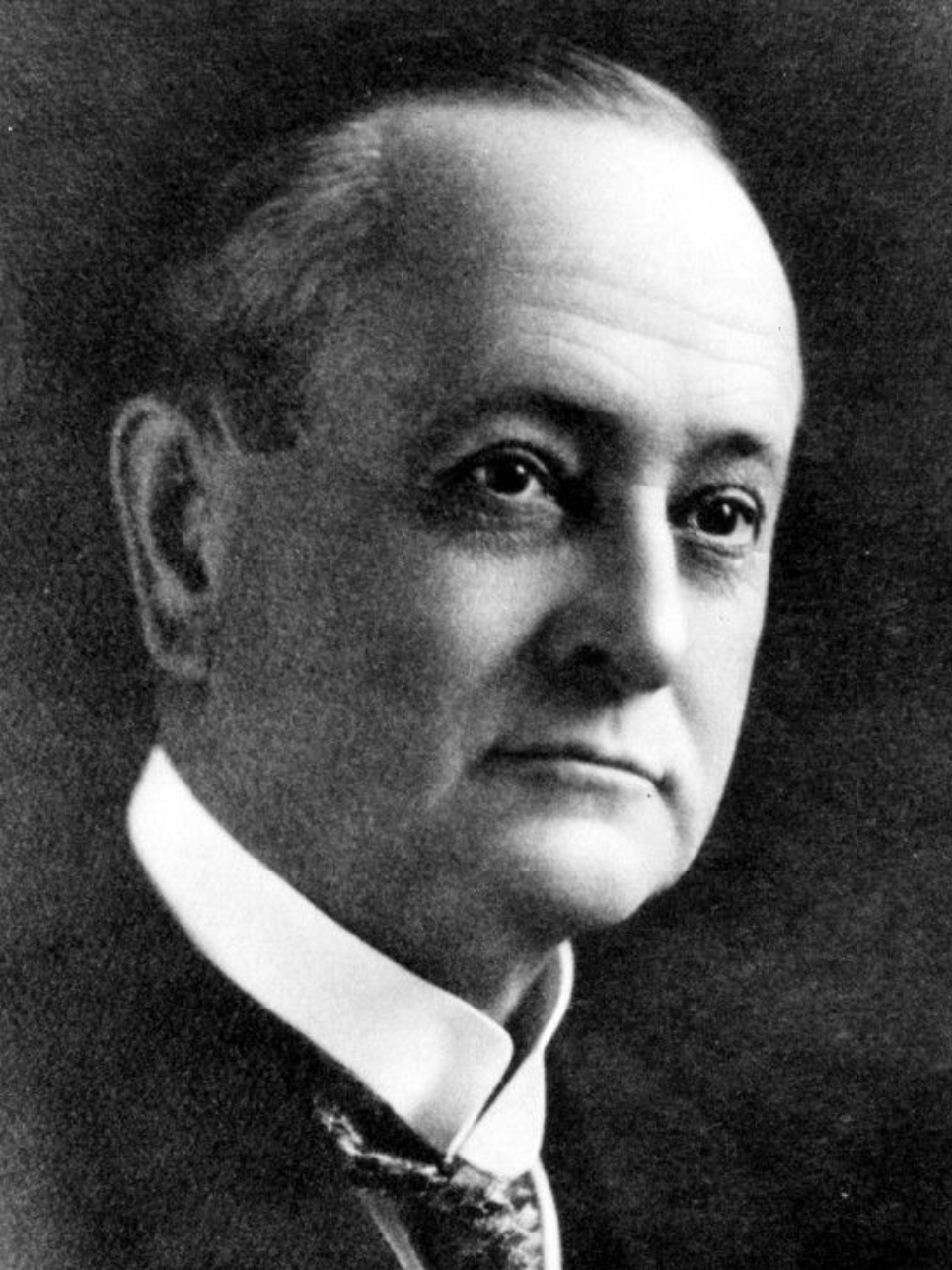

29th Mayor of Los Angeles
- In office July 1, 1913 – July 1, 1915
- Preceded by: George Alexander
- Succeeded by: Charles E. Sebastian

Personal details
- Born: November 27, 1856 Taycheedah, Wisconsin, U.S.
- Died: July 21, 1923 (aged 66) Los Angeles, California, U.S.

Henry Howard Rose (November 27, 1856 – July 21, 1923) was an American politician who served as the 29th Mayor of Los Angeles from July 1913 to July 1915, serving only for one term. He was regarded as "anti-unionist". He was at first against the Mulholland annexation proposal but, after taking office, he switched positions.

Born in Taycheedah, Wisconsin, he attended Fond du Lac High School and was admitted to the Wisconsin bar in 1881. He was a member of the Wisconsin National Guard from 1880 to 1888, then moved to Pasadena, California, to practice law. There, he was elected as justice of the peace in 1890 and as city recorder in 1891. He continued his practice working in Los Angeles municipal government and ran for mayor in 1913, defeating John W. Shenk in a runoff election. As mayor, he presided over the opening of the Owens Valley aqueduct.

According to the Los Angeles Times, Rose was: "[a] socialist and progressive, Rose was also a crack pistol shot, winning many matches, even against the police chief." He was a Mason and a member of the California Club.

Rose married Gertrude C. Ruggles in 1884. They had one child, named Augustus, before she died in 1909. Rose remarried to Leonie E. Klein in 1910.
