= W. B. Mathews =

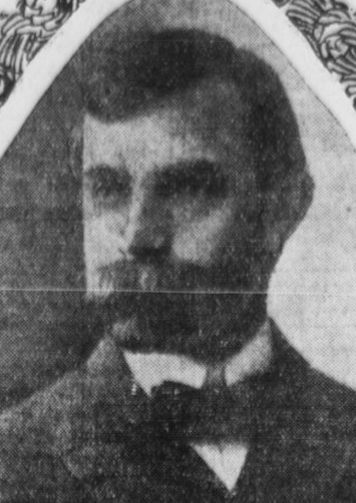

28th Los Angeles City Attorney
- In office 1900–1906
- Mayor: Walter F. Haas
- Preceded by: Leslie R. Hewitt

Personal details
- Born: 1865; Ohio
- Died: 1931 (aged 65–66)
- Political party: Republican
- Education: Centre College

William Burgess Mathews (1865–1931) was a "pioneer figure in the water development program of Los Angeles" and chief counsel for the Metropolitan Water District of Southern California. He was also city attorney of Los Angeles.

== Personal ==
Mathews was born in Ohio in 1865, and the family moved to Kentucky a year later, where he grew up. He was graduated from Centre College. He moved to Los Angeles in 1889.

He died in Good Samaritan Hospital in Los Angeles, on December 9, 1931, after an operation for intestinal trouble. He left his widow, Susan (died December 22, 1946); two daughters, Margaret Abbott of San Francisco and Caroline Mathews; and three sons, John H. Mathews, William W. Mathews and Samuel S. Mathews. A funeral service was conducted by the Reverend Herbert Booth Smith in Immanuel Presbyterian Church, and burial followed in Inglewood Cemetery.

== Vocation ==
=== Water law ===
Mathews became known as "one of the outstanding water law attorneys of the West".

He was admitted to the bar in Kentucky in 1888 and in California in 1889, when he was associated with LeCompte Davis and later with Thomas J. Curran. Mathews was one of the incorporators of the Johnhub Water Company of Colton, California, in 1897. He was elected Los Angeles city attorney in 1900 and was reelected twice, serving until 1909. He was then named general counsel of the Los Angeles Department of Water and Power, a position he held until 1929.

It was under the direction of Mr. Mathews that the city consummated the purchase of the City Water Company, a step that started the city on its long march toward obtaining an adequate water supply. He also directed the legal battle that resulted in the city acquiring the right to the water in the Los Angeles River. He bore the brunt of the legal work in the city's water development program in the Owens Valley . . . .

In 1929, Mathews took on a similar job with the Metropolitan Water District of Southern California, and he was a member of the Colorado River Commission.

=== Politics ===
In July 1906 Mathews announced his candidacy for nomination on the Republican ticket for Congress, but in August he dropped out because, he said, the committee in charge had not allowed enough time for campaigning.

== Legacy ==
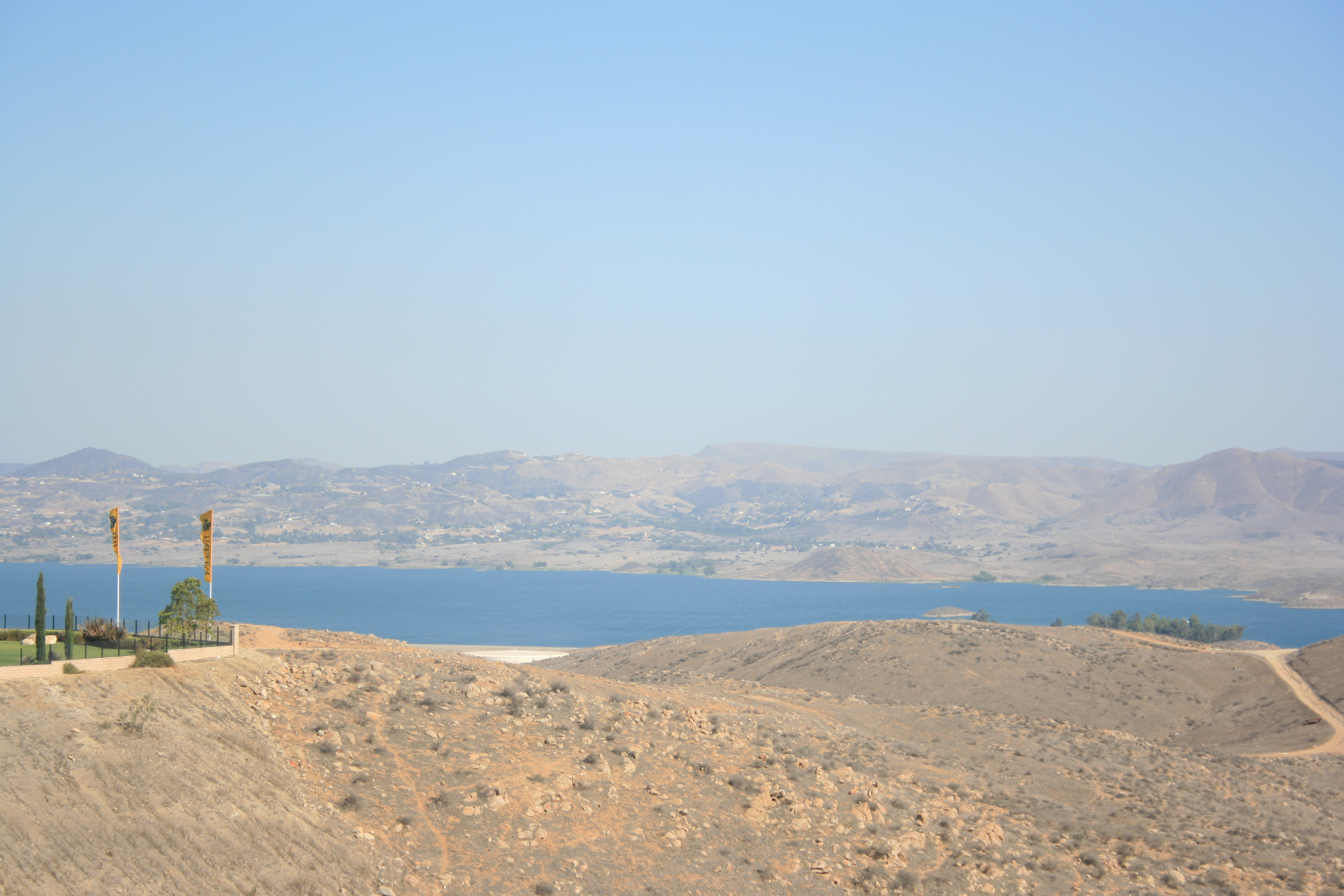
Lake Mathews

Mathews was memorialized in the name of Lake Mathews (previously the Cajalco Reservoir) in Riverside County, the western terminus for the Colorado River Aqueduct. It was dedicated to him in November 1940.

Preceded by Walter F. Haas	Los Angeles City Attorney; W.B. Mathews; 1900–06	Succeeded by Leslie R. Hewitt
