= Grant Cooper =

American defense attorney

Grant B. Cooper (April 1, 1903, in New York City – May 3, 1990), was the chief defense attorney in the murder trial against Sirhan Sirhan for the assassination of Robert F. Kennedy. Sirhan's more recent counsel has accused Cooper of deliberately throwing the Sirhan case as the result of a then-pending indictment against Cooper for possessing stolen transcripts of the grand jury proceedings in the Beverly Hills Friar's Club card cheating case. Cooper, who faced the possibility of jail time, was eventually fined $1000. Cooper died in 1990 of an aortic aneurysm.

== Notable cases ==
Besides his role as the lead attorney for Sirhan Sirhan, he also defended JPL co-founder Tsien Hsue-shen against charges of being a communist and facing deportation to China. He also represented mob boss Johnny Roselli in the Friar's Club case.

Cooper has represented several Hollywood actors, including Joan Bennett and Shirley Temple in her divorce from John Agar.

== Bar Association Leadership ==
In 1960, Cooper served as President of the Los Angeles County Bar Association.

From 1962 to 1963, Cooper was the president of the American College of Trial Lawyers.
