= Eleanor Joy Toll =

American educator and clubwoman

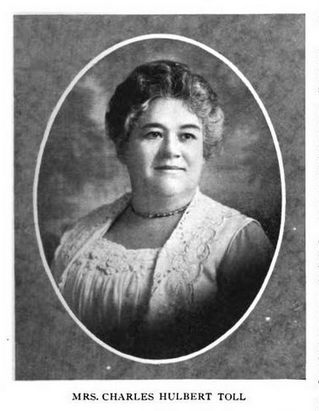
Eleanor Joy Toll, in a 1922 publication.

Eleanor Joy Toll (July 9, 1869 — February 2, 1926) was an American educator and clubwoman based in Southern California. She taught at Los Angeles High School, helped found the Glendale Symphony Orchestra, and was the first woman appointed as trustee on the board at Scripps College.

== Early life ==
Eleanor Margaret Joy was born in Winona, Minnesota, the daughter of William Henry Joy and Ruth Anna Morgan Joy. Her father served in the Union Army during the American Civil War. The family moved to California in 1875.

== Career ==
Eleanor Joy taught at Los Angeles High School before she was married. After her sons were in school, she became involved in the Parent-Teacher Federation of Glendale, serving as president, vice-president, and educational chair. In 1916 she founded the Mutual Benefit Reading Circle, a weekly book group for mothers that soon grew too large to meet in her home, and had to relocate to the city library; the format was copied nationally. In 1917, she was elected to the Glendale school board, and was president of the board for three years. In 1920, she was appointed a trustee of the California School for Girls in Ventura. She was the first woman appointed to the board of trustees at Scripps College; however, she died before she was able to serve.

As a clubwoman, Toll was a founding member of the Foothill Club, and president of the large and active Ebell Club of Los Angeles. She was also the founder and first president of the Glendale Symphony Orchestra Association.

== Personal life and legacy ==
Eleanor Joy was the first wife of Charles H. Toll, a banker; they married in 1901, and had four sons together. She died in 1926, after a heart attack, aged 56 years.

In 1927, the year after she died, the first dormitory at Scripps College opened, and was named Eleanor Joy Toll Hall in her memory. Similarly, Eleanor J. Toll Middle School in Glendale was named for her, months after she died. The Los Angeles headquarters of the California Federation of Women's Clubs was named the Eleanor Joy Toll Memorial Headquarters, also in 1927.

Her son Maynard J. Toll was a tax attorney in Los Angeles, a president of the Los Angeles County Bar Association in 1963, president of the city's school board and one of the founding trustees of the Los Angeles County Museum of Art. Her Glendale home, built in 1913 and designed by architect Charles Edwin Shattuck, was added to the Glendale Register of Historic Places in 1977.
