= Aurelius W. Hutton =

American judge (1847–1934)

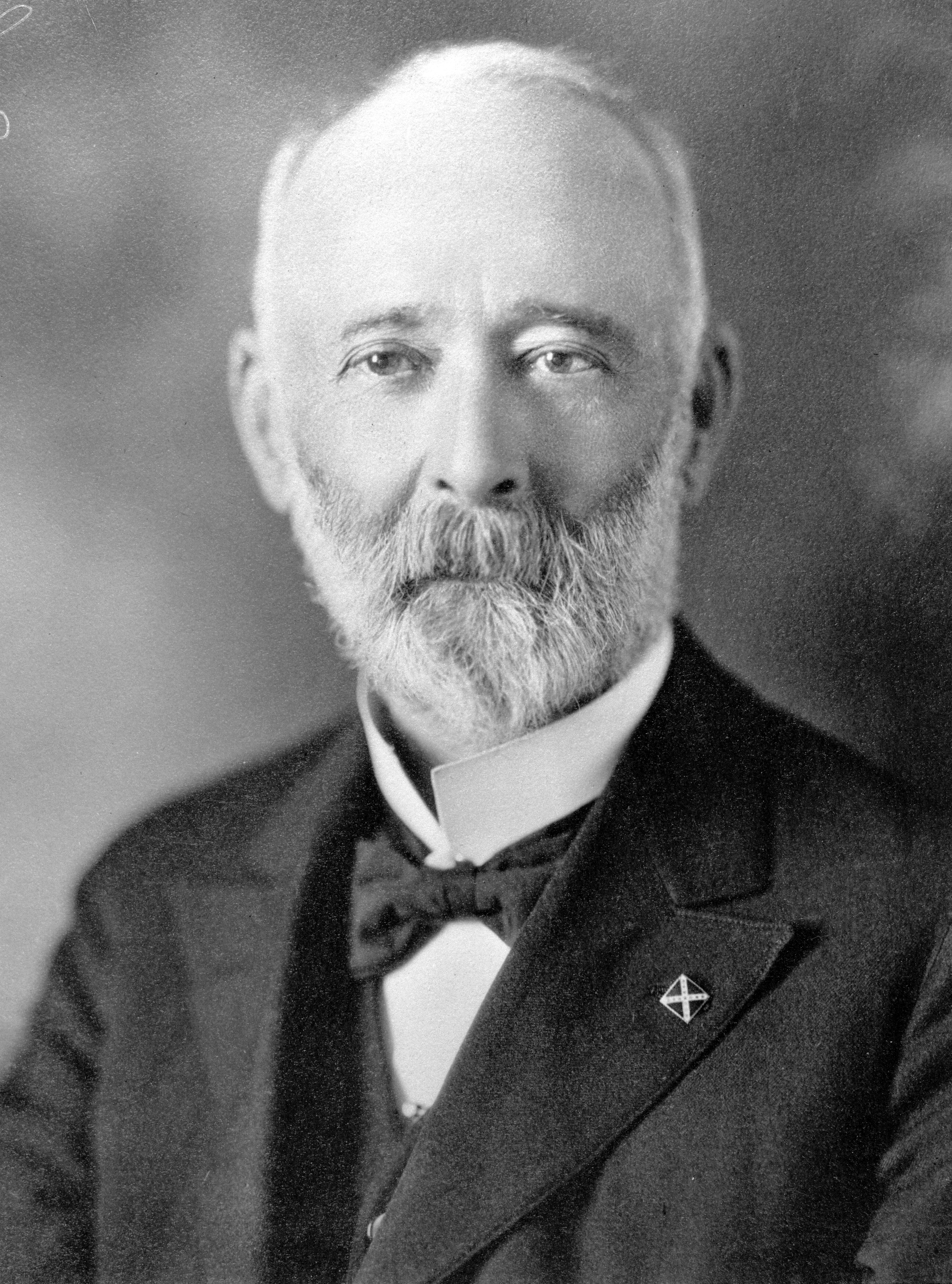

Justice of the Los Angeles County Superior Court
- In office 1875–1881

Personal details
- Born: July 23, 1847 Greene County, Alabama
- Died: January 11, 1934 (aged 86) Santa Monica, California
- Spouses: Elema Ward (m. 1832; died 1834) Anna Maria Matlack (m. 1846)
- Education: Virginia University
- Occupation: Jurist, writer

Aurelius W. Hutton (July 23, 1847 – January 11, 1934) was a Los Angeles County Superior Court judge and Los Angeles city attorney. He sat on a special jury that investigated charges made by land developer Abbot Kinney.

== Biography ==
Hutton was born in Greene County, Alabama, on July 23, 1847, and was educated at the University of Virginia. He came to Los Angeles in 1869 after having fought in the Confederate Army.

He was Los Angeles city attorney in 1872–76 and a judge of the Los Angeles County Superior Court. In August 1898, he was chairman of a rally at Hazard's Pavilion on behalf of James G. Maguire, candidate for governor of California.

In 1904 Hutton was chairman of a specially appointed jury that heard charges by real estate developer and fruit grower Abbot Kinney against A. H. Naftzger. president of the California Fruit Agency and nominal head of the Southern California Fruit Exchange. He filed a 15-page dissent against the acquittal of Naftzger.

He died at the age of 86 on January 11, 1934, in his home, 1704 Ocean View Avenue, Santa Monica. He was survived by his six children. His oldest son, Aurelius W. Hutton Jr. had died in 1895 at the age of 19.

Preceded by Frank H. Howard	Los Angeles City Attorney; Aurelius W. Hutton; 1872-76	Succeeded by John Franklin Godfrey
