= William Ellsworth Dunn =

American lawyer

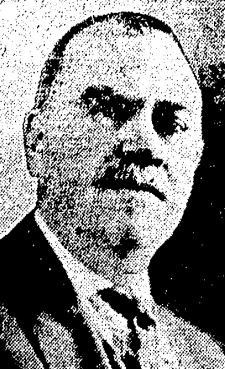
Dunn

William Ellsworth Dunn, or W.E. Dunn, (1861–1925) was the city attorney of Los Angeles, California, and represented various concerns of California capitalist Henry E. Huntington. He was a founder of the Gibson, Dunn & Crutcher law firm.

== Personal ==
Dunn was born on August 2, 1861, in Douglas, Michigan, or in Saagetuck, Maine, the son of George E. Dunn and Ellen V. Dickinson. He attended Allegan High School in Allegan, Michigan, followed by a year of preparatory school and then a year in the law department of the University of Michigan.

He was married to Nellie M. Briggs on January 3, 1883, in Grand Rapids, Michigan. In 1885 he moved to Los Angeles, where he continued his law studies, and he was admitted to the bar in 1887.

A Republican, Dunn was a member of the California Club, the Jonathan Club, the Los Angeles Country Club and the Bolsa Chica Club.

Dunn died August 22, 1925, "apparently from apoplexy." Cremation took place August 24 at Hollywood Cemetery after a Christian Science service. Survivors were his wife; a brother, George Dunn of Chicago, and a sister. Streetcars of the Los Angeles Railway, of which he was a vice president, were to stop service for one minute to mark the beginning of the funeral rite.

== Career ==
Dunn was appointed assistant city attorney in Los Angeles in 1890, and in 1890 he was elected as city attorney, reelected in 1892. During those years he represented the city in its legal disputes with the Los Angeles Water Co. over the amount the company should pay to the city for its water. After the end of his second elected term, the city appointed him as a special counsel to carry on the litigation.

In private practice, Dunn was a founding partner of Gibson, Dunn & Crutcher, specializing in corporation law. He was legal adviser to the Pacific Electric Railway, the Los Angeles Railway, the Los Angeles-Redondo Railway and various enterprises of capitalist Henry E. Huntington.

Preceded by Charles H. McFarland	Los Angeles City Attorney; William Ellsworth Dunn; 1894–98	Succeeded by Walter F. Haas
