= Charles S. Burnell =

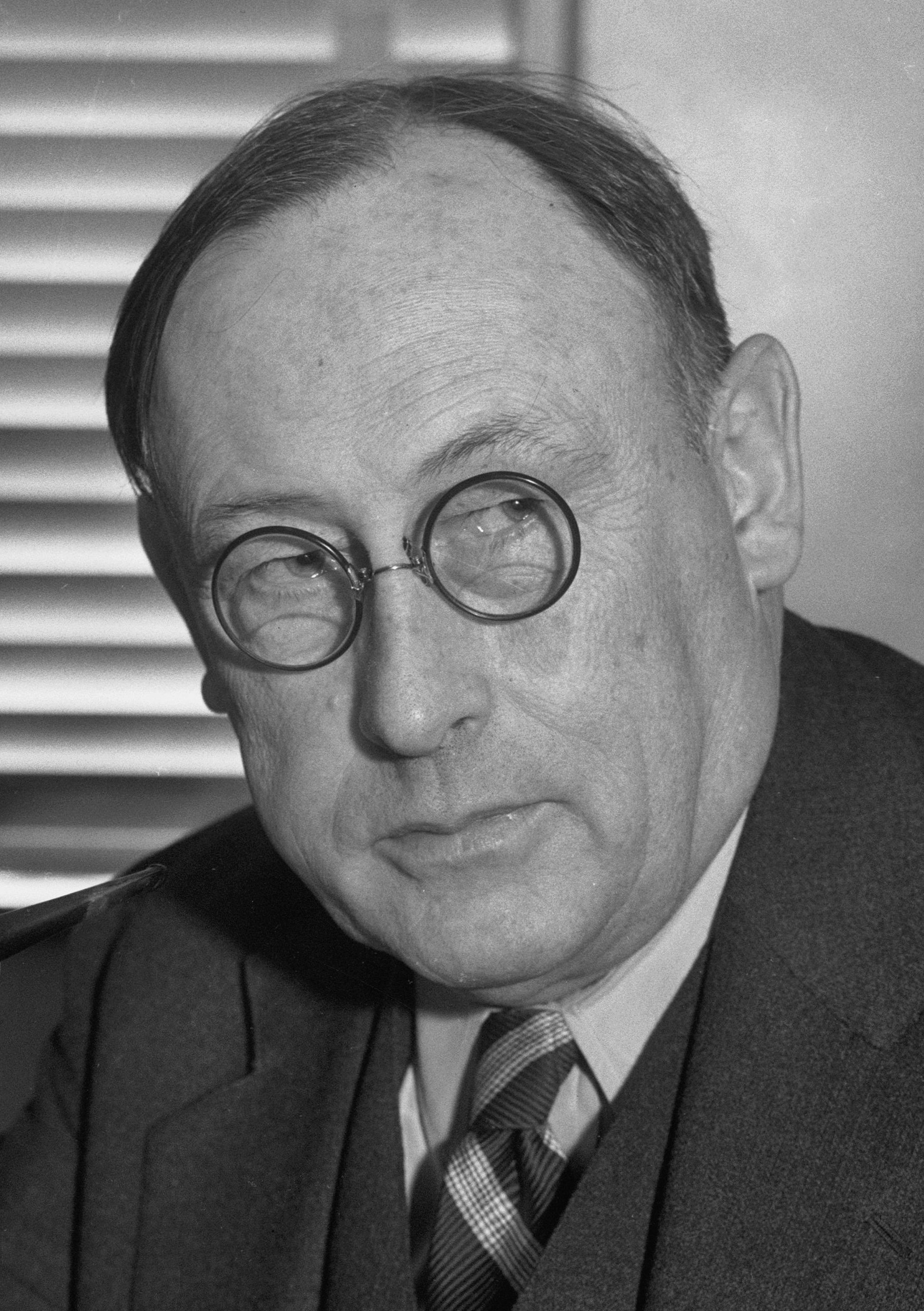
Burnell in 1936.

Charles S. Burnell (September 21, 1874 – June 23, 1949) served 21 years as a judge in Los Angeles County, California, presiding over trials that sometimes involved Hollywood motion-picture personalities. Several opinions from higher courts castigated or chastised Burnell for his activities or statements in court.

== Personal ==
Burnell was born on September 21, 1874, in Elko, Nevada, to S. M. and Anna Smith; as an infant he was adopted by his stepfather, Martin Burnell. He was brought to California when he was a year old. He was educated in private schools in Sonoma County, California, and graduated from Lowell High School in San Francisco. He received a Bachelor of Arts degree in the first graduating class of Stanford University in 1895. He earned a master of arts from Stanford in 1896, and he was later given an honorary doctor of laws degree from Loyola University in Los Angeles.

Burnell and Blanche Iola Emery were married in 1907, and they had a daughter, Dorothy. In 1934, Blanche was granted a divorce in Los Angeles on the grounds of desertion after a decree had been refused in Reno, Nevada, in 1931. In 1936 he married Agnes Storey Smith in Sandpoint, Idaho, whom he had met while on a vacation in Alaska; he adopted her daughter, Beth.

He was a member of Palestine Masonic Lodge 351, the University Club (in Los Angeles), Stanford Club, Chaparral Club and the Hollywood Golf and Country Club.

Burnell, of 170 South Vista Street in the Fairfax neighborhood of Los Angeles, died in Sebastopol, California, on June 23, 1949, while on vacation in Sonoma County. His death was attributed to a heart attack. He was buried in Forest Lawn Memorial Park, Glendale, after an "unusually brief funeral service" in the Church of the Recessional that "consisted almost solely of a poem written by the judge himself," and was preceded by a "short eulogy" by Superior Judge Charles E. Haas, "a friend of Judge Burnell's for 55 years." Burnell had been known as the "poet laureate of the bench."

== Vocation ==
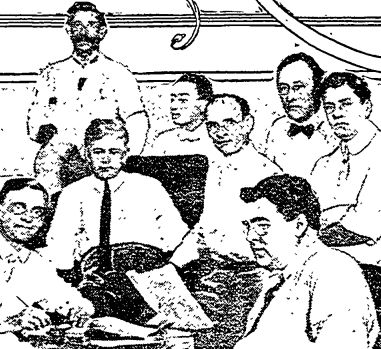
Assistant City Attorney Burnell in center, with glasses and looking at camera, surrounded by other lawyers who were working on a Silver Lake Park condemnation suit in 1913

Burnell practiced law in San Francisco from 1896 until he resettled in Los Angeles in 1906. As an attorney, he drew attention when he filed a legal paper written entirely in verse. He was assistant city attorney between 1913 and 1918 when he became a special counsel for the Los Angeles County Flood Control District. In 1919 he was elected city attorney, serving for two years until he was chosen by voters for the Los Angeles County Superior Court.

From 1924 to 1932 he was a professor of constitutional law at Loyola University.

In July 1925 Burnell made news when he allowed attorneys and court officials (including himself) the right to remove their jackets during hot-weather days, and then he dashed off a poem to mark the event:

Oh, why should judges stew and sweat,
As hot and hotter it doth get.
Can they not justice fine dispense
Without such suffering intense?
Why should we not our coats remove—
Our sense of freedom to improve—
And show our shirts (if clean they be)
Without a loss of dignity?

=== Controversies and notable cases ===
In 1948 three justices of the District Court of Appeal castigated Burnell for his "improper conduct," which the Los Angeles Times called "the latest of several directed at Judge Burnell by the high tribunal over the years." "For the first time, however," the Times added, "two of the Appeal Court justices made a point of outlining how the offending jurist might be removed from the bench." The two judges noted that the State Judicial Commission could retire a jurist "for reason of mental disability that is, or is like to become[,] of a permanent character" or that a two-thirds vote of each house of the Legislature could oust him.

Controversies and notable cases included:

- Burnell's 1927 proposal of a contract-term marriage as a "cure for the divorce evil" brought a "storm of protest from the local clergy which threatened to recall him from the bench." The next year, when a jury deliberating a bad check charge reported it was divided 10-2, he caused a furor "by directing the bailiff to order ten dinners and two bunches of carrots" for the jurymen.
- In 1936 he presided over a manslaughter trial in which film director and choreographer Busby Berkeley was accused of causing the deaths of three people in an automobile accident. That trial ended in a hung jury, and Burnell was then scheduled to handle a second trial. Instead, he was abruptly transferred from the criminal to the civil department of Superior Court, and he demanded an investigation in a letter he sent to all his fellow judges and to the press. Burnell said he had received a telephone message urging him to "give Berkeley all the breaks" or he would be removed from the criminal courts docket. But Presiding Judge Douglas L. Edmonds said the transfer had been ordered the preceding year and that Edmonds was not acquainted with the Berkeley case.
- Burnell was accused in 1939 of being "biased and prejudiced" in a divorce case in which he awarded custody of two children to their father instead of their mother. The woman charged that Burnell favored husbands over wives "because of his own domestic troubles which ended in divorce" five years previous. She asked that the decision be set aside and that Burnell be taken off the case. Burnell said his relation with his former wife was "most cordial" and that he was "not soured" against wives because of that situation." The mother's contention was dismissed in her appeal to Superior Judge Hartley Shaw.

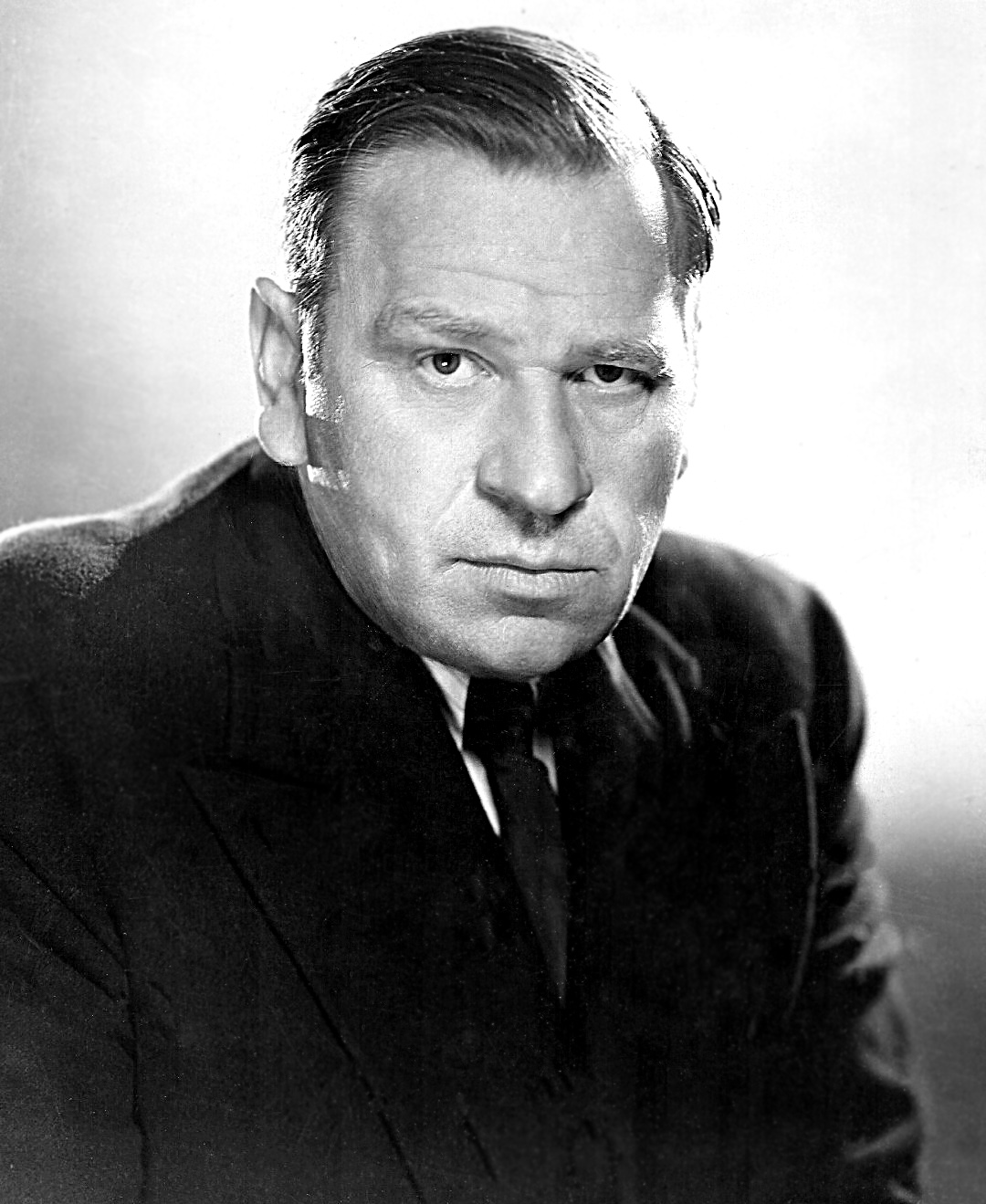
Wallace Beery

- The judge presided over the 1941 trial of film actor Wallace Beery and four Beverly Hills, California, police officers, accused of malicious prosecution and the false arrest of a former Beery friend, Allan B. Whitney, at Beery's home. A jury found that all were innocent, and after the trial Burnell told the jury members that "If there ever were a case tried before me where there was a holdup—in other words an effort to enrich one's self at the expense of someone else—this was the case."
- Burnell issued a "precedent-establishing" decision in a case pitting actress Olivia de Havilland against Warner Brothers when he ruled that her seven-year contract should run for seven calendar years, without deductions for the numerous times that the studio had suspended her for refusing roles that she felt were "unsuited to her ability" and therefore she was not working.
- He granted a divorce in 1943 to Jane Fowler, the wife of film editor Gene Fowler Jr., who had testified that her husband's treatment of her caused her to lose twenty pounds in two weeks. "Women never complain about losing weight until they ask for a divorce—otherwise they brag about it," Burnell remarked.

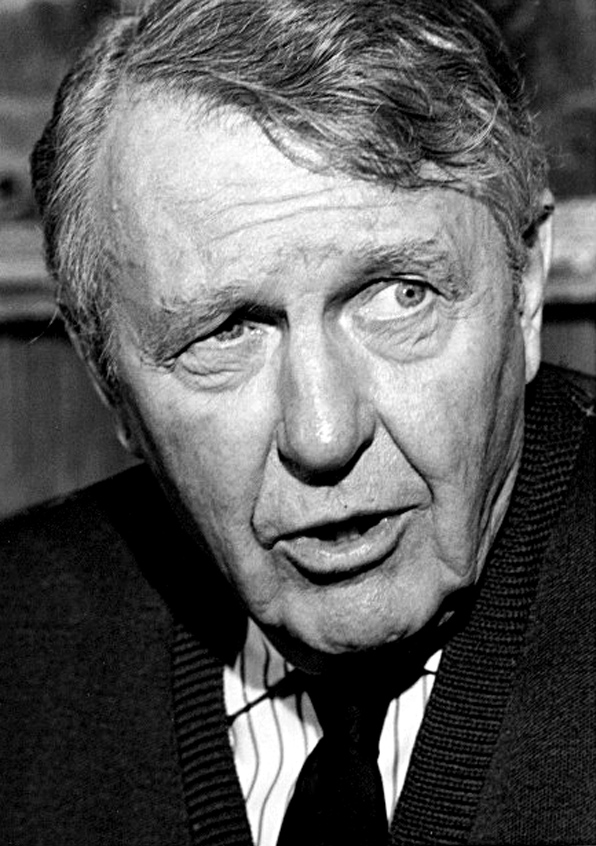
Ralph Bellamy

- In 1946, Burnell apportioned $134,700 in damages caused by a 1938 flood in Glendale, California, among 11 claimants, including film actor Ralph Bellamy, after a jury found that the Los Angeles County Flood Control District was negligent in work it had done in the Los Angeles River channel. Bellamy got $25,000 for damage to his house.
- He "waxed hot under his judicial collar," as the Los Angeles Times put it, when in 1946 city workers dug a trench in front of his house and filled it "with a substance that the jurist asserts is softer than warm custard, and just as gooey." In a "caustic letter" to the Board of Public Works, he "good-naturedly suggested" that the street be repaired and

you might ask the Mayor [ Fletcher Bowron ] to do it personally. I notice he is getting a little overweight and the exercise would do him good and take his mind off fighting with the City Council. Or you might ask the members of that body to do the job. I think they would all be better off, and so would the public if they were doing a little honest work instead of making damned fools of themselves . . . .

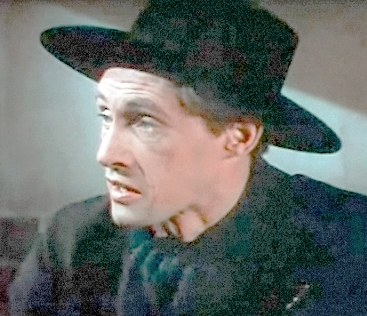
John Carradine

- Refusing to grant actor John Carradine a delay in his 1946 attempt to set aside an out-of-court property settlement with his wife, Ardanella C. Carradine, Burnell forced Carradine to fly to Los Angeles from Cohasset, Massachusetts, where he was appearing in a play, to testify. Burnell dismissed Carradine's attempt to break the settlement with the remark that the actor "was so anxious to get rid of his marital bond that he would have signed anything" in order to marry his next wife, Sonia Sorel.
- Burnell refused a divorce to actress Virginia Engels in 1947 on the grounds that she and her husband had agreed to the breakup. "This is a typical motion-picture divorce," he said. "It's in keeping with the Hollywood idea of giving the marriage no fair trial. . . . This is collusion. Decree denied."

=== Metropolitan News-Enterprise series ===
In April 2001 Roger M. Grace, a lawyer and columnist for the legal newspaper Metropolitan News-Enterprise, wrote a three-piece series whose headlines called Burnell a "Judicial Tyrant of Many Years Past" and "A Barb-Spewing Jurist." Grace wrote that Burnell had been chastised by appellate courts or individual higher judges for his remarks and actions in court. Grace's text noted that:

A source of particular consternation to the bar and fellow judges for a three-decade period in the first half of the last century . . . . was . . . Charles S. Burnell. Near the end of his career, two justices in a Court of Appeal opinion called for his removal from the bench either by a judicial commission, based on mental disability, or by the Legislature through the impeachment process. . . . A string of smart-aleck statements by the judge [were] aimed at defense lawyers. . . . . [Burnell had] a propensity for popping off. . . . [He was] long in tenure, short of fuse. His oppressiveness and his continual in-court utterance of insults is immortalized in opinions contained in the Official Reports. . . . The gibes included an insinuation that the plaintiff's counsel was not much of a lawyer and a remark that a witness "took a nice little nap on the witness stand when he wasn't testifying."

== References and notes ==
Preceded by Alfred Lee Stephens	Los Angeles City Attorney; Charles S. Burnell; 1919–21	Succeeded by Jess E. Stephens
