= James Wilfred McKinley =

American lawyer

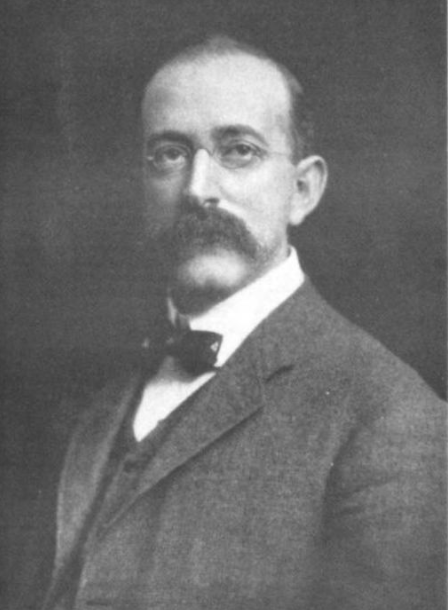

Los Angeles City Attorney
- In office 1884–1886
- Preceded by: Walter D. Stephenson
- Succeeded by: J.C. Daly

Personal details
- Born: April 24, 1857; New Castle, Pennsylvania
- Died: May 11, 1918 (aged 61); Los Angeles, California

James Wilfred McKinley (April 24, 1857 – May 11, 1918) was city attorney of Los Angeles, California, and a judge of the Superior Court in that state as well as a regent of the University of California.

== Personal ==
McKinley was born on April 24, 1857, in New Castle, Pennsylvania, to Samuel McKinley and Harriet Newell Simpson McKinley. He was educated in a New Castle public school, and he attended the University of Pennsylvania (1876–77) and the University of Michigan (1877–79), where he was graduated with a Bachelor of Science degree. He came to California in 1883.

He was married to Lillian Elder on October 7, 1886, and they had a son, James W. McKinley Jr. The older McKinley was a member of the Jonathan Club, the University Club, the Masons and the Knights Templar. He was also a member of the Sunset Club and the Union League clubs of Los Angeles and of San Francisco.

McKinley died of a paralytic stroke in his home, 508 West Adams Street, on May 11, 1918. A funeral service at St. John's Church drew hundreds of attendees. Interment was at Inglewood Cemetery.

== Vocation ==
In 1881 he was admitted to the bar in New Castle, and two years later he came to California and formed a law partnership with J.F. Hutton. After Hutton's death, McKinley became a partner with W.T. Williams. McKinley was elected city attorney in 1884, was reelected in 1886 and served until 1888.

In 1889 he was appointed judge in the Superior Court and then was elected to the post, serving until January 1897.

As an attorney, he represented the Southern Pacific Railroad and the Pacific Electric Railway. He was on the board of directors of the Commercial National Bank and the Market and Produce Bank.

McKinley went into politics and was chairman of the California delegation to the 1904 Republican National Convention, and he was chairman of the California Republican Convention of 1906.

In 1903 he was appointed a regent of the University of California.

Preceded by Walter D. Stephenson	Los Angeles City Attorney; James Wilfred McKinley; 1884-86	Succeeded by J.C. Daly
