= Los Angeles City Attorney =

Elected official of Los Angeles

- Seal of Los Angeles

- Flag of Los Angeles

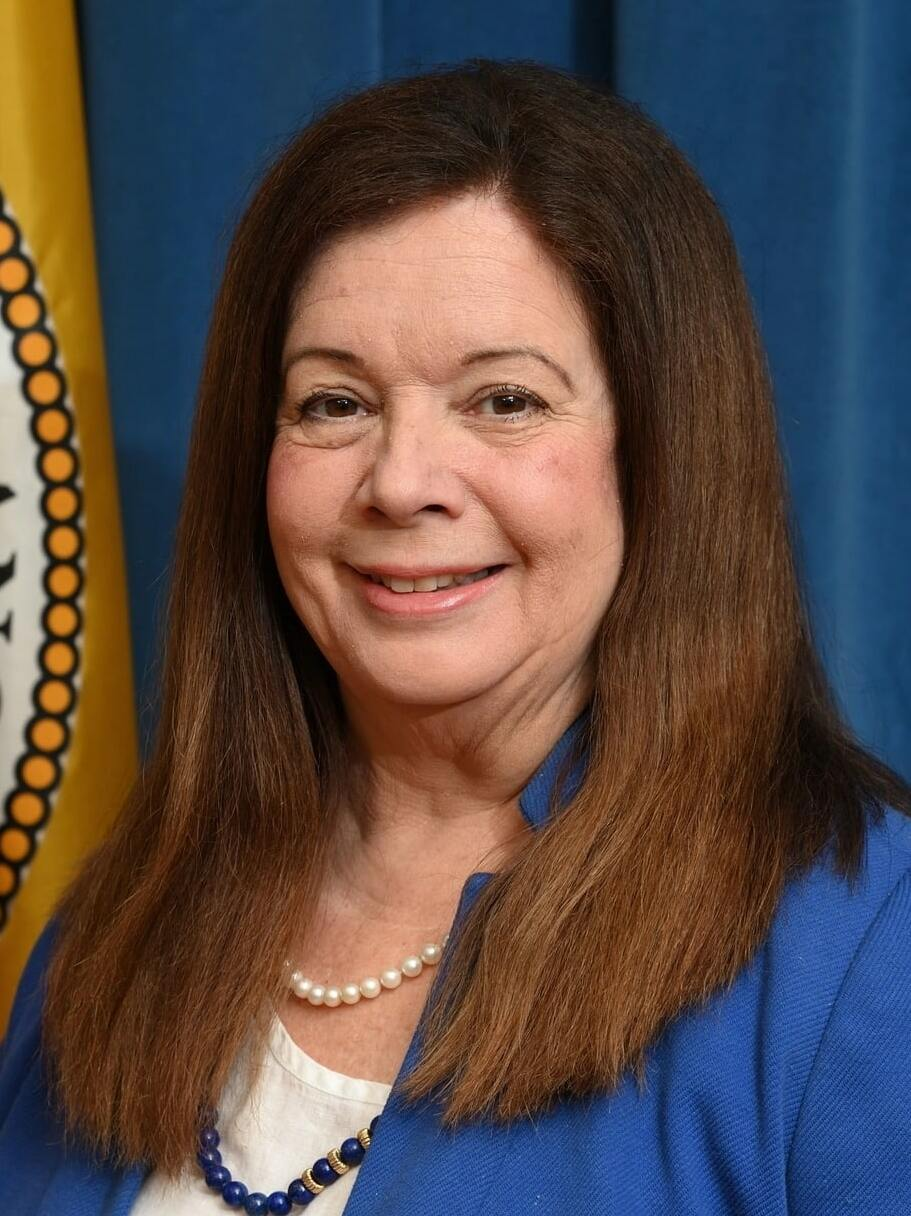
- Incumbent; Hydee Feldstein Soto since December 12, 2022
- Type: City attorney
- Appointer: Direct election
- Term length: 4 years
- Website: cityattorney.lacity.gov

The Los Angeles City Attorney is an elected official who serves as the City of Los Angeles' government's lawyer and as a criminal prosecutor for misdemeanor offenses only. The City Attorney is elected for four years, and the City Charter requires the city attorney to be a lawyer qualified to practice in the California courts for five years preceding their election. In addition the General Counsel Division of the office provides legal counsel for the city and represents it in civil actions. It is not to confused with the Los Angeles County District Attorney, who is an elected official who serves a four year term and is the criminal prosecutor for the County of Los Angeles for both felony and misdemeanor offenses.

== List of Los Angeles city attorneys ==
| Image | Name | Term |
|---|---|---|
| | Benjamin Hayes | 1850–1851 |
| | William G. Dryden | 1851–1852 |
| | Joseph Lancaster Brent | 1852–1853 |
| | Charles E. Carr | 1853 |
| | Joseph Lancaster Brent | 1853 |
| | Isaac Hartman | 1854–1855 |
| | Lewis Granger | 1855–1856 |
| | Cameron E. Thom | 1856–1858 |
| | James H. Lader | 1858–1859 |
| | Samuel F. Reynolds | 1859–1861 |
| | James H. Lader | 1861–1862 |
| | Myer J. Newmark | 1862 |
| | Alfred Chapman | 1862–1865 |
| | James H. Lader | 1865 |
| | Andrew J. King | 1866–1868 |
| | Charles H. Larrabee | 1868 (did not serve) (Note: "The election took place as ordered by the council on April 6, 1868. All officials were duly elected on that date and certified on the 9th of April, three days later, but did not hold a single session. Instead, the existing administration continued to function until December 7, 1868. The April election seems to have been wholly ignored." Chronological Record of Los Angeles City Officials 1850–1938, Municipal Reference Library, March 1938, reprinted 1946.) |
| | William McPherson | 1868–1870 |
| | Frank H. Howard | 1870–1872 |
| | Aurelius W. Hutton | 1872–1876 |
| | John F. Godfrey | 1876–1880 |
| | Henry T. Hazard | 1880–1882 |
| | Walter D. Stephenson | 1882–1884 |
| | James Wilfred McKinley | 1884–1886 |
| | J. C. Daly | 1886–1888 |
| | Charles H. McFarland | 1888–1894 |
| | William Ellsworth Dunn | 1894–1898 |
| | Walter F. Haas | 1898–1900 |
| | W. B. Mathews | 1900–1906 |
| | Leslie R. Hewitt | 1906–1910 |
| | John W. Shenk | 1910–1913 |
| | Albert Lee Stephens Sr. | 1913–1919 |
| | Charles S. Burnell | 1919–1921 |
| | Jess E. Stephens | 1921–1929 |
| | Erwin P. Werner | 1929–1933 |
| | Ray L. Chesebro | 1933–1953 |
| | Roger Arnebergh | 1953–1973 |
| | Burt Pines | 1973–1981 |
| | Ira Reiner | 1981–1985 |
| | James Hahn | 1985–2001 |
| | Rocky Delgadillo | 2001–2009 |
| | Carmen Trutanich | 2009–2013 |
| | Mike Feuer | 2013–2022 |
| | Hydee Feldstein Soto | 2022–present |
| | Marissa Roy (elect) | 2026 |
