= John W. Shenk =

American judge (1875–1959)

John Wesley Shenk
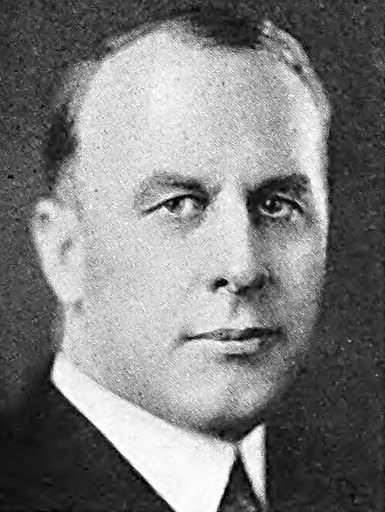

Associate Justice of the California Supreme Court
- In office April 14, 1924 – August 3, 1959
- Appointed by: Governor Friend W. Richardson
- Preceded by: Louis W. Myers
- Succeeded by: Thomas P. White

Los Angeles City Attorney
- In office 1910–1913
- Appointed by: Direct election
- Preceded by: Leslie R. Hewitt
- Succeeded by: Albert Lee Stephens Sr.

Personal details
- Born: February 7, 1875 Shelburne, Vermont, U.S.
- Died: August 3, 1959 (aged 84) Los Altos, California, U.S.
- Spouse: Lena R. Custer (m. 1907)
- Education: Ohio Wesleyan University (BA); University of Michigan School of Law (LLB)

John Wesley Shenk (February 7, 1875 – August 3, 1959) was a city attorney in Los Angeles, California, a Superior Court judge and a member of the California Supreme Court.

== Early life and education ==
Shenk was born on February 7, 1875, in Shelburne, Vermont, the son of John Wesley Shenk of Cobleskill, New York, who was a Methodist minister (died July 1922), and Susannah C. Brooks (died April 1929). He had three brothers, William W., Edmund S. and Adolphus B., and two sisters, Carrie M. (Wilson) and Susannah C. (McRae). He was educated in Shelbourne and in Omaha, Nebraska, public schools and received a Bachelor of Arts degree from Ohio Wesleyan University and a law degree from the University of Michigan School of Law in 1903, after which he passed an oral examination for the bar before the California Supreme Court. He later received honorary doctor of laws degrees from both universities and from the University of Southern California.

== Career ==
=== Non-legal ===
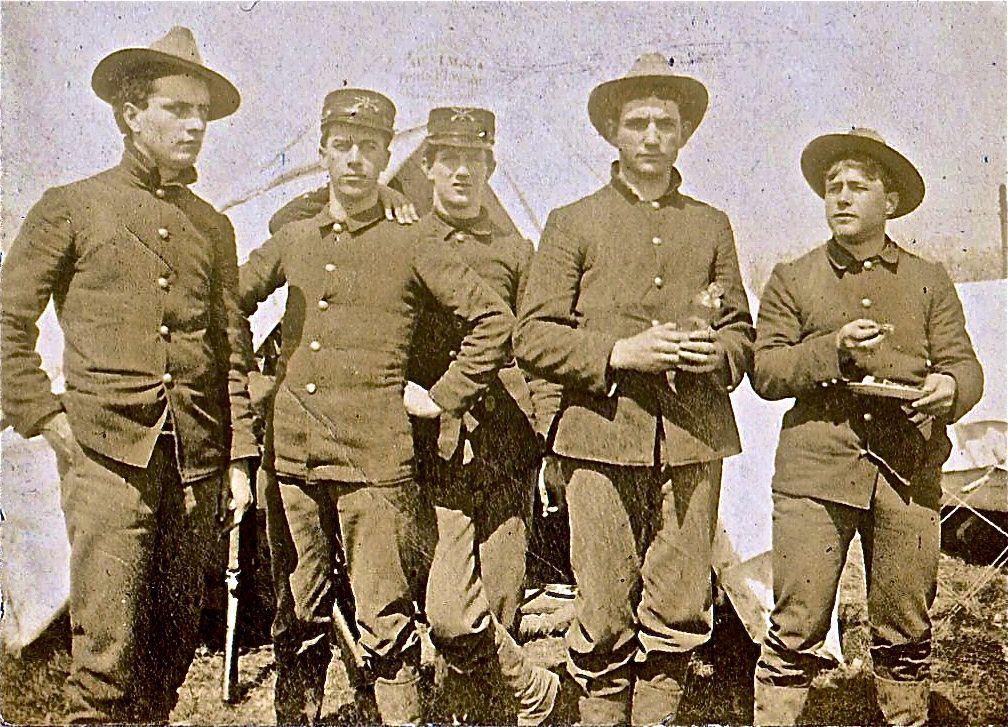
Shenk, second from left, with other U.S soldiers during the Spanish–American War

In Shenk's youth, he was a printer, farmer, painter and newspaper reporter. He was a soldier during the 1898 Spanish–American War when he was with the 4th Ohio Infantry, which saw service in Puerto Rico. After the war, he joined his brother Adolphus in the Imperial Valley as a farm hand and mule skinner, then, at the age of 26, as a school teacher.

=== Legal ===
==== Los Angeles ====
In 1906 Shenk was appointed a deputy city attorney in Los Angeles, California, and in 1909 he became city attorney when Leslie R. Hewitt resigned from that position. During his term, the cities of Wilmington and San Pedro, were merged with the city of Los Angeles, and Shenk later recalled "a midnight trip midst irate farmers and sharp-toothed watch dogs as he hurriedly listing polling places and secured names of election officers for the required ordinance calling the annexation election." Shenk was in charge of the city's legal office when Los Angeles annexed the San Fernando Valley and began the Owens River Project to bring water to the city through the Los Angeles Aqueduct.

In a memorial tribute to Shenk written after his death, U.S. Judge Stanley N. Barnes recalled Shenk's role in a controversy between the city and the Pacific Electric Railway, which wanted to lay a spur railroad track to some land in San Pedro to which it claimed ownership. Barnes said:

It was necessary to cross First Street in San Pedro. City Attorney Shenk said this required a franchise. By way of answer, and over the Labor Day weekend and holiday, the Pacific Electric hurriedly installed the track over the street—relying on the absence of judges and injunctions over the holidays and a fait accompli. The Board of Public Works, acting on the advice of John Shenk, paid back in kind on the following weekend. It took men, horses and equipment to the harbor, took possession of the empty railroad cars after removing them, tore up the tracks and announced the city was and would remain in possession. The Outer Harbor was saved for the people of Los Angeles.

Barnes added in regard to Shenk's influence: "Then there was the development of municipal power; the "Hyperion" sewer problem; the famous Griffith Park case ... the acquisition of the Los Angeles Public Library site; [and] the Water District Act of 1913—still known as the Shenk Act.

==== The Shenk Decision ====
In 1912, the mayor asked Shenk to investigate an incident in which African American businessman C.W. Holden was charged a dollar for a beer at a saloon where white customers were charged only five cents for the same order. Shenk's decision "that businesses had the right to charge whatever they desired and could change their prices at will," resulted in unprecedented discrimination against African Americans throughout the city. The effects of the Shenk Decision were chronicled in Los Angeles's African American newspapers, which included the California Eagle and the weekly newsmagazine, the Liberator which asserted, "by a ruling as city attorney, Mr. Shenk completely nullified the Civil Rights bill in this state."

==== The 1913 Mayoral Race ====
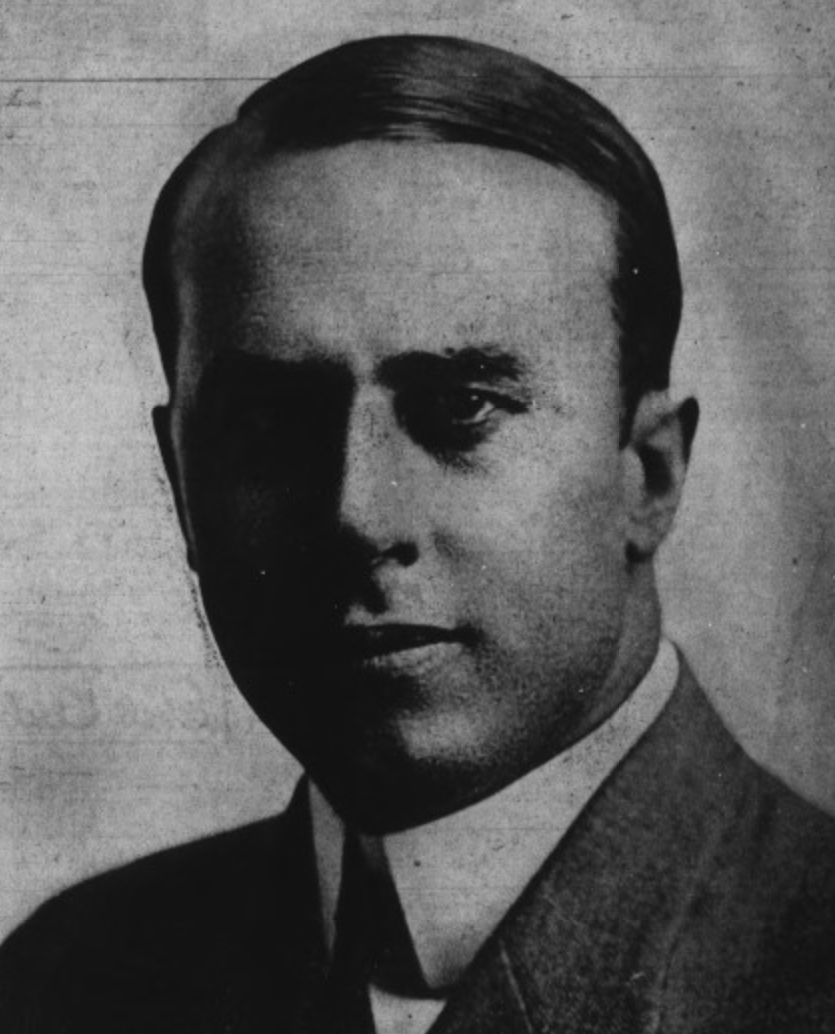
Shenk in 1913.

In 1913, Shenk ran for Mayor of Los Angeles as the candidate of the "good government" Municipal Conference. Based on Shenk's discriminatory decision the year before, African American newspapers urged their readers to vote against Shenk. Shenk lost to the independent candidate, city Police Judge Henry H. Rose by just over nine thousand votes at a time when, according to the Liberator, African Americans represented fifteen thousand votes.

In July 1913, after stepping down as City Attorney Shenk returned to private practice with E. R. Young, who had served as chief assistant City Attorney.

In August 1913, Governor Hiram Johnson appointed Shenk to succeed Nathaniel P. Conrey as a judge in the Los Angeles Superior Court. In November 1914, Shenk was elected to a full term on the court.

==== Supreme Court ====
In 1924, Governor Friend W. Richardson named Shenk as an associate justice of the California Supreme Court, where he sat for 35 years and wrote 1,355 opinions.

Among his more notable decisions was the 1945 decision for a unanimous court in Alfafara v. Fross that Filipino-Americans were not aliens under the definition of the California constitution and therefore were eligible to buy and sell property in the state.

Another notable opinion was his 1948 dissent in the case of Perez v. Sharp, in which the court held by a vote of 4 to 3 that interracial bans on marriage violated the Fourteenth Amendment to the United States Constitution and therefore were illegal in California. The opinion was the first of any state to strike down an anti-miscegenation law in the United States. In his dissent, joined by B. Rey Schauer and Homer R. Spence, Shenk wrote:

The power of a state to regulate and control the basic social relationship of marriage of its domiciliaries is here challenged and set at nought by a majority order of this court arrived at not by a concurrence of reasons but by the result of four votes supported by divergent concepts not supported by authority and in fact contrary to the decisions in this state and elsewhere. ... such laws have been in effect in this country since before our national independence and in this state since our first legislative session. They have never been declared unconstitutional by any court in the land although frequently they have been under attack. It is difficult to see why such laws, valid when enacted and constitutionally enforceable in this state for nearly 100 years and elsewhere for a much longer period of time, are now unconstitutional under the same Constitution and with no change in the factual situation. It will also be shown that they have a valid legislative purpose even though they may not conform to the sociogenetic views of some people. When that legislative purpose appears it is entirely beyond judicial power, properly exercised, to nullify them.

=== Death ===
Shenk died on August 3, 1959, while still in office.

== Clubs ==
He was a Shriner and Knight Templar and a member of Lodge No. 99, Benevolent & Protective Order of Elks, Sons of the Revolution, Beta Theta Pi college fraternity and Phi Delta Phi legal fraternity, the Jonathan Club of Los Angeles and the Commonwealth Club of San Francisco. He was master of South Pasadena Masonic Lodge No. 367 and was a member of the Order of the Red Cross of Constantine.

== Personal life ==
On June 28, 1907, Shenk was married to Lena R. Custer in Los Angeles. They had two sons, Samuel Custer and John Wesley Jr. During the last 35 years of his life, he lived in Los Altos, California, where he was active in establishing a union church.

== See also ==
- List of justices of the Supreme Court of California

Political offices
| Preceded by Leslie R. Hewitt | Los Angeles City Attorney; John W. Shenk; 1910–1913 | Succeeded by Albert Lee Stephens Sr. |
| Preceded by Louis W. Myers | Associate Justice of the California Supreme Court; 1924–1959 | Succeeded by Thomas P. White |
