= Walter F. Haas =

American lawyer

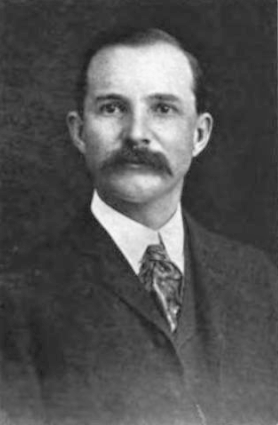
- Walter F. Haas

28th Los Angeles City Attorney
- In office 1898–1900
- Governor: Henry Tifft Gage
- Preceded by: William Ellsworth Dunn
- Succeeded by: W. B. Mathews
- Constituency: City of Los Angeles

Personal details
- Born: November 12, 1869; California, Missouri
- Died: February 17, 1936 (aged 66); Alhambra, California
- Resting place: Forest Lawn Memorial Park
- Political party: Republican
- Parents: John B. Haas (father); Lina W. Bruere (mother)
- Education: Los Angeles High School
- Occupation: Employers: Fidelia Investment Company (President); C. J. Kubach Company (Vice-president); Boards: German-American Bank (Director); K&K Brick Company (Director)
- Profession: Attorney

Walter F. Haas (November 12, 1869–February 17, 1936) was the city attorney of Los Angeles, California. He was an authority on water and riparian water rights.

== Personal ==
Haas, the eldest in a family of eight children, was born November 12, 1869, in California, Missouri, the son of John B. Haas and Lina W. Bruere. He was brought to Los Angeles at the age of 15 in 1884 or 1885 and graduated from Los Angeles High School in 1889, after which he read law in the office of Houghton, Silent & Campbell.

He was a member of the Union League Club, Palestine Lodge 351 of the F.&A.M. and the Scottish Rite Masons.

Haas died of a heart attack at age 66 in his Alhambra, California, home on February 17, 1936. A funeral service was held in the Scottish Rite Cathedral, 929 South Hope Street, Los Angeles, followed by cremation. Survivors were three brothers—John B. Haas, Gustave Haas and Charles E. Haas—and two sisters.

== Vocation ==
=== City attorney ===
Haas was elected Los Angeles city attorney on the Republican ticket for a two-year term in December 1898. As city attorney he gave his opinion on these consequential items of his time:

- In 1899 he forced a delay to the start of work on the Broadway Tunnel on the theory that the contractors should have been required to abide by terms of an eight-hour day that had just been ordered in new state legislation. He was, however, directed by a court to proceed with a contract without the provision being inserted into it.
- The same year, citing precedent back to an English decision in 1431, he held that Police Chief John M. Glass and his officers should obey the instructions of a sitting Police Commission, composed of Thomas Pascoe, Thomas Goss and Mayor Fred Eaton, whose members were "clothed with all the indicia and insignia of office" and never relinquished them rather than those of a rival commission, composed of L.G. Parker, W.B. Scarborough, R.A. Ling and A.C. Day, who were attempting to oust the old group. "This board has and retains the records pertaining to same, the Mayor continues to act as its chairman and his clerk as its secretary," he noted in a written opinion, and should be recognized until a decision as to its legitimacy, or lack thereof, was made by a proper court. The contretemps was eventually settled when members of the old board resigned.
- He held that the municipality had no authority to levy a tax against "wagons, buggies, bicycles and wheeled conveyances" in order to raise revenue for the purpose of hand-sweeping the downtown streets. He wrote: "There being neither a general statute nor charter provision conferring this power upon the Council of the city of Los Angeles, it can adopt no ordinance imposing a license tax upon property or upon individual acts, but only upon the conduct of a business."

In December–January 1899 – 1900 he made a trip to New York City to consult with John Forrest Dillon, "regarded as the highest authority on bonds in the United States," concerning recently passed Los Angeles bond issues that were to provide funds for schools and for improvement of the city water system. He returned with assurance that the two issues were legal and would pass scrutiny by the California Supreme Court.

Haas was later city attorney in Alhambra, California, and in Sierra Madre, California.

=== Private practice ===
After his term as Los Angeles city attorney, Haas went into partnership with Frank Garrett and then Harry L. Dunnigan. He was a recognized authority on water and riparian rights. The Los Angeles Times reported that Haas had "gained his State-wide reputation as a riparian and water rights lawyer at the turn of the century when he defended a case involving San Diego's water supply. The trial lasted 444 days—establishing a record for a case of this sort."

Haas was a member of a commission that proposed the idea of consolidating city and county governments into one jurisdiction. He and S.A. Butler presented the proposal directly to legislators in Sacramento in January 1907. In the same year he spoke against a separate idea that had been proposed in the Pomona, California, area – the division of Los Angeles County into two parts, with Pomona as the center of one of them.

He represented Forest Lawn during a proposal by residents south of Glendale, California, to incorporate as a city named Tropico.

=== Business ===
In business, he was president of the Fidelia Investment Company, vice-president of the C. J. Kubach Company, director of the German-American Bank and director of K&K Brick Company.

In 1908 Haas was a principal investor in a proposed Los Angeles and San Francisco Short Line Railroad Company, which aimed to build a rail line "eighty miles shorter than that now followed by the Southern Pacific" between the two cities.

Preceded by William Ellsworth Dunn	Los Angeles City Attorney; Walter F. Haas; 1898–1900	Succeeded by W.B. Matthews
