= Laurie D. Zelon =

American judge

Associate Justice of the California Court of Appeal, 2nd District, Division Seven
- In office 2003–Present

Laurie D. Zelon is an associate justice of the California's Court of Appeal, 2nd District, Division Seven. Zelon was appointed to the Los Angeles Superior Court in 2000, and she was elevated to the Court of Appeal in 2003. Zelon is a past President of the Los Angeles County Bar Association and has served on a variety of statewide judicial committees, including the California Commission on Access to Justice.

== Education ==
Zelon received her B.A. from Cornell University in 1974. She graduated from Harvard Law School in 1977, and was admitted to the California State Bar later that year. She was an associate, and then a partner at the Beardsley, Hufstedler & Kemble law firm and its successors from 1977 to 2000. While in private practice, she specialized in complex litigation involving scientific and technical issues, fiduciary obligations, and large-scale commercial disputes.

== Awards ==
An award for pro bono legal advocacy is named after Zelon — the Laurie D. Zelon Pro Bono Award of the Pro Bono Institute of Washington, D.C. — and she was the first recipient. Zelon has also received the William Reece Smith Jr. Special Services to Pro Bono Award, the Charles Dorsey Award from the National Legal Aid & Defenders Association, and Loren Miller Legal Services Award from the State Bar of California, and the Benjamin Aranda Access to Justice award.
