= Los Angeles County Bar Association =

Association of lawyers in Los Angeles

Los Angeles County Bar Association (LACBA)
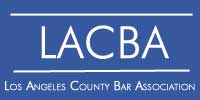
- Type: Nonprofit organization
- Founded: Los Angeles, CA 1878
- Headquarters: 444 South Flower Street, Ste 2500 Los Angeles, CA 90071
- Website: lacba.org

The Los Angeles County Bar Association (LACBA) is a voluntary bar association with more than 16,000 members throughout Los Angeles County, California, and the world. Founded in 1878, LACBA strives to meet the professional needs of lawyers and the legal community, advance the administration of justice, and provide the public with access to justice.

LACBA provides members with a range of benefits, including access to 25 sections based around practice areas, in-person and online networking and educational events, continuing legal education credits, legal news, committee service, and pro bono opportunities.

== Lawyer Referral Service ==
The Los Angeles County Bar Association Lawyer Referral Service (LRS), SmartLaw, was established in 1937, and was the first service of its kind in the United States. Members of the public use SmartLaw to find local lawyers by phone or online. Referred clients receive a limited, free consultation. SmartLaw also provides basic legal information to the public on hundreds of legal issues. In 2022, SmartLaw referred over 16,000 clients.

In 2016, the LRS began a "flat fee" program designed to deliver affordable legal services to members of the public. To support access to justice and to better serve the public, all participating attorneys are vetted for experience in respective practice areas, professional liability insurance, good standing, and other professional requirements. SmartLaw was originally certified by the State Bar of California to operate in Los Angeles County, Orange County, Riverside County, San Bernardino County, and Ventura County. As of May, 2025, SmartLaw is approved to expand services to an additional 47 counties across California.

== Los Angeles Lawyer Magazine and Other Publications ==
For over 40 years, LACBA's Los Angeles Lawyer magazine has published timely legal articles written by lawyers and for lawyers. LACBA members are emailed electronic issues of the magazine, which each contain leadership messages, practice tips, and opportunities to earn continuing legal education credits.

LACBA's Publications Department also makes the following services and publications available to its members:

- Free to members, LACBA's Daily eBriefs provide summaries of cases decided in the previous 24 hours by the U.S. Supreme Court, Ninth Circuit Court of Appeals, California Supreme Court, and California Court of Appeal. Link to the full case text are included.
- The Corporate Counsel's Guide to California Firms and Attorneys is published annually as a special edition to the magazine.
- Published annually since 1991, Southern California Directory of Experts & Consultants lists thousands of medical, technical, forensic, scientific, and legal experts.

== LACBA Counsel for Justice Projects ==
For more than 50 years, LACBA Counsel for Justice (CFJ). brought together law firms, foundations, corporations, donors and volunteers in an effort to provide equal access to legal services in the Los Angeles community. CFJ services and staff are supported by fundraising and cy pres awards.CFJ connects clients in need with pro bono and discounted legal work within its four key areas, listed below. As of 2025, LACBA identifies Counsel for Justice as a separate charity.

AIDS Legal Services Project provides a lifeline to dignity and fundamental rights, including representation for estate planning, housing, healthcare access, privacy, debt relief, and immigration.

Domestic Violence Legal Services Project offers access to the protections of the civil legal system by providing free legal information, forms preparation assistance, and referrals to victims of abuse in restraining order cases, including domestic violence and elder abuse.

Immigration Legal Assistance Project keeps families together and provides accurate information about immigration rights by providing immigration advice to citizens, immigrants, and aliens, and preparing immigration and naturalization forms.

Veterans Legal Services Project clears access barriers to veteran housing, employment, and financial stability by assisting with clearing traffic and criminal records, small business development, family law issues, military discharge upgrades, and advocating for low-income tenants.

=== 2022/23 CFJ Statistics ===
- 11,527 Clients helped
- 371 Volunteer attorneys, law students, paralegals, interpreters and mediators
- 5,941 Donated hours of pro bono legal services
- Value of $1,860,000+ provided in legal services

== Attorney-Client Mediation and Arbitration ==
Since 1979, the Los Angeles County Bar Association, through the Attorney-Client Mediation and Arbitration Services Committee (ACMAS), has provided mediation and arbitration services for fee disputes between attorneys and clients, and also between attorneys or law firms, pursuant to Business & Professions Code Section 6200 et seq. (Business and Professions Code Sections 6200–6206 were enacted for the purpose of providing an alternative forum to the courts in order to resolve disputes between clients and their attorneys over the matter of the amount of fees charged.) With its Law Practice Management (LPM) offering, ACMAS also administrates mediations that are unique to internal law firm disputes. In 2022, the program changed its rules to accommodate arbitrations and mediations that do not involve fee disputes between clients and attorneys. Regarding case volume, ACMAS is the largest program of its kind in the State of California and provides arbitration and mediation services to more than 1,000 people annually.

== Judicial Elections Evaluations ==
LACBA's Judicial Elections Evaluation Committee (JEEC) prepares evaluations of candidates in contested California Superior Court judicial elections in Los Angeles County. JEEC makes its evaluations by interviewing candidates and communicating with lawyers, judges, and others regarding the candidates, rates the candidates, and publishes the ratings of candidates prior to elections. Each judicial candidate who is evaluated by the committee is provided one of the following ratings: “Exceptionally Well Qualified,” “Well Qualified,” “Qualified”, or “Not Qualified.” The judicial candidate ratings are provided as a public service.

== Public Counsel ==
Founded in 1970, Public Counsel is the public interest law firm of the Los Angeles County and Beverly Hills Bar Associations, among others. Public Counsel is the largest pro bono law office in the U.S. Its principal role is matching volunteer private attorneys with indigent individuals who need legal services. Public Counsel partners with LACBA to achieve the shared goal of maximizing the availability of legal services to the poor in L.A. County. A pilot program in the California Court of Appeal, Second District operated between LACBA's Appellate Courts Committee and Public Counsel provides pro bono representation to indigent litigants who are without counsel.

== Affiliated Bar Associations ==
21 geographic and minority bar associations are affiliated with LACBA by maintaining a level of members in common. Some of the benefits of affiliation to a smaller bar are being connected with LACBA and thus brought to the awareness of its large membership, and having opportunities to participate in the leadership of LACBA through dedicated positions on its Board of Trustees.

== History ==
Written by attorney Kathleen Tuttle, the book Lawyers of Los Angeles:1950 to 2020 chronicles how the association and its members shaped laws and events locally, statewide, and nationally. Initially driven by a cohesive but insular group of "Spring Street Lawyers," LACBA eventually expanded to all attorneys while grappling with issues of inclusion, equality, and access to justice.

Lawyers of Los Angeles topics:

- The 1950s House Un-American Activities Committee investigations of the "Hollywood Ten."
- High-profile trials of Sirhan Sirhan, Charles Manson, and OJ Simpson.
- Local lawyers who were key to bringing the 1960 Democratic Convention and 1984 Olympics to Los Angeles
- LACBA's 1974 resolution to end discrimination at elite private clubs
- LACBA's impact on judicial independence
- Lawyer-leaders and their pivotal roles during periods of social unrest and political upheaval
- L.A. lawyers—especially women and lawyers of color—became U.S. attorneys in the Central District, federal judges, and received presidential appointments in the nation’s capital.
- LACBA's 1977 decision to support Public Counsel, still the country’s largest pro bono public interest law firm.

Several of LACBA's past presidents have become notable. Andrew Glassell founded the city of Orange, California, John Dustin Bicknell founded the California cities of Monrovia and Azusa, John D. Works was a U.S. Senator from California, Grant Cooper defended Sirhan Sirhan in his defense trial, and Warren Christopher served under United States President William Clinton as his Secretary of State. Another past president, Danette Meyers, ran for Los Angeles District Attorney in 2012.

A "Virtual Museum" that chronicles much of LACBA's early history and significance within Los Angeles' legal community. The museum has a listing of LACBA's past presidents, a biography of Clara Shortridge Foltz, and a chronicle of Los Angeles' legal history amongst other information.

Numerous dignitaries and officials have addressed LACBA over the years. For example, in a presentation to LACBA, on November 18, 1976, United States Attorney General Edward H. Levi, who had recently assumed leadership in the wake of the Watergate scandal, shared: "O]ne paramount concern must always guide our way. This is the keeping of the faith in the essential decency and even-handedness of the law, a faith which is the strength of the law and which must be continually renewed or else it is lost. In a society that too accepts the notion that everything can be manipulated, it is important to make clear that the administration of federal justice seeks to be impartial and fair..."

During LACBA's ceremony commemorating its 100th year in 1978, United States President Jimmy Carter gave a speech at a luncheon.

In November, 1987, LACBA filed a lawsuit in federal court against the State of California to challenge as unconstitutional a state rule limiting the number of judges that counties are allowed. LACBA argued that the state’s failure to establish necessary judgeships and to fill open positions caused delays and backlogs of civil case resolution, an access to justice issue.

On January 18, 2012, LACBA participated in a rally in downtown Los Angeles to support adequate California state court funding. Several local and state politicians spoke at the rally, which drew attention to cuts in California state court funding. One of the rally's featured speakers was former California Governor Gray Davis.

In January 2025, LACBA found itself in the midst of a public disaster, as fires decimated entire neighborhoods in the Los Angeles area. In response, LACBA led an effort to connect Los Angeles area lawyers with pro bono opportunities provided by local non-profits to assist those impacted by the fires, and created an online library on its website with information for lawyers and the public to help navigate through the disaster.

On March 10, 2025, LACBA's Executive Committee joined bar associations across the United States, including the American Bar Association, in condemning recent partisan attacks on the rule of law and reaffirmed the need to support the independence of the judiciary and legal profession, stating it condemns "all political attacks on our constitutionally mandated system of governance which is based on the rule of law, separation of powers and three co-equal and independent branches of government, regardless of who makes them," and "threats against and intimidation of judges, lawyers and law firms to attempt to influence any ruling, criticism, or opposition adverse to the proponent’s position", while also applauding "the conviction and courage of individuals who stand up for the rule of law at great personal and professional cost."

On April 7, 2025, LACBA joined together with other major metropolitan and affiliate bar associations to file an amicus brief, in support of Perkins Coie, in the law firm's lawsuit challenging an executive order issued against the firm.

== Notable Past Presidents of LACBA ==
- Andrew Glassell (1878–1880)
- John D. Bicknell (1890)
- Frank H. Howard (1891)
- Asm. R.H.F. Variel (1900)
- Lucien Shaw (1901–1902)
- John D. Works (1903)
- William J. Hunsaker (1904)
- Oscar A. Trippet (1911)
- Asm. E.W. Britt (1912)
- Sen. J.W. McKinley (1918)
- Henry W. O'Melveny (1919)
- Oscar Lawler, U.S. Attorney (1923)
- Loyd Wright (1937)
- Hon. William C. Mathes (1943)
- Paul Fussell (1947)
- Walter Nossaman (1948)
- Dana Latham (1950)
- Hon. William P. Gray (1956)
- Hon. E Avery Crary (1958)
- Hugh W. Darling (1959)
- Walter R. Ely (1962)
- Maynard J. Toll (1963)
- Glendon Tremaine (1966)
- Leonard S. Janofsky (1968)
- Seth M. Hufstedler (1969)
- G. William Shea (1973)
- Warren M. Christopher (1974)
- Francis M. Wheat (1975)
- Samuel L. Williams (1977)
- Gavin Miller (1983)
- Patricia D. Phillips (1984)
- Hon. Charles S. Vogel (1985)
- Larry R. Feldman (1987)
- Margaret M. Morrow (1988)
- Patrick M. Kelly (1990)
- Andrea Sheridan Ordin (1991)
- Laurie D. Zelon (1995)
- Sarvenaz Bahar (2025)
