= Escola v. Coca-Cola Bottling Co. =

1944 Supreme Court of California case

- Supreme Court of California

Decided July 5, 1944
- Full case name: Gladys Escola, Respondent, v. Coca Cola Bottling Company of Fresno (a Corporation), Appellant.
- Citation(s): 24 Cal.2d 453, 150 P.2d 436

Case history
- Prior history: Appeal from a judgment upon a jury verdict in favor of plaintiff in Merced County Superior Court, reversed on Aug. 3, 1943 by 140 P.2d 107 (Ct. App. 1st Dist. 1943), hearing granted (now-obsolete terminology for grant of discretionary review), Sept. 30, 1943.
- Subsequent history: none

Holding
- Judgment for plaintiff affirmed under res ipsa loquitur.

Court membership
- Chief Justice: Phil S. Gibson
- Associate Justices: John W. Shenk, Douglas L. Edmonds, Jesse W. Carter, Roger J. Traynor, B. Rey Schauer, Jesse W. Curtis

Case opinions
- Majority: Gibson, joined by Shenk, Curtis, Carter, Schauer
- Concurrence: Traynor
- Edmonds took no part in the consideration or decision of the case.

Escola v. Coca-Cola Bottling Co., 24 Cal.2d 453, 150 P.2d 436 (1944), was a decision of the Supreme Court of California involving an injury caused by an exploding bottle of Coca-Cola. It was an important case in the development of the common law of product liability in the United States, not so much for the actual majority opinion, but for the concurring opinion of California Supreme Court justice Roger Traynor.

== Background ==
Both the Court of Appeal and Supreme Court opinions recounted only the most important material facts.

Plaintiff Gladys Escola was a waitress in a restaurant. She was putting away glass bottles of Coca-Cola when one of the bottles spontaneously exploded in her hand. She suffered a deep five-inch cut, which severed the blood vessels, nerves, and muscles of the thumb and palm of the hand.

The top portion of the bottle, with the cap, remained in her hand, and the lower portion fell to the floor but did not break. The broken bottle was not produced at the trial, as the pieces had been thrown away by an employee of the restaurant shortly after the accident. Escola, however, described the broken pieces, and a diagram of the bottle was made showing the location of the "fracture line," where the bottle broke in two. One of Coca-Cola's delivery drivers was called as a witness by plaintiff, and he testified that he had seen other bottles of Coca-Cola in the past explode and had found broken bottles in the warehouse when he took the cases out but that he did not know what made them blow up.

A 2003 book provided more details recovered from the appellate briefs. The accident occurred on August 21, 1941, at approximately 6:00 p.m. in Tiny's Waffle Shop in Merced, California. Escola had begun to restock the restaurant refrigerator with bottles of Coca-Cola delivered two days earlier, when the fourth one suddenly exploded in her hand. After she recovered, she had permanent tenderness and pain at the scar site which left her partially incapacitated in her occupation as a waitress. She filed a workers' compensation claim with the Industrial Accident Commission but was granted only $42.60 in compensation, which did not cover her medical expenses or lost wages. That was when she decided to file a lawsuit and sued the company who had supplied the bottles, the Coca-Cola Bottling Company of Fresno.

Escola was represented at trial by legendary litigator Melvin Belli, then in the early stage of his career. He later acknowledged in his own autobiography that he did not then fully comprehend that her case would become a far-reaching landmark case. The jury returned a verdict for the plaintiff, following the doctrine of res ipsa loquitur. According to the 2003 book, the jury awarded monetary damages of $2,900 to Escola.

== Majority opinion ==
Chief Justice Phil S. Gibson affirmed the judgment of the lower court. He held that even though the instrument causing the injury was not under the exclusive control of the defendant at the time of the accident, the defendant had control at the time the alleged negligent act took place (the filling of the defective bottle).

Upon an examination of the record, the evidence appears sufficient to support a reasonable inference that the bottle here involved was not damaged by any extraneous force after delivery to the restaurant by defendant. It follows, therefore, that the bottle was in some manner defective at the time defendant relinquished control, because sound and properly prepared bottles of carbonated liquids do not ordinarily explode when carefully handled. [Escola, 24 Cal.2d at 459]

Furthermore, even though the defendant produced evidence to rebut the inference of negligence that arises upon application of the doctrine of res ipsa loquitur by discussing its safety testing procedures, Gibson ruled that the question was properly submitted to the jury and did not modify the jury's verdict.

== Concurring opinion ==
Justice Roger Traynor concurred in the judgment but argued that instead of deciding the case on grounds of negligence, a rule of strict liability should be imposed on manufacturers whose products cause injury to consumers. Basing his reasoning heavily on earlier cases (especially MacPherson v. Buick Motor Co.), Traynor argued that public policy demanded "that responsibility be fixed wherever it will most effectively reduce the hazards to life and health inherent in defective products that reach the market." He felt that manufacturers were better prepared to handle the costs of injury than individual consumers, and he noted that California state law already applied a rule of strict liability to makers of foodstuffs that cause illness or injury.

Traynor also felt that the majority's reasoning approached a rule of strict liability even though the decision was ostensibly based on the doctrine of res ipsa loquitur:

In leaving it to the jury to decide whether the inference has been dispelled, regardless of the evidence against it, the negligence rule approaches the rule of strict liability. It is needlessly circuitous to make negligence the basis of recovery and impose what is in reality liability without negligence. If public policy demands that a manufacturer of goods be responsible for their quality regardless of negligence there is no reason not to fix that responsibility openly. 24 Cal.2d at 463.

Traynor also wrote that the nature of the modern system of the mass production and distribution of goods made it difficult or impossible for consumers to inspect and verify that the products they were purchasing were safe or to demonstrate that the manufacturer had been negligent. That made strict liability a more practical standard.

== Legacy ==
Today, Escola is widely recognized as a landmark case in American law and is mandatory reading for first-year students in most American law schools. The reason is that in 1963, Traynor wrote a majority opinion, Greenman v. Yuba Power Products, 59 Cal. 2d 57 (1963), in which the Court at last adopted the rule he had suggested 19 years earlier. In Greenman, Traynor wrote: "We need not recanvass the reasons for imposing strict liability on the manufacturer. They have been fully articulated in the cases cited." Of course, among those cases was his own concurrence in Escola. Because Traynor incorporated by reference his own discussion in Escola, the two cases are usually assigned and discussed together.
