= Perez v. Sharp =

California Supreme Court civil rights case

- Supreme Court of California

Decided October 1, 1948
- Full case name: Andrea D. Perez and Sylvester S. Davis, Jr. v. A.W. Sharp, as County Clerk of the County of Los Angeles
- Citation(s): 32 Cal.2d 711, 198 P.2d 17

Case history
- Prior history: none (original proceeding for writ of mandate)

Holding
- Marriage is a fundamental right in a free society; the state may not restrict this right with respect to restrictions based upon the race of the parties.

Court membership
- Chief Justice: Phil S. Gibson
- Associate Justices: John W. Shenk, Douglas L. Edmonds, Jesse W. Carter, Roger J. Traynor, B. Rey Schauer, Homer R. Spence

Case opinions
- Plurality: Traynor, joined by Gibson, Carter
- Concurrence: Edmonds
- Concurrence: Carter
- Concur/dissent: Shenk, joined by Schauer, Spence

Laws applied
- U.S. Const. Amend. XIV cl. 1, and Cal. Civ. Code, §§ 60, 69, 69a

Perez v. Sharp, also known as Perez v. Lippold or Perez v. Moroney, is a 1948 case decided by the Supreme Court of California in which the court held by a 4–3 majority that the state's ban on interracial marriage violated the Fourteenth Amendment to the United States Constitution.

The three justice plurality decision was authored by Associate Justice Roger J. Traynor who would later serve as the Court's Chief Justice. Justice Douglas L. Edmonds wrote his own concurrence of the judgment, leading to a four-justice majority in favor of striking down the law. The dissent was written by Associate Justice John W. Shenk, the second longest-serving member in the Court's history and a notable judicial conservative. The opinion was the first of any state to permanently strike down an anti-miscegenation law in the United States.

== Background ==
Andrea Perez, a white woman, and Sylvester D. Davis Jr., a black man met while working in the defense industry in Los Angeles. Andrea Perez was Mexican American, but at the time, individuals of Mexican ancestry were normally classified as white because of their Spanish heritage. The county clerk, named W. G. Sharp, refused to issue the license based on California Civil Code, Section 60: "All marriages of white persons with Negroes, Mongolians, members of the Malay race, or mulattoes are illegal and void" and on Section 69, which stated that "no license may be issued authorizing the marriage of a white person with a Negro, mulatto, Mongolian or member of the Malay race". At the time, California's anti-miscegenation statute had banned interracial marriage since 1850, when it first enacted a statute prohibiting whites from marrying blacks or mulattoes.

Perez, represented by Atty. Daniel G. Marshall, petitioned the California Supreme Court for an original writ of mandate to compel the issuance of the license. Perez and Davis were both Catholics and wanted a Catholic marriage with a Mass. One of their primary arguments, adopted by Justice Douglas Edmonds in his concurring opinion, was that the Church was willing to marry them and so the state's anti-miscegenation law infringed on their right to participate fully in the sacraments of their religion, including the sacrament of matrimony.

== Court opinion ==
The court held that marriage is a fundamental right and that laws restricting that right must not be based solely on prejudice. The lead opinion by Justice Roger Traynor and joined by Chief Justice Phil Gibson and Justice Jesse Carter, held that restrictions due to discrimination violated the constitutional requirements of due process and equal protection of the laws. The court voided the California statute, holding that Section 69 of the California Civil Code was too vague and uncertain to be enforceable restrictions on the fundamental right of marriage and that they violated the Fourteenth Amendment by impairing the right to marry on the basis of race alone. In a separate concurring opinion, Justice Douglas Edmonds held that the statute violated the religious freedom of the plaintiffs since the anti-miscegenation law infringed on their right to participate fully in the sacrament of matrimony.

In a separate concurring opinion, Justice Carter wrote that the statutes under consideration were "the product of ignorance, prejudice and intolerance" that "never were constitutional" because when first enacted "they violated the supreme law of the land as found in the Declaration of Independence". With regard to "the desirability or undesirability of racial mixtures", he noted that the petitioner's brief included several quotations from Adolf Hitler's autobiographical manifesto Mein Kampf, and stated that "[t]o bring into issue the correctness of the writings of a madman, a rabble-rouser, a mass-murderer, would be to clothe his utterances with an undeserved aura of respectability and authoritativeness". Shenk's dissent, joined by B. Rey Schauer and Homer R. Spence, wrote that anti-miscegenation laws had a long history in common law and were legal when enacted, thus there was no basis for changing them. "It is difficult to see why such laws, valid when enacted and constitutionally enforceable in this state for nearly 100 years and elsewhere for a much longer period of time, are now unconstitutional under the same Constitution and with no change in the factual situation."

== Significance ==
By its decision in this case, involving a white woman and black man, the California Supreme Court became the first court of the 20th century to hold that a state anti-miscegenation law violates the US Constitution. It preceded Loving v. Virginia (1967)—the case, involving a black woman and white man, in which the US Supreme Court invalidated all such state statutes—by 19 years. Indeed, in Loving, Chief Justice Earl Warren cited Perez in footnote 5, and at least one scholar has discussed the extent to which Perez influenced his opinion. Perez was much of the basis for the California Supreme Court's 2008 decision, In re Marriage Cases (2008) 43 Cal. 4th 757, which declared that the California law restricting marriage to be between a man and a woman to be unconstitutional. The couple remained married until Andrea Perez Davis' death in 2000. Her husband, Sylvester D. Davis Jr., died in 2018 aged 95.

== See also ==
- Pace v. Alabama, a, 1883 case that upheld bans on interracial marriage, overturned by Loving v. Virginia
