= Concurring opinion =

Written opinion by one or more judges

In law, a concurring opinion is in certain legal systems a written opinion by one or more judges of a court which agrees with the decision made by the majority of the court, but states different (or additional) reasons as the basis for their decision. When no absolute majority of the court can agree on the basis for deciding the case, the decision of the court may be contained in a number of concurring opinions, and the concurring opinion joined by the greatest number of judges is referred to as the plurality opinion.

As a practical matter, concurring opinions are slightly less useful to lawyers than majority opinions. Having failed to receive a majority of the court's votes, concurring opinions are not binding precedent and cannot be cited as such. But concurring opinions can sometimes be cited as a form of persuasive precedent (assuming the point of law is one on which there is no binding precedent already in effect). The conflict in views between a majority opinion and a concurring opinion can assist a lawyer in understanding the points of law articulated in the majority opinion. Occasionally, a judge will use a concurring opinion to signal an openness to certain types of test cases that would facilitate the development of a new legal rule, and in turn, such a concurring opinion may become more famous than the majority opinion in the same case. A well-known example of this phenomenon is Escola v. Coca-Cola Bottling Co. (1944).

Concurring opinions may be held by courts but not expressed: in many legal systems the court "speaks with one voice" and thus any concurring or dissenting opinions are not reported. Some view concurring opinions as "unnecessary confusion" that "encourage litigation" and create "legal clutter."

== Types of concurring opinion ==
There are several kinds of concurring opinion. A simple concurring opinion arises when a judge joins the decision of the court but has something to add. Concurring in judgment means that the judge agrees with the majority decision (the case's ultimate outcome in terms of who wins and who loses) but not with the reasoning of the majority opinion (why one side wins and the other loses).

== Concurring opinions by region ==
In some courts, such as the Supreme Court of the United States, the majority opinion may be broken down into numbered or lettered parts, and then concurring justices may state that they join some parts of the majority opinion, but not others, for the reasons given in their concurring opinion. In other courts, such as the Supreme Court of California, the same justice may write a majority opinion and a separate concurring opinion to express additional reasons in support of the judgment (which are joined only by a minority).

In some jurisdictions (e.g., California), the term may be abbreviated in certain contexts to conc. opn.

== Terminology at the various courts ==
- At the International Court of Justice, the term "separate opinion" is used and judges can also add declarations to the judgment.
- The term concurring opinion is used at the Supreme Court of the United States.
- The European Court of Human Rights uses the term concurring opinion and calls both concurring and dissenting opinions separate opinions. Judges very rarely add declarations to the judgment.
- Historically, the Law Lords of the United Kingdom gave each an opinion of their own and no aggregated judgment was provided (i.e., seriatim). However, the new Supreme Court of the United Kingdom allows for such aggregated judgements, and it is theoretically possible for such concurring opinions to now arise.

== Notable concurring opinions ==
- Whitney v. California (1927): Justice Louis Brandeis, free speech, became precedent 50 years later in Brandenburg v. Ohio.
- Escola v. Coca-Cola Bottling Co. (1944): Justice Roger Traynor, strict liability for manufacturers, became precedent 19 years later in Greenman v. Yuba Power Products, Inc.
- Youngstown Sheet & Tube Co. v. Sawyer (1952): Justice Robert H. Jackson, definitive test for the limits of Presidential power.
- Katz v. United States (1967): Justice John Marshall Harlan II, formulated the "reasonable expectation of privacy" test for determining the reasonableness of a search.
