= 1983 reasons of the Supreme Court of Canada =

The list below consists of the reasons delivered from the bench by the Supreme Court of Canada during 1983. This list, however, does not include decisions on motions.

== Reasons ==
Delivered the Court's reason
Joined the Court's reason
Filed a concurrence
Joined a concurrence
Filed a dissent
Joined a dissent
Filed a concurrence/dissent
Joined a concurrence/dissent
Did not participate in the judgment
Did not participate in the final disposition of the judgment
Not a member of the Court at the time of hearing or delivering
- Decisions that do not note a Justice delivering the Court's reason are per coram.
- Multiple concurrences and dissents within a case are numbered, with joining votes numbered accordingly. Justices occasionally join multiple reasons in a single case; each vote is subdivided accordingly.
- Multiple unnumbered reasons are jointly written or delivered.
- Decisions that are given orally from the bench are denoted by a "V"; per coram decisions delivered orally from the bench only note a "V" on the most senior justice on the panel.
- An asterisk ( * ) in the Court's opinion denotes that it was only a majority in part or a plurality.

Case name	Argued	Decided	Laskin	Ritchie	Dickson	Beetz	Estey	McIntyre	Chouinard	Lamer	Wilson (Note: appointed on 4 March 1982)
Westendorp v the Queen, 1983 CanLII 1, [1983] 1 SCR 43	2 December 1982	25 January 1983									
Abrahams v Attorney General of Canada, 1983 CanLII 17, [1983] 1 SCR 2	2 June 1982	25 January 1983									
Nowegijick v The Queen, 1983 CanLII 18, [1983] 1 SCR 29	10 June 1982	25 January 1983									
Zayack v Attorney General of Canada, 1983 CanLII 135, [1983] 1 SCR 12	2 June 1982	25 January 1983									
Costello and Dickhoff v City of Calgary, 1983 CanLII 137, [1983] 1 SCR 14	12 May 1982	25 January 1983									
Attorney General of Nova Scotia v Burke, 1983 CanLII 140, [1983] 1 SCR 55	31 January 1983	1 February 1983		V							
GM (Canada) v Naken, 1983 CanLII 19, [1983] 1 SCR 72	25 March 1982	8 February 1983									
Thorne's Hardware Ltd v The Queen, 1983 CanLII 20, [1983] 1 SCR 106	19 May 1982	8 February 1983									
The Queen (Can) v Saskatchewan Wheat Pool, 1983 CanLII 21, [1983] 1 SCR 205	17 February 1982	8 February 1983									
Regional Assessment Commissioner v Caisse Populaire de Hearst, 1983 CanLII 45, [1983] 1 SCR 57	29 March 1982	8 February 1983									
Fort Frances v Boise Cascade Canada Ltd, 1983 CanLII 47, [1983] 1 SCR 171	13–14 December 1982	8 February 1983									
Miller v Ameri-Cana Motel Ltd, 1983 CanLII 48, [1983] 1 SCR 229	2–3 June 1982	8 February 1983									
R v Farrant, 1983 CanLII 118, [1983] 1 SCR 124	29 April 1982	8 February 1983									
Canada Labour Relations Board et al v Paul L’Anglais Inc et al, 1983 CanLII 121, [1983] 1 SCR 147	25–26 October 1982	8 February 1983									
Cooper v The Queen, 1983 CanLII 124, [1983] 1 SCR 240	8 February 1983	8 February 1983	V								
Case name	Argued	Decided	Laskin	Ritchie	Dickson	Beetz	Estey	McIntyre	Chouinard	Lamer	Wilson
Stevenson v The Queen, 1983 CanLII 126, [1983] 1 SCR 241	9 February 1983	9 February 1983	V								
St-David de Falardeau (Corporation municipale de) et al v Munger, 1983 CanLII 129, [1983] 1 SCR 243	10 February 1983	10 February 1983			V						
Titus v R, 1983 CanLII 49, [1983] 1 SCR 259	14 October 1982	1 March 1983									
Canada Labour Relations Board v Halifax Longshoremen’s Association, Local 269, 1983 CanLII 133, [1983] 1 SCR 245	1 February 1983	1 March 1983									
R v Faid, 1983 CanLII 136, [1983] 1 SCR 265	4 May 1982	1 March 1983									
Zavarovalna Skupnost, (Insurance Community Triglav Ltd) v Terrasses Jewellers Inc, 1983 CanLII 138, [1983] 1 SCR 283	14–15 December 1982	1 March 1983									
CBC and co v R, 1983 CanLII 50, [1983] 1 SCR 339	31 March 1982	24 March 1983									
R v Terrence, 1983 CanLII 51, [1983] 1 SCR 357	22 March 1982	24 March 1983									
Shalansky et al v Board of Governors of Regina Pasqua Hospital, 1983 CanLII 117, [1983] 1 SCR 303	2 March 1983	24 March 1983									
R v Turgeon, 1983 CanLII 119, [1983] 1 SCR 308	19 October 1982	24 March 1983									
Roberge v The Queen, 1983 CanLII 120, [1983] 1 SCR 312	10 May 1982	24 March 1983									
Attorney General of Canada v Silk, 1983 CanLII 122, [1983] 1 SCR 335	16–17 June 1982	24 March 1983									
Martin v Chapman, 1983 CanLII 123, [1983] 1 SCR 365	20 May 1982	24 March 1983									
Abel Skiver Farm Corp v Town of Sainte-Foy, 1983 CanLII 22, [1983] 1 SCR 403	21 October 1981	26 April 1983									
Cement LaFarge v BC Lightweight Aggregate, 1983 CanLII 23, [1983] 1 SCR 452	29–30 November 1982	26 April 1983									
Case name	Argued	Decided	Laskin	Ritchie	Dickson	Beetz	Estey	McIntyre	Chouinard	Lamer	Wilson
Warehousemen and Helpers Union, Local 979 v Brink's Canada, 1983 CanLII 125, [1983] 1 SCR 382	14 March 1983	26 April 1983									
R v Konkin, 1983 CanLII 127, [1983] 1 SCR 388	1 December 1982	26 April 1983									
R v Buchinsky, 1983 CanLII 128, [1983] 1 SCR 481	10 May 1982	26 April 1983									
R v Roche, 1983 CanLII 130, [1983] 1 SCR 491	17 November 1982	26 April 1983									
Zodiak International v Polish People's Republic, 1983 CanLII 24, [1983] 1 SCR 529	28 February 1983	17 May 1983									
Citadel Assurance v Johns-Manville Canada, 1983 CanLII 52, [1983] 1 SCR 513	16 November 1982	17 May 1983									
Palachik v Kiss, 1983 CanLII 53, [1983] 1 SCR 623	17 June 1982	17 May 1983									
Attorney General of Canada v St Hubert Base Teachers’ Association, 1983 CanLII 131, [1983] 1 SCR 498	31 March 1983	17 May 1983									
Smith v The Queen, 1983 CanLII 134, [1983] 1 SCR 554	22–23 February 1982	17 May 1983									
Evans v Public Service Commission Appeal Board, 1983 CanLII 141, [1983] 1 SCR 582	4 November 1982	17 May 1983									
Engineered Homes Ltd v Mason et al, 1983 CanLII 142, [1983] 1 SCR 641	30 November 1982	17 May 1983									
Zidle v Canadian Imperial Bank of Commerce et al, 1983 CanLII 143, [1983] 1 SCR 654	3–4 May 1983	17 May 1983									
Canadian Imperial Bank of Commerce v Riddell Stead & Co et al, 1983 CanLII 144, [1983] 1 SCR 656	3–4 May 1983	17 May 1983									
R v Moore, 1983 CanLII 145, [1983] 1 SCR 658	17 May 1983	17 May 1983	V								
Williams and Glyn’s Bank Ltd v Belkin Packaging Ltd, 1983 CanLII	28 January 1982	17 May 1983									
Case name	Argued	Decided	Laskin	Ritchie	Dickson	Beetz	Estey	McIntyre	Chouinard	Lamer	Wilson
Corpex (1977) Inc v The Queen in right of Canada, 1983 CanLII 169, [1982] 2 SCR 674	2 May 1983	17 May 1983									
Paonessa and Paquette v R, 1983 CanLII 3477, [1983] 1 SCR 660	19 May 1983	19 May 1983		V							
Re Regina and Fleming, 1983 CanLII 3614, 1983 CanLII 3614 (Note: "Motion granted." For eventual disposition of case: Fleming (Gombosh Estate) v. The Queen, 1986 CanLII 63, [1986] 1 SCR 415 (24 April 1986))	6 June 1983	6 June 1983									
Novic v Novic, 1983 CanLII 55, [1983] 1 SCR 696	19 May 1983	7 June 1983									
Adam v Daniel Roy Ltée, 1983 CanLII 147, [1983] 1 SCR 683	16 March 1983	7 June 1983									
McEvoy v Attorney General for New Brunswick et al, 1983 CanLII 149, [1983] 1 SCR 704	8 February 1983	7 June 1983									
R v Jacques, 1983 CanLII 150, [1983] 1 SCR 724	7 June 1983	7 June 1983			V						
R v Covin, 1983 CanLII 151, [1983] 1 SCR 725	8 June 1983	8 June 1983									
Fruitman v Scott, 1983 CanLII 56, [1983] 1 SCR 732	15 June 1983	15 June 1983	V								
Northern Telecom v Communication Workers, 1983 CanLII 25, [1983] 1 SCR 733	8–9 June 1982	23 June 1983									
A S G Industries Inc v Corporation Superseal, 1983 CanLII 152, [1983] 1 SCR 781	17 March 1983	23 June 1983									
Lilly v The Queen, 1983 CanLII 153, [1983] 1 SCR 794	15–16 December 1982	23 June 1983									
Gray v Cotic, 1983 CanLII 57, [1983] 2 SCR 2	18 May 1983	27 September 1983									
Ontario Nurses' Association v Haldimand-Norfolk Health Unit, 1983 CanLII 58, [1983] 2 SCR 6	31 May 1982	27 September 1983									
Leblanc et al v Curbera, 1983 CanLII 154, [1983] 2 SCR 28	7 June 1983	27 September 1983									
Case name	Argued	Decided	Laskin	Ritchie	Dickson	Beetz	Estey	McIntyre	Chouinard	Lamer	Wilson
Co-Operative Fire & Casualty Co v Ritchie et al, 1983 CanLII 155, [1983] 2 SCR 36	2 February 1983	27 September 1983									
Century Insurance Co of Canada et al v Case Existological Laboratories Ltd, 1983 CanLII 156, [1983] 2 SCR 47	2–3 February 1983	27 September 1983									
Carleton v The Queen, 1983 CanLII 157, [1983] 2 SCR 58	27 September 1983	27 September 1983			V						
Topey v The Queen, 1983 CanLII 158, [1983] 2 SCR 59	12 October 1983	12 October 1983			V						
Bisaillon v Keable, 1983 CanLII 26, [1983] 2 SCR 60	3–4 March 1983	13 October 1983									
Racine v Woods, 1983 CanLII 27, [1983] 2 SCR 173	23–24 June 1983	13 October 1983									
Morris v The Queen, 1983 CanLII 28, [1983] 2 SCR 190	2 November 1982	13 October 1983									
R v Wetmore, 1983 CanLII 29, [1983] 2 SCR 284	28 September 1982	13 October 1983									
AG (Can) v Can Nat Transportation, Ltd, 1983 CanLII 36, [1983] 2 SCR 206	23–24 September 1982	13 October 1983			1	2				2	
Dowson v R, 1983 CanLII 59, [1983] 2 SCR 144	9 June 1983	13 October 1983									
Buchbinder v R, 1983 CanLII 60, [1983] 2 SCR 159	9 June 1983	13 October 1983									
Lyons et al v The Queen, 1983 CanLII 132, [1984] 2 SCR 631	4 October 1983	13 October 1983									
Vignola v Keable, 1983 CanLII 159, [1983] 2 SCR 112	3–4 March 1983	13 October 1983									
R v Commisso, 1983 CanLII 160, [1983] 2 SCR 121	18 November 1982	13 October 1983									
Phillips and Phillips v The Queen, 1983 CanLII 161, [1983] 2 SCR 161	3 February 1983	13 October 1983									
Canadian Union of Public Employees v Labour Relations Board (NS) et al, 1983 CanLII 162, [1983] 2 SCR 311	4–5 May 1983	13 October 1983									
Case name	Argued	Decided	Laskin	Ritchie	Dickson	Beetz	Estey	McIntyre	Chouinard	Lamer	Wilson
Sadjade v The Queen, 1983 CanLII 163, [1983] 2 SCR 361	19 October 1983	19 October 1983	V								
Mérineau v The Queen, 1983 CanLII 164, [1983] 2 SCR 362	20 October 1983	20 October 1983				V					
Baxter Travenol Laboratories v Cutter (Canada), 1983 CanLII 30, [1983] 2 SCR 388	8 June 1983	3 November 1983									
Messier v Delage, 1983 CanLII 31, [1983] 2 SCR 401	16 March 1983	3 November 1983									
Ogg-Moss v The Queen, 1983 CanLII 139, [1984] 2 SCR 171	3 November 1983	3 November 1983		V							
Attorney General of Quebec v Grondin, 1983 CanLII 165, [1983] 2 SCR 364	16 June 1983	3 November 1983									
The Queen v Savage, 1983 CanLII 32, [1983] 2 SCR 428	21–22 June 1983	24 November 1983									
R v Giguere, 1983 CanLII 61, [1983] 2 SCR 448	28 April 1983	24 November 1983									
Bell v The Queen, 1983 CanLII 166, [1983] 2 SCR 471	2 February 1983	24 November 1983									
Morguard Properties Ltd v City of Winnipeg, 1983 CanLII 33, [1983] 2 SCR 493	18 October 1983	15 December 1983									
R v Eldorado Nuclear Ltd; R v Uranium Canada Ltd, 1983 CanLII 34, [1983] 2 SCR 551	27 January 1983	15 December 1983									
Wilson v The Queen, 1983 CanLII 35, [1983] 2 SCR 594	14 March 1983	15 December 1983									
Novic v Novic, 1983 CanLII 148, [1983] 1 SCR 700	6 December 1983	15 December 1983									
Northern Pipeline Agency v Perehinec, 1983 CanLII 167, [1983] 2 SCR 513	5 May 1982	15 December 1983									
Paul Revere Life Insurance Co v Sucharov, 1983 CanLII 168, [1983] 2 SCR 541	13 October 1983	15 December 1983									
