= Frederick Houser =

Frederick Houser may refer to:

- Frederick F. Houser (1905–1989), Lieutenant Governor of California, 1943–1947
- Frederick W. Houser (1871–1942), his father, judge in California
