= Thomas J. Lennon =

American judge (1866–1926)

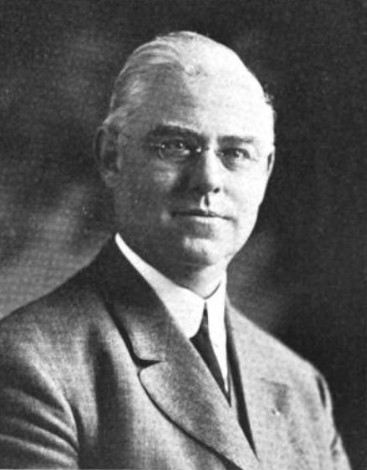

Associate Justice of the California Supreme Court
- In office December 20, 1918 – August 14, 1926
- Appointed by: Direct election
- Preceded by: William G. Lorigan
- Succeeded by: Frank G. Finlayson

Presiding Justice of the California Court of Appeal, First District
- In office 1910 – December 20, 1918
- Appointed by: Direct election
- Preceded by: James A. Cooper
- Succeeded by: William H. Waste

Personal details
- Born: Thomas Joseph Lennon; February 25, 1866 Marysville, Yuba County, California, U.S.
- Died: August 14, 1926 (aged 60) San Francisco, California, U.S.
- Spouse: Emily L. Lenhart (m. 1893)
- Children: 1
- Education: St. Mary's College (BS)

Thomas Joseph Lennon (February 25, 1866 – August 14, 1926) was an associate justice of the Supreme Court of California from December 20, 1918, to August 14, 1926.

== Biography ==
Lennon was born at Marysville, California, on February 25, 1866, and educated in the public schools. During high school, he studied at the Sacramento Institute, where at commencement in June 1881 he presented a speech on "right of free discussion." He then enrolled at St. Mary's College in San Francisco and in 1885 graduated with a B.S. degree. He joined the National Guard and in 1887 was promoted from corporal to second lieutenant, before becoming a captain by 1890.

He read law and on January 12, 1888, was admitted to the California bar. He was active in Republican Party politics and civic groups. In 1891, he was president of the Young Man's Institute, a charity. In 1898, he sought the position of Police Judge in San Francisco. He moved to San Rafael, California, in Mill Valley, and in 1902 was elected judge of the Marin County Superior Court on the Republican ticket, filling the vacancy left by Frank M. Angellotti's elevation to the California Supreme Court. In 1910, Lennon won election as Presiding Justice of the District Court of Appeal for the First District.

In February 1918, Lennon announced his candidacy for the California Supreme Court. During the campaign, he presented a proposal to streamline court cases, and was endorsed by Republican Senator Hiram Johnson. In 1919, he was elected over incumbent William G. Lorigan as an associate justice of the Supreme Court, along with Curtis D. Wilbur who won re-election. In December 1918, Governor William Stephens appointed William H. Waste to Lennon's vacant seat as Presiding Justice of the Court of Appeals, First District. Lennon remained in office until his death on August 14, 1926. Prior to his death, he had announced his candidacy for Chief Justice in the November 1926 election against William H. Waste, and Lennon's name appeared on the ballot but in effect Waste ran unopposed. After Lennon's death, in October 1926 Governor Friend Richardson named Frank G. Finlayson to fill Lennon's unexpired term, though Finlayson lost in the November election a month later to John W. Preston.

== Personal life ==
In 1893, he married Emily L. Lenhart. They had a son, Thomas Lloyd Lennon, who became an attorney.

== See also ==
- List of justices of the Supreme Court of California

Legal offices
Preceded by William G. Lorigan	Associate Justice of the California Supreme Court; 1918 – 1926	Succeeded by Frank G. Finlayson
Preceded by James A. Cooper	Presiding Justice of the California Court of Appeal, First District; 1910 – 1918	Succeeded by William H. Waste
