= Frederick W. Houser =

American judge

Frederick Wilhelm Houser
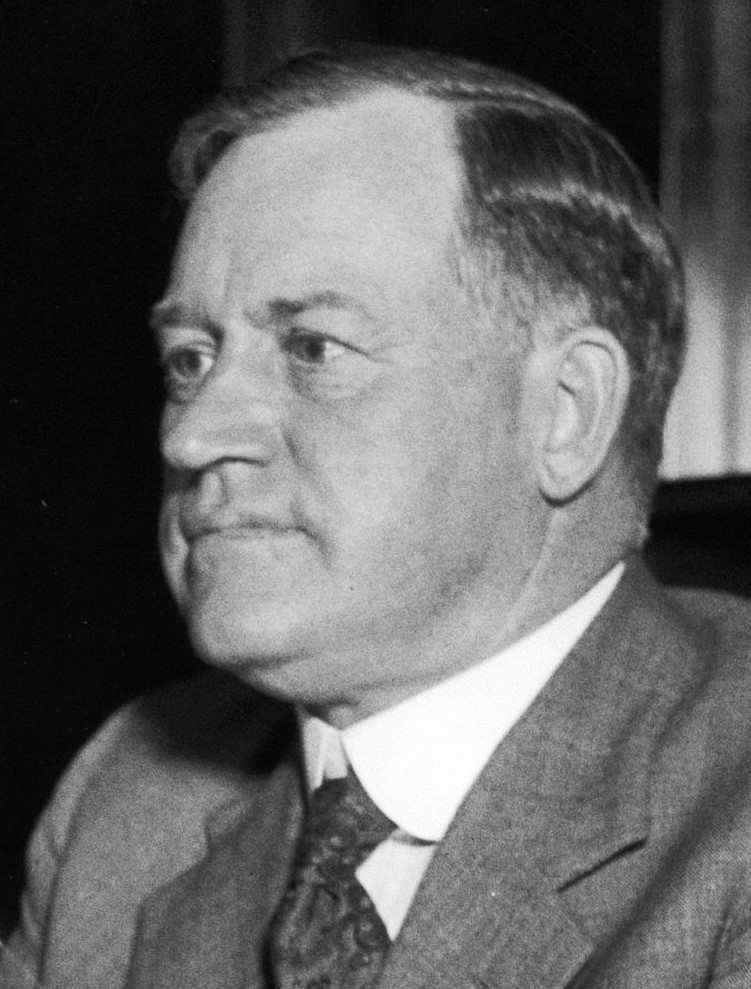
- Houser in the 1920s–30s

Associate Justice of the Supreme Court of California
- In office October 1, 1937 – October 12, 1942
- Appointed by: Governor Frank Merriam
- Preceded by: Ira F. Thompson
- Succeeded by: B. Rey Schauer

Presiding Justice of the California Court of Appeal, Second Appellate District, Division One
- In office 1935 – September 30, 1937
- Preceded by: Nathaniel Parrish Conrey
- Succeeded by: John M. York

Member of the California State Assembly from the 74th district
- In office January 2, 1903 - January 7, 1907
- Preceded by: Cornelius W. Pendleton
- Succeeded by: Robson O. Bell

Personal details
- Born: April 15, 1871 Jones County, Iowa, U.S.
- Died: October 12, 1942 (aged 71) Los Angeles, California, U.S.
- Spouse: Sara Wilde (m. 1902)
- Children: Frederick F. Houser; Rodman Wilde Houser
- Education: University of Southern California (LL.B.)

Frederick Wilhelm Houser (April 15, 1871 – October 12, 1942) was an American attorney who served as an associate justice of the California Supreme Court from October 1, 1937, to October 12, 1942.

== Biography ==
Houser was born to Justus Christian Houser and Martha Rodman in Jones County, Iowa. He moved to Los Angeles to read law in the offices of Stephen M. White. Houser continued his studies as one of the founding signatures to the University of Southern California Law School, and graduated in the first class of 1900.

In November 1902, Houser was nominated by the Republican Party and was elected an Assemblyman from the 74th district in the California State Assembly.

In November 1906, Houser ran as a Republican and was elected as a Judge in the Los Angeles County Superior Court. In 1911, the Los Angeles trial bench included future Supreme Court justices Frank G. Finlayson, Nathaniel P. Conrey, and Curtis D. Wilbur. In 1912, he was re-elected to a six-year term on the trial bench. In 1916, he was presiding judge of the Superior Court. In 1918, he won another election for a new term on the Superior Court.

In 1923, he became an Associate Justice in the California Court of Appeal, Second District, Division One. He held his seat until 1935 when he was named the Presiding Justice of that Court.

In November 1926, he ran unsuccessfully for the California Supreme Court, losing to Jesse W. Curtis Sr. and William Langdon. From 1935, Houser served as a member of the California Judicial Council.

In 1937, Governor Frank Merriman appointed Houser an associate justice of the California Supreme Court. In November 1938, he was retained in the election. He remained on the high court until his death on October 12, 1942. In December 1942, Governor Culbert Olson appointed B. Rey Schauer to the remainder of Houser's term.

== Personal life ==
At USC, he met his wife, Sara Isabel Wilde, who was also a founding signature for the school. They had two children, Frederick F. Houser, who became Lt. Governor of California and a judge, and Rodman Wilde Houser.

== See also ==
- List of justices of the Supreme Court of California

== Notes ==
Political offices
Preceded by Ira F. Thompson	Associate Justice of the California Supreme Court; 1937–1942	Succeeded by B. Rey Schauer
Preceded by Nathaniel Parrish Conrey	Presiding Justice of the California Court of Appeal, Second District, Division One; 1935–1937	Succeeded by John M. York
Preceded by Cornelius W. Pendleton	Assemblyman from the 74th district in the California State Assembly; January 2, 1903–January 7, 1907	Succeeded by Robson O. Bell
