= Nathaniel P. Conrey =

American judge (1860–1936)

Nathaniel Parrish Conrey
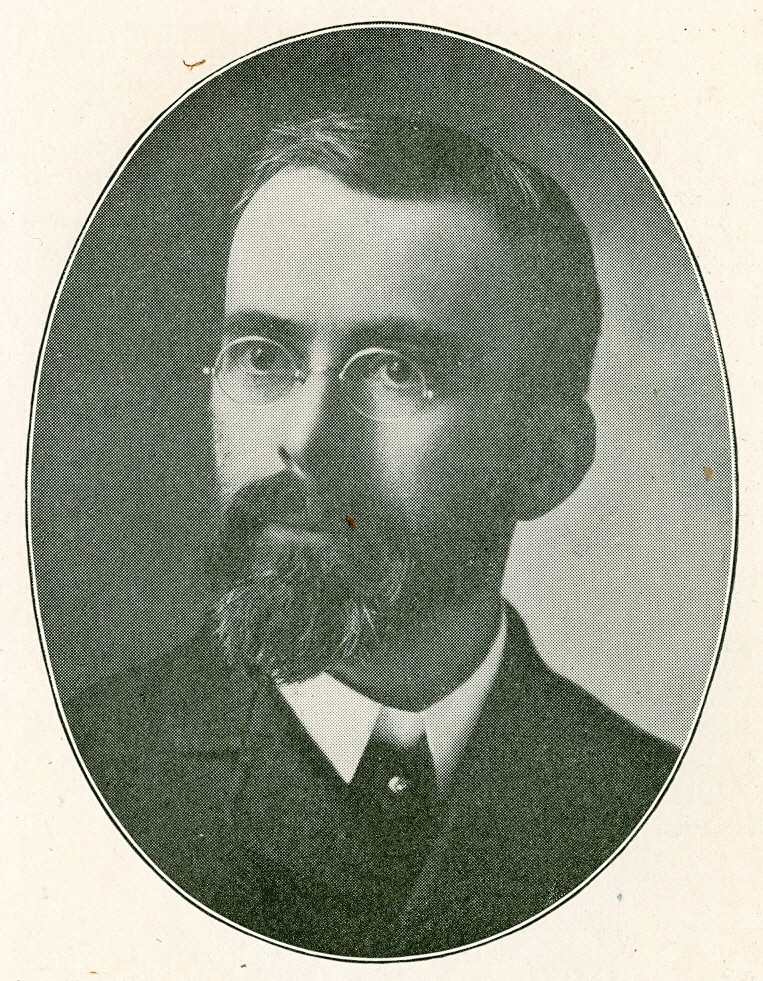

Associate Justice of the Supreme Court of California
- In office October 1, 1935 – November 2, 1936
- Appointed by: Governor Frank Merriam
- Preceded by: John W. Preston
- Succeeded by: Douglas L. Edmonds

Presiding Justice of the California Court of Appeal, Second Appellate District, Division One
- In office October 26, 1913 – September 30, 1935
- Appointed by: Governor Hiram Johnson
- Preceded by: Matthew Thompson Allen
- Succeeded by: Frederick W. Houser

Member of the California State Assembly from the 75th district
- In office January 2, 1899 – January 1, 1901
- Preceded by: John Cross
- Succeeded by: Henry E. Carter

Personal details
- Born: June 30, 1860 Mt. Carmel, Franklin County, Indiana, U.S.
- Died: November 2, 1936 (aged 76) Los Angeles, California, U.S.
- Party: Republican
- Spouse: Ethelwyn Wells (m. 1890)
- Education: Indiana Asbury University (BA); DePauw University (MA); University of Michigan School of Law (LLB)

Nathaniel Parrish Conrey (June 30, 1860 – November 2, 1936) was an associate justice of the Supreme Court of California from October 1, 1935, to November 2, 1936. His 36 years on the bench place him among the longest serving judges in California history.

== Biography ==
Conrey was born June 30, 1860, in Franklin County, Indiana to David La Rue and Hannah Jameson. He was raised in Shelbyville, Indiana, and educated in the public schools. He studied at Indiana Asbury University, receiving an A.B. degree in 1881 and a M.A. in 1884 from DePauw University. He continued his graduate education at the University of Michigan School of Law, graduating in 1883 with a LL.B.

In 1884, Conrey moved to California, was admitted to the bar, and entered private practice. From 1886 to 1887, he served as Pasadena City Attorney. He served on the Los Angeles City Board of Education from 1897 to 1898. He was elected as a Republican to the California State Assembly from the 75th district, serving in 1899 to 1900. In 1896, he was on the faculty at the University of Southern California as a professor of medical jurisprudence. In 1899, he was re-appointed as a trustee of the Los Angeles Normal School (which after 1919 was renamed the University of California, Los Angeles).

In 1900, Governor Henry Gage appointed Conrey as a judge of the Los Angeles County Superior Court. He was elected in 1902, 1908, and again in 1910, serving three terms. On October 26, 1913, Governor Hiram Johnson appointed Conrey as Presiding Justice of the California Court of Appeal, Second District, Division One, to fill the vacancy caused by the death of Matthew T. Allen. In 1914, Conrey successfully ran for re-election.

Governor Frank Merriam appointed Conrey, at age 75, as an associate justice of the Supreme Court of California, which position he held from October 1, 1935, to November 2, 1936.

On August 6, 1936, Conrey announced that he would resign from the supreme court, and would not stand for election that November. On September 14, Governor Frank Merriam selected Douglas L. Edmonds to stand in Conrey's place on the November ballot, and, two days later, he was seated as an associate justice pro tempore on the court. Conrey, who concluded his active service on the court in August, intended to officially resign once Edmonds was elected, but he died on November 2, the day before the election, from complications of the spinal cord injury that had prompted his resignation.

== Personal life ==
On November 21, 1890, he married Ethelwyn Wells in Los Angeles. They had a son and two daughters: David W. Conrey, Olive Ethelwyn Conrey (Lindsey), and Maryline Conrey.

== See also ==
- List of justices of the Supreme Court of California

Political offices
Preceded by John W. Preston	Associate Justice of the California Supreme Court; 1935–1936	Succeeded by Douglas L. Edmonds
Preceded by Matthew T. Allen	Presiding Justice of the California Court of Appeal, Second Appellate District, Division One; 1913–1935	Succeeded by Frederick W. Houser
