= Ira F. Thompson =

American judge (1885–1937)

Ira Francis Thompson
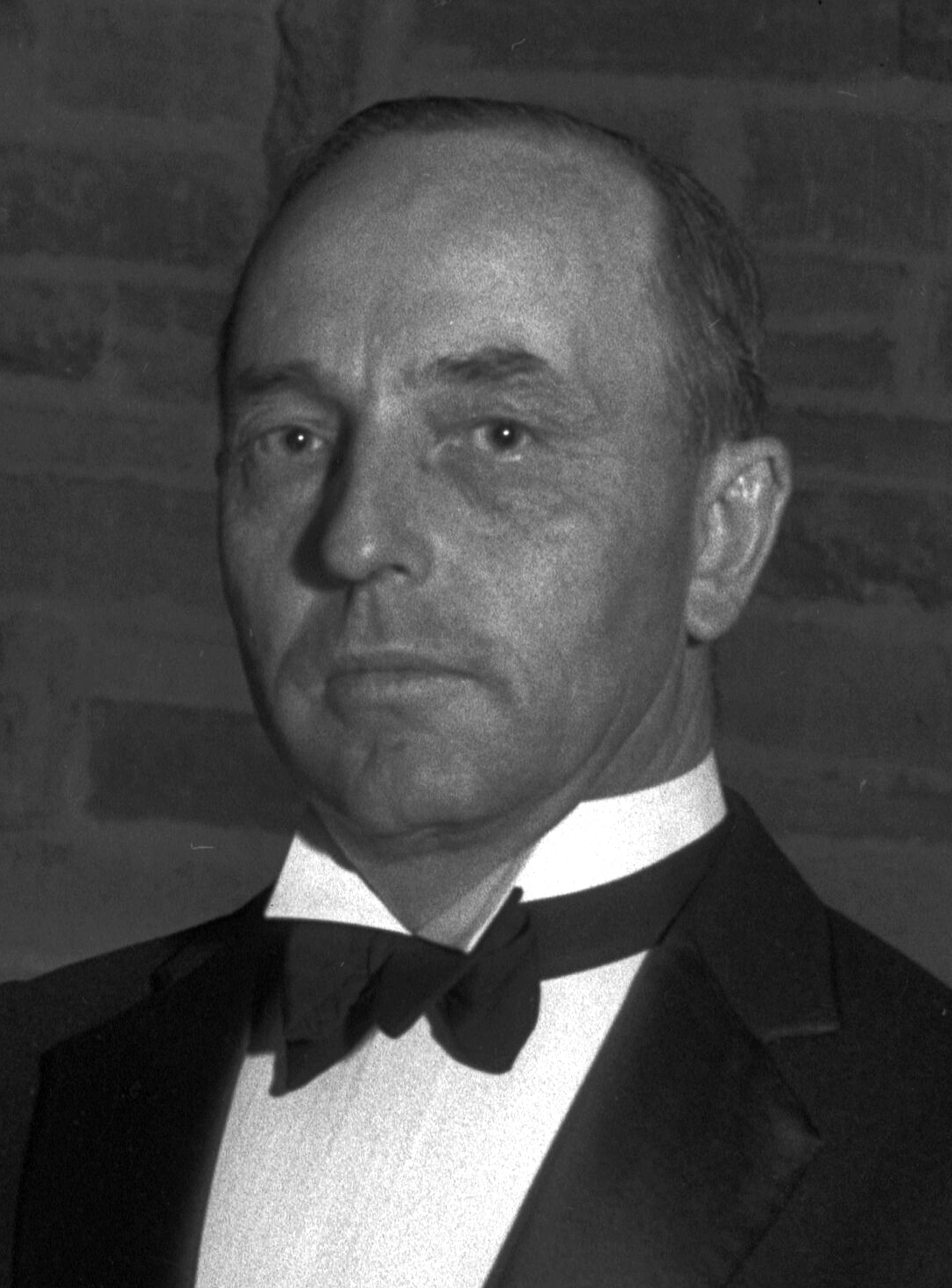
- Thompson in 1933

Associate Justice of the Supreme Court of California
- In office December 31, 1932 – August 4, 1937
- Appointed by: Governor James Rolph Jr.
- Preceded by: John E. Richards
- Succeeded by: Frederick W. Houser

Associate Justice of the California Court of Appeal, Second District, Division Two
- In office October 5, 1926 – December 30, 1932
- Appointed by: Governor Friend Richardson
- Succeeded by: Albert Lee Stephens Sr.

Personal details
- Born: June 20, 1885 Crawford County, Wisconsin, U.S.
- Died: August 4, 1937 (aged 52) Berkeley, California, U.S.
- Spouse: Cora Hilda Manning (m. 1910)
- Education: University of California, Berkeley (A.B., LL.B.)

Ira Francis Thompson (June 20, 1885 – August 4, 1937) was an associate justice of the Supreme Court of California from December 31, 1932, to August 4, 1937.

== Early years ==
Born on a farm in Crawford County, Wisconsin, to Josiah Thompson and Zylphia Alderman Thompson lost his father and mother when he was a child. At the age of 15, he moved to Eureka, California to begin high school, from which he graduated in 1904. After school, he worked part-time running errands at his half brother's (James Franklin Thompson's) newspaper, the Humboldt Standard.

Thompson completed a BA and an LLB (1909) at the University of California, Berkeley, where he paid his own school fees and finished a six-year law curriculum in four years. On July 2, 1909, he was admitted to the State Bar of California.

== Career ==
Thompson worked for a year following graduation in Oakland at Reed, Black & Reed. Then moved to Los Angeles and practiced with John F. Manning at Manning, Thompson & Hoover. Thompson immersed himself in civic causes and Republican Party politics.

Thompson was unsuccessful in his November 1920 Republican ticket bid for judge of the Los Angeles County Superior Court. During the campaign, he gave a speech to the Sons of America opposing citizenship for Japanese immigrants. In 1923, Governor Friend Richardson appointed him a judge of the Los Angeles County Superior Court.

In October 1926, Governor Friend Richardson elevated Thompson to the position of Associate Justice of the Court of Appeal, Second District. He was re-elected to this office. In Summer 1928, he lectured on ethics at the University of Southern California.

On December 8, 1932, Governor James Rolph Jr. appointed Thompson to the California Supreme Court to fill the vacant seat following the death of John E. Richards. Thompson began his term on December 31, 1932, and the term expired January 1, 1935. To fill Thompson's seat on the Court of Appeal, Governor Rolph appointed Judge Albert Lee Stephens Sr. of the Los Angeles Superior Court to the position. Thompson was successful in his bid on the Republican ticket for his November 1934 re-election to a 12-year term.

== Death ==
Thompson would die while in office on August 4, 1937. Rolph appointment Frederick W. Houser to the Supreme Court.

== Personal life ==
While at UC Berkeley, he met his future wife, Cora Hilda Manning. On June 1, 1910, they married and would have two children: Elizabeth and John.

== Judicial experience ==
- Judge, Los Angeles Superior Court, September 1, 1923 – October 4, 1926
- Associate Justice, California Court of Appeal, Second District, Division Two, October 5, 1926 – December 30, 1932
- Associate Justice, California Supreme Court, December 31, 1932 – August 4, 1937

== Professional background ==
- Lecturer on Legal Ethics, University of Southern California, 1926 – 1932
- Manning, Thompson & Hoover, 1910 – 1923
- Reed, Black & Reed, 1909 – 1910

== See also ==
- List of justices of the Supreme Court of California

Legal offices
Preceded by John E. Richards	Associate Justice of the California Supreme Court; 1932–1937	Succeeded by Frederick W. Houser
Preceded by	Associate Justice of the California Court of Appeal, Second District, Division Two; 1926–1932	Succeeded by Albert Lee Stephens Sr.
