= Burke, Williams & Sorensen, LLP =

American law firm

- Headquarters: Los Angeles, California, U.S.
- No. of offices: 10
- No. of attorneys: Approximately 184
- Major practice areas: General practice
- Key people: John J. Welsh, Managing Partner
- Date founded: 1927; 99 years ago
- Founder: Louis H. Burke, Martin J. Burke, Thomas P. White
- Company type: Limited liability partnership
- Website: bwslaw.com

Burke, Williams & Sorensen, LLP (known as Burke) is an American law firm headquartered in Los Angeles, California, with offices throughout California.

== History ==
The firm was founded in 1927 in Los Angeles by brothers Louis H. Burke and Martin J. Burke, along with Thomas P. White. From its founding, the firm specialized in corporate law and business litigation. Two of the firm's founders, Louis H. Burke and Thomas P. White, later served as justices of the Supreme Court of California. In 1938, the firm began representing public agencies, a practice area that became one of its specialties.

The firm represented the city of Port Hueneme in a 1958 mandamus proceeding before the California Supreme Court, City of Port Hueneme v. City of Oxnard. A California Supreme Court case five years later, Forest Lawn Co. v. City Council, saw the firm defend West Covina's municipal annexation procedures. The firm also represented El Segundo and other respondents in a 1977 dispute over attorney's fee provisions of the California Coastal Zone Conservation Act, Great Lakes Properties, Inc. v. City of El Segundo. Nearly a decade later, Burke represented Camarillo before the same court in Building Industry Association of Southern California, Inc. v. City of Camarillo, a challenge to growth control ordinances enacted by voter initiative.

== Practice areas ==
As of 2024, Burke had approximately 170 attorneys practicing across ten areas, including litigation, public law, eminent domain and inverse condemnation, labor and employment, construction, environmental and land use, real estate and business law, insurance coverage, intellectual property, and education law. The firm maintains offices in Los Angeles, Oakland, San Francisco, San Diego, Orange County, the Inland Empire, Palm Desert, Marin County, Silicon Valley, and Ventura County.

== Recognition ==
As of 2025, Burke had 184 attorneys, up from 140 in 2022. In the 2025 edition of Best Law Firms, published by Best Lawyers, the firm received a national Tier 1 ranking in land use and zoning law, along with regional rankings in several other practice areas.

== Litigation ==
In July 2022, the San Diego City Attorney's Office sued Burke and former firm partner William Price for legal malpractice, alleging that Price had attempted to improperly influence a witness while defending the city against a wrongful termination lawsuit brought by former assistant city attorney Marlea Dell'Anno. The city had lost the underlying Dell'Anno case earlier in 2022, resulting in a $3.9 million jury verdict. It dismissed Burke from the case after a potential witness accused Price of attempting to influence his testimony.
