= William G. Lorigan =

American judge (1855-1919)

William George Lorigan
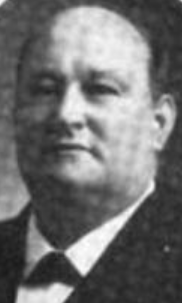

Associate Justice of the Supreme Court of California
- In office January 7, 1903 – January 1, 1919
- Preceded by: Jackson Temple
- Succeeded by: Thomas J. Lennon

Personal details
- Born: February 12, 1855 Melbourne, Australia
- Died: April 2, 1919 (aged 64) San Francisco, California, U.S.
- Spouse: Annie Francis Burgiss (m. 1880)
- Education: Santa Clara University

William George Lorigan (February 12, 1855 – April 2, 1919) was an American attorney and Associate Justice of the Supreme Court of California from January 7, 1903, to January 19, 1919.

== Biography ==
Lorigan was born on February 12, 1855, to Bartholomew W. Lorigan and Mary Moran in Melbourne, Australia. In 1862, his family emigrated to California. With his brother, Francis Lorigan, he studied at Jesuit-founded Santa Clara University. He also studied at St. Vincent's College in Cape Girardeau, Missouri.

After graduation, he read law at the firm of Moore, Laine, Delmas & Leib. In 1879, he was admitted to the California bar. Another brother, Charles M. Lorigan, also joined the bar and practiced in San Jose. William Lorigan was elected twice to the position of city justice of San Jose, California.

In 1890, Lorigan was elected judge of the Santa Clara County Superior Court. He was re-elected in 1896 and 1902.

On January 5, 1903, he was named as an associate justice of the California Supreme Court by appointment of Governor Henry Gage. Lorigan's appointment filled the seat of Jackson Temple, who had died in office. In 1904, Lorigan won the election for the two-year remainder of Temple's unexpired term. On November 6, 1906, Lorigan was nominated by the Republican Party and was re-elected to a 12-year term from January 1907 to January 1919. In November 1918, he sought another term but rumors persisted about the fragility of his health, and he was defeated in the election by Republican Thomas J. Lennon.

On April 2, 1919, Lorigan died in San Francisco shortly after stepping down from the high court.

== Honors and awards ==
In May 1903, Lorigan received an honorary Doctor of Philosophy from Santa Clara University.

== Personal life ==
On February 14, 1880, he married Annie Francis Burgiss in San Jose, California. They had a son, Barthol Lorigan, and daughter, Bergess Lorigan.

== See also ==
- List of justices of the Supreme Court of California

Legal offices
Preceded by Jackson Temple	Associate Justice of the California Supreme Court; 1903 – 1919	Succeeded by Thomas J. Lennon
