= Louis H. Burke =

American judge (1905–1986)

Louis Harry Burke
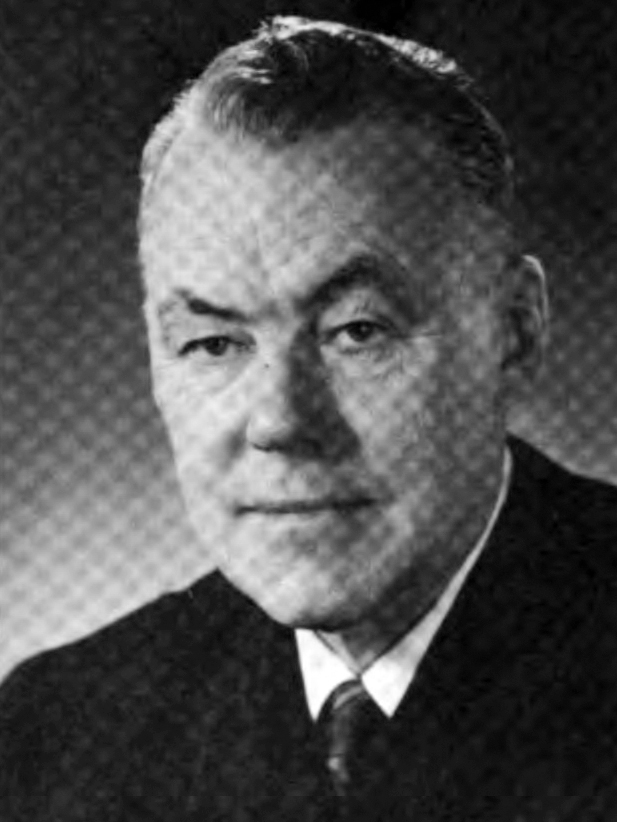

Associate Justice of the Supreme Court of California
- In office November 20, 1964 – November 30, 1974
- Appointed by: Governor Pat Brown
- Preceded by: B. Rey Schauer
- Succeeded by: Frank K. Richardson

Presiding Justice of the California Court of Appeal, Second Appellate District, Division Four
- In office October 1, 1961 – November 18, 1964

Personal details
- Born: January 4, 1905 Montebello, California, U.S.
- Died: April 28, 1986 (aged 81) Mendocino, California, U.S.
- Spouse: Ruth Ann Carnfield (m. 1933)
- Children: 5
- Education: Loyola Marymount University (B.Phil.); Loyola Law School (LL.B.)

Louis Harry Burke (January 4, 1905 – April 28, 1986) was an American lawyer who served as Associate Justice of the Supreme Court of California from November 20, 1964, to November 30, 1974.

== Early life and education ==
Burke was born in Montebello, California, to Joseph Burke (1870-1919) and Mie Anne Lucie Dion (April 13, 1881 – September 26, 1968), who had emigrated from Quebec, Canada, just prior to Louis' birth.

Burke attended Montebello High School, received a Ph.B. from Loyola Marymount University, and LL.B. from Loyola Law School in 1926.

== Legal and judicial career ==
In 1927, Burke and his brother, Martin Joseph Burke (November 24, 1903 – October 4, 1997), with Thomas P. White, founded the firm of Burke, Williams & Sorensen, LLP, also in its history called Burke, Hickson, Burke & Marshall. Both Burke and White went on to serve as California Supreme Court justices. Burke was appointed Montebello city attorney in 1928, and also served as general counsel for the League of California Cities. In 1942, he ran unsuccessfully for election as state attorney general against Robert W. Kenny.

In 1942, he volunteered for the U.S. Army. He served in the interim government and as a military judge in occupied Germany until his discharge from the Army in 1946.

Returning to California, he served as chairman of the California Veterans Welfare Board, and in 1951 was appointed to the Los Angeles County Superior Court bench. In 1952, he issued an arrest warrant for Judy Garland to compel her to testify in the divorce trial of her boyfriend, Sid Luft, from his wife, the actress Lynn Bari. In 1953, he was assigned to the Conciliation Court, where he fashioned a reconciliation agreement for couples. In 1958, he was appointed presiding judge of the Los Angeles County Superior Court, and published a book on divorce, With This Ring.

In 1961, Governor Edmund G. (Pat) Brown named Burke to the Court of Appeal and to the Supreme Court in 1964. In 1966, he stood for election and was retained with 64.7% of the vote. In 1974, he stepped down from the bench. He continued to sit as a judge pro tem on the Supreme Court, Court of Appeals and the Superior Courts.

Among Burke's notable cases were those involving the death penalty, including In re Anderson (1968), upholding the constitutionality of execution, followed by People v. Anderson (1974), striking it down.

Burke helped to create the National College for State Judges and its California counterpart; he served as chairman of the Section on Judicial Administration of the American Bar Association and of the Appellate Judges' Conference; and was an officer of the American Judicature Society.

In 1970, Burke was considered for appointment to the U.S. Supreme Court and as a candidate for California chief justice.

== Honors and awards ==
In 1961, Burke was awarded the St. Thomas More Award from the St. Thomas More Society. In 1962, Burke was recognized by the Southern California Chapter of the American Society for Public Administration with The Earl Warren Outstanding Public Service Award.

== Personal life ==
In 1933, Burke married Ruth Ann Horsfall (September 30, 1909 – October 10, 1997), and they had five children. The family lived in Montebello next to Burke's brother and law partner, Martin, and their mother, Lucie.

== Selected publications ==
- Burke, Louis H. (1984). "Chief Justice Phil S. Gibson". Cal. L. Rev. 72: 496.
- Burke, Louis H. (Fall 1977). "Chief Justice Donald R. Wright" (PDF). Hastings Law Quarterly. 4 (4): 675–676. Archived from the original (PDF) on October 16, 2015.
- Burke, Louis H. (1965). "Judicial Discipline and Removal, The California Story". UC Hastings Scholarship Repository.
- Burke, Louis H. (1958). With This Ring. New York, NY: McGraw-Hill.
- Burke, Louis H. (1955). "Conciliation: A New Approach to the Divorce Problem". Journal of the State Bar of California. 30: 199.

== See also ==
- List of justices of the Supreme Court of California

Legal offices
Preceded by B. Rey Schauer	Associate Justice of the California Supreme Court; 1964 – 1974	Succeeded by Frank K. Richardson
Preceded by	Presiding Justice of the California Court of Appeal, Second Appellate District, Division Four; 1961 – 1964	Succeeded by
