= John W. Preston =

American judge (1877–1958)

John White Preston
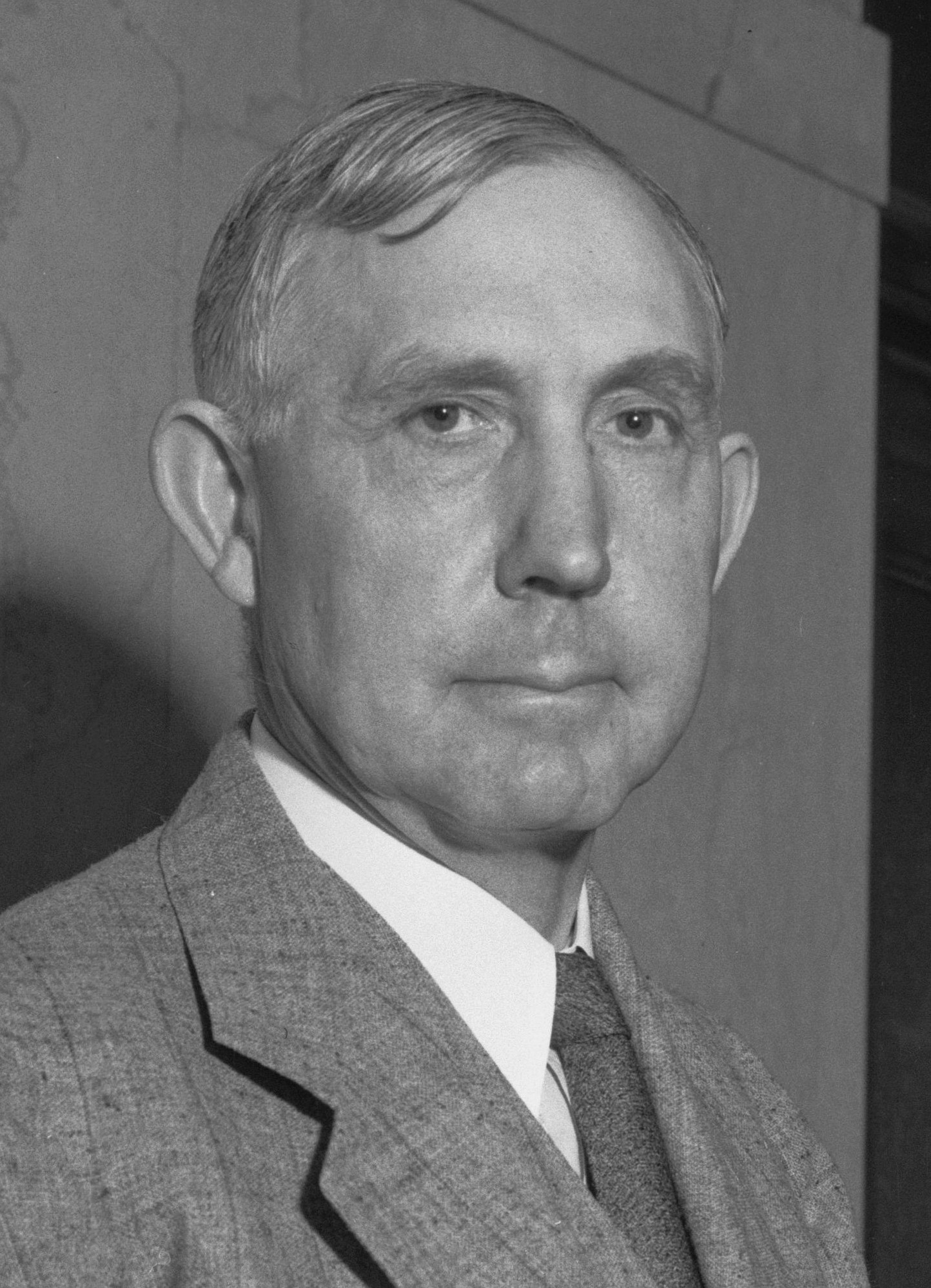
- Preston in 1928

Associate Justice of the California Supreme Court
- In office December 27, 1926 – October 6, 1935
- Nominated by: Direct election
- Preceded by: Frank G. Finlayson
- Succeeded by: Nathaniel P. Conrey

Member of the California State Assembly from the 6th district
- In office January 4, 1909 – January 2, 1911
- Preceded by: William D. L. Held
- Succeeded by: William D. L. Held

Personal details
- Born: May 14, 1877 Woodbury, Tennessee, U.S.
- Died: February 18, 1958 (aged 80) San Francisco, California, U.S.
- Party: Democratic
- Education: Burritt College (BA)

John White Preston (May 14, 1877 – February 18, 1958) was an associate justice of the California Supreme Court from December 27, 1926, through October 1935.

== Biography ==
Born in Woodbury, Tennessee, his parents were Hugh L. Preston and Thankful C. Preston, née Doak. In 1894, when he was 17 years of age, he obtained his undergraduate degree from Burritt College. In 1897, at the age of 19, he was admitted to the bar in Tennessee.

In 1902, he moved to Ukiah, California. In 1908, he was appointed to the state legislature. He served until 1910. From 1914 through 1918, he served as United States Attorney for the Northern District of California.

In November 1926, Preston was elected as Associate Justice of the California Supreme Court for the remaining four-year term ending January 5, 1931, of Thomas J. Lennon, who died in August. In November 1930, he successfully ran for a full term and was re-elected. In June 1935, Preston announced he would retire before the end of his term to serve as special government attorney in the Elk Hills naval oil reserves case, part of the Teapot Dome scandal. On October 6, 1935, he stepped down from the bench and was replaced by Nathaniel P. Conrey.

While on the Supreme Court, Preston is perhaps best known for acting as prosecutor at the 1930 pardon hearing of Warren K. Billings, who was convicted in connection with the 1916 Preparedness Day Bombing.

After retiring from the Supreme Court, he continued to practice law. Preston died on February 18, 1958, in San Francisco.

== Personal life ==
His brother, Hugh L. Preston, was a judge of the Mendocino County Superior Court for 11 years, and in May 1931 was appointed by Governor James Rolph as an associate justice to the California Court of Appeal, Third District.

== See also ==
- List of justices of the Supreme Court of California

Legal offices
Preceded by Frank G. Finlayson	Associate Justice of the California Supreme Court; 1926–1935	Succeeded by Nathaniel P. Conrey
