= Erskine Mayo Ross =

American judge (1845–1928)

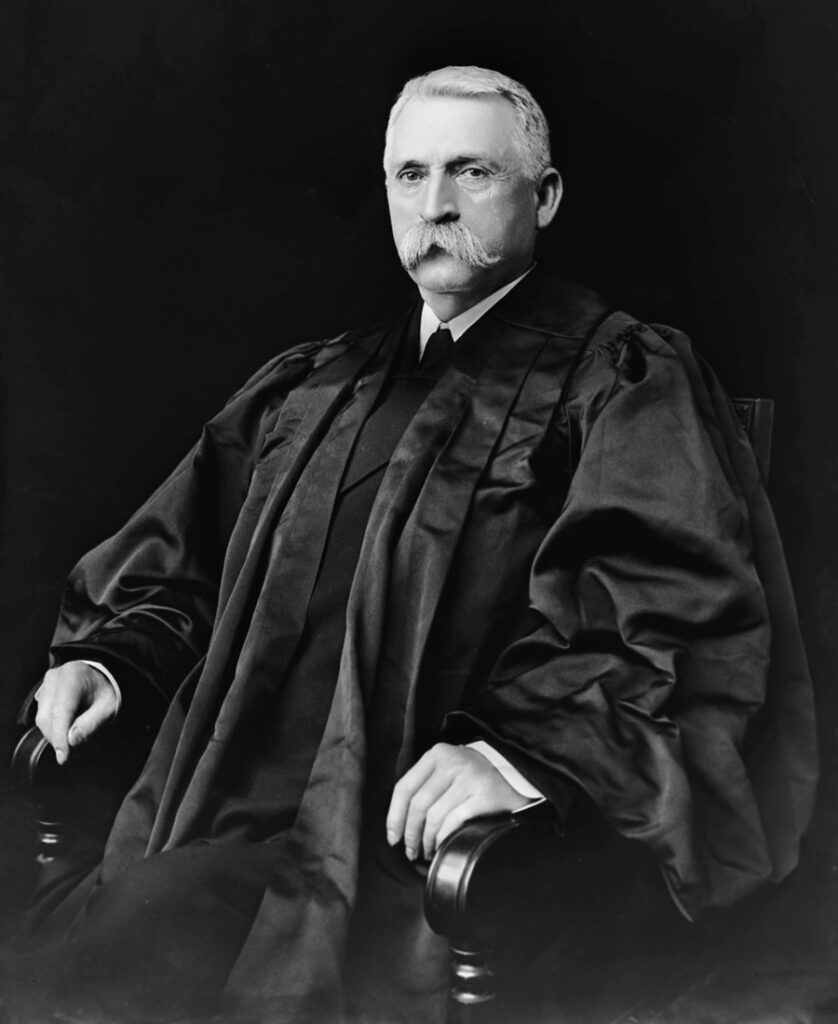
- Ross c. 1915

Senior Judge of the United States Court of Appeals for the Ninth Circuit
- In office May 31, 1925 – December 10, 1928

Judge of the United States Court of Appeals for the Ninth Circuit
- In office February 22, 1895 – May 31, 1925
- Appointed by: Grover Cleveland
- Preceded by: Seat established by 28 Stat. 665
- Succeeded by: Wallace McCamant

Judge of the United States Circuit Courts for the Ninth Circuit
- In office February 22, 1895 – December 31, 1911
- Appointed by: Grover Cleveland
- Preceded by: Seat established by 28 Stat. 665
- Succeeded by: Seat abolished

Judge of the United States District Court for the Southern District of California
- In office January 13, 1887 – March 5, 1895
- Appointed by: Grover Cleveland
- Preceded by: Seat established by 24 Stat. 308
- Succeeded by: Olin Wellborn

Associate Justice of the California Supreme Court
- In office January 5, 1880 – October 1, 1886
- Preceded by: Seat established
- Succeeded by: Jackson Temple

Personal details
- Born: Erskine Mayo Ross; June 30, 1845 Culpeper County, Virginia, U.S.
- Died: December 10, 1928 (aged 83) Los Angeles, California, U.S.
- Party: Democratic
- Education: Virginia Military Institute read law
- Known for: Alpha Tau Omega (co-founder)

Erskine Mayo Ross (June 30, 1845 – December 10, 1928) was an American attorney and jurist from California. He served as a United States circuit judge of the United States Court of Appeals for the Ninth Circuit and of the United States Circuit Courts for the Ninth Circuit and previously was a United States district judge of the United States District Court for the Southern District of California and a justice of the Supreme Court of California.

== Early life ==
Ross was born in Belpre on June 30, 1845, in Culpeper County, Virginia. He attended the Virginia Military Institute, leaving school twice during the Civil War to assist the Confederate States Army and then returning for further training, graduating in 1864.

== Legal and judicial career in California ==
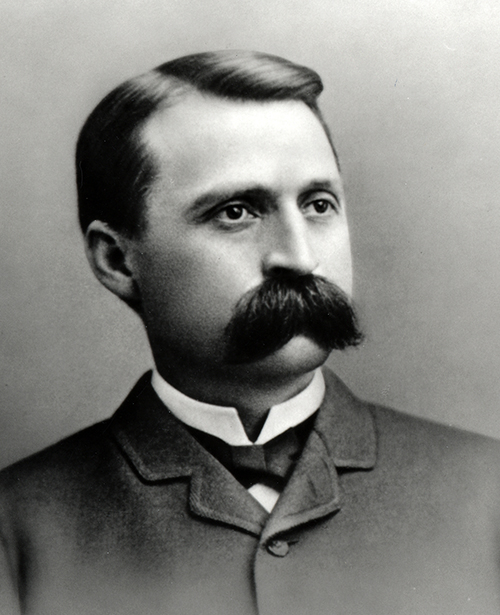
Ross c. 1880–1886

In 1868, Ross moved to Los Angeles, California, and joined the law office of his uncle, Cameron E. Thom, a prominent lawyer and former state senator who would later serve as Mayor of Los Angeles. After studying law at Thom's office for two years, Ross was admitted to the bar of the district court. In 1875, he joined the bar of the state supreme court, having already become wealthy and famous through his partnership with his uncle.

In October 1879, when adoption of a new constitution required elections for all court seats, Ross was elected to the Supreme Court of California on the Democratic and Workingmen's Party tickets and began his term on January 5, 1880. A Democrat, he was elected at age 34 without having served on the bench of any lower court. The newly elected justices drew lots to determine their length of term, and both he and John Sharpstein drew three-year terms. In October 1882, Ross was re-elected on the Democratic ticket along with Sharpstein to a 12-year term on the high court. In November 1885, he announced his plans to resign to return to private practice with law partner Stephen M. White effective January 1, 1886. Instead, Ross delayed his resignation and stayed on the court until October 1, 1886.

== Federal judicial service ==
Ross was nominated by President Grover Cleveland on December 16, 1886, to the United States District Court for the Southern District of California, to a new seat authorized by 24 Stat. 308. He was confirmed by the United States Senate on January 13, 1887, and received his commission the same day. His service terminated on March 5, 1895, due to his elevation to the Ninth Circuit.

Ross was nominated by President Cleveland on February 19, 1895, to the United States Court of Appeals for the Ninth Circuit and the United States Circuit Courts for the Ninth Circuit, to a new seat authorized by 28 Stat. 665. He was confirmed by the Senate on February 22, 1895, and received his commission the same day. On December 31, 1911, the Circuit Courts were abolished and he thereafter served only on the Court of Appeals. He assumed senior status on May 31, 1925. His service terminated on December 10, 1928, due to his death in Los Angeles.

== Bequest creating Ross Essay Contest ==
In his will, Ross bequeathed $100,000 to endow an essay contest administered by the American Bar Association. The essay contest spawned a well-known tax case, in which a winner avoided paying income tax on his prize money. Congress later amended the tax code so that such winnings would be taxed. The topic for the 2009 Ross Essay Contest is Write an open letter to the new president and Congress describing the most important priority for improving the U.S. justice system.

== Alpha Tau Omega ==
Ross was one of the founders of the fraternity Alpha Tau Omega.

== Personal life ==
On May 7, 1874, Ross wed Inez Hannah Bettis. In 1875, they had one son, Robert Erskine Ross. Inez died December 12, 1907, and in June 1909, Ross remarried to daughter of Agoston Haraszthy named, Ida Haraszthy Hancock, a wealthy widow in Los Angeles. Ross was a charter member of the Society of Colonial Wars in the State of California, admitted on November 30, 1895. General Society No 1360, California Society No. 17.

== See also ==
- List of United States federal judges by longevity of service

== Sources ==
- Shuck, Oscar T. (1901). History of the Bench and Bar of California, being Biographies of many Remarkable Men, a Store of Humorous and Pathetic Recollections, Accounts of Important Legislation and Extraordinary Cases, Comprehending the Judicial History of the State. Los Angeles, California: The Commercial Printing House.
- Frederick, David C. (1994). Rugged Justice: The Ninth Circuit Court of Appeals and the American West, 1891-1941. Berkeley, California: University of California Press. ISBN 978-0-520-08381-3.

== See also ==
- List of justices of the Supreme Court of California

Legal offices
Preceded by Seat established	Associate Justice of the California Supreme Court; 1880–1887	Succeeded by Jackson Temple
Preceded by Seat established by 24 Stat. 308	Judge of the United States District Court for the Southern District of California; 1887–1895	Succeeded by Olin Wellborn
Preceded by Seat established by 28 Stat. 665	Judge of the United States Circuit Courts for the Ninth Circuit; 1895–1911	Succeeded by Seat abolished
Preceded by Seat established by 28 Stat. 665	Judge of the United States Court of Appeals for the Ninth Circuit; 1895–1925	Succeeded by Wallace McCamant
