= Addison Niles =

American attorney and judge on the California Supreme Court

Addison Cook Niles

Associate Justice of the California Supreme Court
- In office January 1, 1872 – January 5, 1880
- Appointed by: Direct election
- Preceded by: Jackson Temple
- Succeeded by: Elections under new constitution of 1879

Personal details
- Born: July 22, 1832 Rensselaerville, New York, U.S.
- Died: January 17, 1890 (aged 57) San Francisco, California, U.S.
- Spouse: Elizabeth Caldwell (m. 1859)
- Relations: Niles Searls (brother-in-law)
- Education: Williams College (BA)

Addison Cook Niles (July 22, 1832 – January 17, 1890) was an attorney and served as Nevada County judge in California from 1862–1871 and as associate justice on the Supreme Court of California from 1872–1880.

== Biography ==
Addison Cook Niles was born in Rensselaerville, New York to John Niles (1797 – 1872) and Mary Cook (1803 – 1873). Niles had two younger brothers: John Hamiton Niles and Charles Mumford Niles; and six sisters: Laura Niles, Cornelia Deborah Niles, Mary Corinthia Niles, Henrietta Amelia Niles, and Emily Harriet Niles.

In 1852, Niles graduated from Williams College and began reading law in the office of Increase Sumner at Great Barrington, Massachusetts, and with Rufus King at Catskill, New York. In 1855, Niles was admitted to the New York bar, and then came to Nevada City, California, the center of gold prospecting.

Niles entered into private practice with various attorneys, including Thomas Bard McFarland, John R. McConnell, Aaron A. Sargent, and Niles Searls, his cousin and brother-in-law.

In 1862, Niles won election as a Union party candidate for Nevada County judge. In October 1863, he was nominated by the Union Party and was elected to a four-year term on the county court. In October 1867, he was re-elected to the trial court on the Union party ticket. In November 1867, he ruled against the Chinese and extended the California Statute "forbidding Chinese to give evidence against any white person", in the light of U.S. Civil Rights Law, to "against any citizen without distinction of color" —indicative of the struggles of judges in trying to adhere to equal justice while applying an inherently racist law.

In 1871, Niles was nominated by the Republican party and won the election as a justice of the California Supreme Court. In the election, he defeated Jackson Temple for the unexpired term of Silas Sanderson, who had retired in 1869. In 1879, all seats of the Supreme Court were up for election due to the new constitution, and Niles chose not run for re-election.

After stepping down from the court he struggled with a drinking problem. In 1884, he suffered a serious bout of illness but recovered. Financial setbacks swept away his fortune: "during the last few years of his life he was what the world calls poor." He died on January 17, 1890, in San Francisco at age 57.

== Honors and legacy ==
In April 1870, Central Pacific Railroad activated a new junction near Vallejo Mill to service trains on the first transcontinental mainline and those on the branch to San José. It was known as Niles for Addison Niles, who was then an attorney for the railroad as well as Nevada County judge. Later that year, Central Pacific added a railroad depot with a restaurant and saloon there. Concomitantly, the settlement Vallejo Mill became known as Niles. However, the settlement did not develop commercially until the 1890s, by which time Judge Niles had died. Since 1956, Niles is a district in Fremont, California.

The Niles railroad station was situated at the mouth of the Alameda canyon, which was the major course of Alameda Creek. After 1870, the canyon became known as Niles Canyon and the section of the heritage railroad therein the Niles Canyon Railway, which was part of the westernmost leg of the First transcontinental railroad.

== Personal life ==
On April 13, 1859, Niles married Elizabeth Caldwell in Placer County, California, and they had one son, Addison Perkins Niles.

His first cousin, Niles Searls, Chief Justice of the California Supreme Court from 1887 to 1889, was married to Addison's sister, Mary Corinthia Niles (1830–1910).

== See also ==
- List of justices of the Supreme Court of California

Legal offices
Preceded by Jackson Temple	Associate Justice of the California Supreme Court; 1872–1880	Succeeded by Elections under new constitution of 1879
