= Charles N. Fox =

American judge (1829–1904)

Charles Nelson Fox
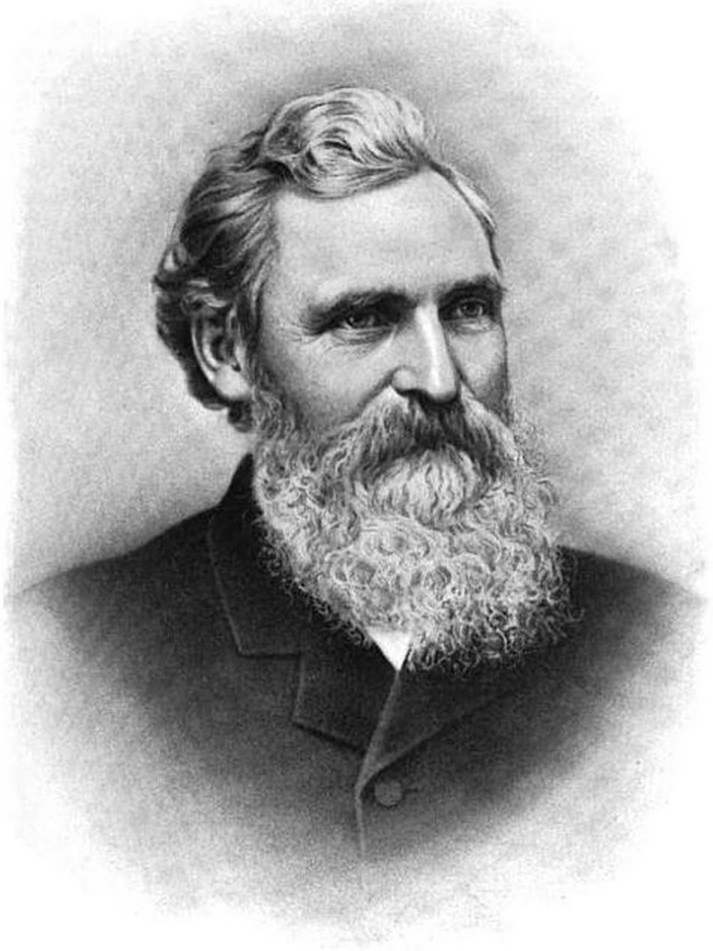
- California Supreme Court justice Charles Nelson Fox.

Associate Justice of the California Supreme Court
- In office June 1889 – January 1891
- Appointed by: Governor Robert Waterman
- Preceded by: Jackson Temple
- Succeeded by: John J. De Haven

Assemblyman from Alameda County of the California State Assembly
- In office September 1879 – September 1880
- Appointed by: Election

Personal details
- Born: March 9, 1829 Redford, Wayne County, Michigan, U.S.
- Died: May 1, 1904 (aged 75) San Francisco, California, U.S.
- Spouse: Mary Schwartz Rive (m. 1864)

Charles Nelson Fox (March 9, 1829 – May 1, 1904) was an associate justice of the Supreme Court of California from June 25, 1889, to January 7, 1891.

== Early life ==
Born at Redford, Wayne County, Michigan to Benjamin F. Fox, a farmer of English descent, Fox moved to Ann Arbor at the age of fifteen to earn his own living, and to attend the newly opened Ann Arbor University. Due to a bout of illness, and unable to afford tuition, he took a job at a printing office, and soon became an editor. He was elected city recorder of Ann Arbor, and acted as mayor of the city a portion of the term. He read law in the office of Kingsley & Morgan and was admitted to the bar by the Supreme Court of Michigan in 1856.

== Legal career ==
In August 1857, he moved to San Mateo County, California, was admitted to the California bar in July 1858, and shortly thereafter was appointed to fill a vacancy in the office of the district attorney. He won successive elections to the office for five years, when he declined further election. He was retained by the Spring Valley Water Company to attend to their business in San Mateo County, and succeeded in securing the legal rights and property without involvement in any lawsuits over a ten-year period. He then became a local attorney for the newly organized San Francisco and San Jose Railroad Company, securing their right of way through San Mateo County, and thereafter became president and attorney of the Western Pacific Railroad Company. He then moved from Redwood City to San Francisco and was appointed general attorney of the Spring Valley Water Company, and continued to act as one of its legal advisers for nearly forty years.

Fox declined several overtures to accept judicial and other positions, but ran for a seat as a Republican in the first session of the legislature held under the 1879 Constitution of California. He was made chairman of the judiciary committee and used his position to keep bad laws out of the statutes, reportedly causing the postponement of a thousand bills. Very few bills that he opposed ultimately passed, and every one that was passed against his opposition on the ground that it conflicted with the constitution, was eventually pronounced unconstitutional by the state Supreme Court. In September 1880, he resigned from the Assembly to serve as an elector for presidential candidate James A. Garfield at the Republican national convention.

Fox remained active in civic activities in Oakland. In June 1877, he helped organize a free reading room in the city. In February 1878, he was a founder of the Oakland Law Library. In March 1879, he was elected to the Oakland Board of Education, and served as its president.

In 1881, Fox was selected as general counsel for the Pacific Mutual Life Insurance Company. On June 25, 1889, Governor Robert Waterman appointed Fox as an associate justice of the California Supreme Court, following the resignation of Justice Jackson Temple. Fox served on the court until January 7, 1891. He authored one of the most noted opinions of the term in Jessup's Case, establishing a rule by which an illegitimate child can become legitimized.

After leaving the court, he was a member of the law firm of Campbell, Fox & Campbell, then with the firm of Fox, Kellogg & King. This firm became Fox, Kellogg & Gray until 1895, when it became the firm of Fox & Gray. He was working up until the day before his final illness, leaving his office on April 26, 1904, at about 5 p.m., and being stricken with paralysis at about 5 a.m. the following morning.

== Clubs ==
Fox became a member of the Odd Fellows at the age of 21, and was active and influential in that organization throughout his life, serving as grand master for the state of California in 1867-68, grand patriarch in 1868-69, and representative to the grand lodge of the United States in 1869-70. He was the first president of the Odd Fellows' home founded under his administration, acting in that capacity from 1893 to 1898. In October 1869, he was elected an officer of the Sons and Daughters of Temperance.

== Personal life ==
Fox had married Celestia M. Fox in Michigan, but she died in Redwood City, California, on January 29, 1859. On January 1, 1860, he remarried to Lucy Taylor in San Mateo, California. In June 1864, after her death, he remarried to Mary Schwartz Rice, a native of France, who came to California in 1857 and lost her first husband soon after her arrival. He had eight children, but only two survived him: Mrs. Mary Gray and Miss Ida Frances Fox.

His two brothers, Benjamin F. and George W. Fox, an attorney, and two sisters also lived in California.

== See also ==
- List of justices of the Supreme Court of California

Political offices
Preceded by Jackson Temple	Associate Justice of the California Supreme Court; 1889–1891	Succeeded by John J. De Haven
Preceded by	Assemblyman from Alameda County of the California State Assembly; 1879–1880	Succeeded by
