= California Civil Code =

Collection of statutes of the U.S. state of California

The Civil Code of California is a collection of statutes for the State of California. The code is made up of statutes which govern the general obligations and rights of persons within the jurisdiction of California. It was based on a civil code originally prepared by David Dudley Field II in 1865 for the state of New York (but which was never enacted in that state). It is one of the 29 California Codes and was among the first four enacted in 1872.

== Organization ==
The Field civil code was "thoroughly civilian in its approach and arrangement". Like the French Civil Code of 1804 and the Louisiana Civil Code of 1825, it featured the "standard tripartite Gaius system". The code also followed the civilian tradition of systematically classifying subject matter into "categories of decreasing generality, constantly proceeding from the general to the specific".

However, as completed in 1865, the substance of the Field civil code was "overwhelmingly, if not exclusively, that of the common and statutory law of New York in the 1860s". In that aspect, it was "by no means revolutionary but rather conservative". For example, as enacted in California, the Civil Code contains a definition of consideration, a principle in the common law of contracts which has no direct equivalent in civil law systems. Similarly, it codifies the mailbox rule that communication of acceptance is effective when dropped in the mail, which is a feature unique to the common law.

The Code was first adopted in 1872 by the California State Legislature and was signed into law by then Governor Newton Booth. The Code enacted in 1872 was essentially the Field civil code of 1865, "with some changes to adapt it to previous California legislation". It was soon discovered that many more provisions of the new Civil Code conflicted with existing California statutes and case law. In 1873, Stephen J. Field, Jackson Temple, and John W. Dwinelle were appointed to a Board of Code Examiners to investigate such issues. In 1874, the legislature adopted the board's proposed amendments to the Code.

The Civil Code is divided – like its civil law analogues – into four divisions: "the first relating to persons"; "the second to property"; "the third to obligations"; "the fourth contains general provisions relating to the three preceding divisions." Division One contains laws which govern personal rights while Division Two contains laws which govern property rights. Division Three codifies the substantive contract law of the State of California as well as various regulations relating to agency, mortgages, unsecured loans, extensions of credit, and other areas of California law. Division Four defines remedies available in lawsuits, what constitutes a nuisance, various maxims of jurisprudence, and other miscellaneous provisions which relate "to the three preceding divisions."

Although revolutionary for its time, the California Civil Code was actually the third successfully enacted codification of the substance of the common law. The first was the Code of Georgia of 1861 (largely based on the work of Thomas Reade Rootes Cobb independent of Field), which is the ancestor of today's Official Code of Georgia Annotated. Then Dakota Territory beat California to the punch by becoming the first jurisdiction to enact Field's civil code in 1866.

== Reaction ==
David Dudley Field II's audacity in trying to codify all of the general principles of the common law (including the law of property, domestic relations, contracts, and torts) into general statutory law in the form of a civil code was extremely controversial in the American legal community, both in his time and ever since. Most U.S. states (as well as most other common law jurisdictions) declined to pursue such an aggressive codification. The Restatements of the Law were developed in the 20th century as a compromise between those who felt the common law was a disorganized mess and those who valued the flexibility and richness of the common law. Only California, North Dakota, South Dakota, and Montana enacted virtually all of Field's civil code, while Idaho partially enacted the contract sections but omitted the tort sections. Later, Guam borrowed much of the California Civil Code for its own legal system.

Justice Stephen Field (who was David Field's brother and was largely responsible for introducing his work to California), praised the California Codes (including the Civil Code) as "perfect in their analysis, admirable in their arrangement, and furnishing a complete code of laws", while English jurist Sir Frederick Pollock attacked the Civil Code as "about the worst piece of codification ever produced" and called it "the New York abortion" (since it was never enacted in that state).

== Subsequent developments ==
Over the years, the Civil Code has been repeatedly amended by legislation and initiative measures. A very significant change to the Civil Code occurred in June 1992 when nearly all of the Civil Code's provisions relating to marriage, community property, and other family law matters were removed from the Civil Code (at the suggestion of the California Law Revision Commission) and re-enacted in the form of a new Family Code. The California Family Code went into effect on January 1, 1994.

Most statutes that deal with civil procedure are codified in a separate code, the California Code of Civil Procedure.

== See also ==
- California Code of Civil Procedure
- Law of California
