= California Code of Civil Procedure =

Codification of the law of civil procedure in the U.S. state of California

The California Code of Civil Procedure (abbreviated to Code Civ. Proc. in the California Style Manual (Note: The Bluebook recommends Civ. Proc. Code, but this abbreviation is rarely used in California except by the most dedicated Bluebook purists.) or just CCP in treatises and other less formal contexts) is a California code enacted by the California State Legislature in March 1872 as the general codification of the law of civil procedure in the U.S. state of California, along with the three other original Codes. (Note: The others were the Civil Code, the Penal Code and the Political Code.) It contains most California statutes that govern the filing and litigation of lawsuits in the Superior Courts of California, as well as legal notices that must be given in a variety of circumstances. It also includes statutes of limitations that control the period of time during which a lawsuit may be commenced. The Code originally governed the legal profession, but those were later moved to the Business and Professions Code.

Originally, the CCP was the codification of the Practice Act of 1851, as amended and revised. In turn, the Practice Act had been modeled after the New York Code of Civil Procedure of 1850, which was largely drafted by the law reformer David Dudley Field II. Hence, California is considered to be a "Field Code" state. The code took effect at twelve noon on 1 January 1873.

Like the 28 other California Codes, the CCP is frequently amended by the legislature. Unlike most other states, California never followed the federal trend towards transferring authority over procedural law to the courts through statutes like the federal Rules Enabling Act. Instead, the California Rules of Court cover only relatively minor matters such as the formatting of court papers and case management rules implementing the Trial Court Delay Reduction Act of 1986.

Nearly all important procedural provisions (i.e., the ones that can make or break a case) continue to exist in the form of CCP sections. As a result, whenever the Judicial Council of California identifies a major defect in California civil procedure, it cannot fix it by promulgating a new court rule, but must instead lobby the legislature and governor to amend the code.

Today, the California Code of Civil Procedure is comprehensive only with regard to trial court procedure. As a result of a bill pushed through the legislature at the suggestion of Chief Justice Phil S. Gibson in 1941, appellate procedure in California is governed primarily by the California Rules of Court (specifically, Title 8, Appellate Rules).

== Legal interpretation ==
Section 4 states that the provisions of the code and all proceedings under it are to be "liberally" construed: the common law rule that statutes "are to be strictly construed" has no application within the code.

== Pleading ==
As a Field Code state, California continues to subscribe to the "primary right" or "ultimate fact" theory of pleading (also known as "fact pleading") which has been traditionally followed by Field Code states. This means that California adheres to an arcane distinction between what constitutes pleading of a mere "fact", versus an "ultimate fact", versus a "conclusion of law". California is one of two states, the other being Virginia, which uses the demurrer as the primary pre-answer attack on the complaint. Most states and the federal courts have switched to modern "notice pleading" and use the motion to dismiss for failure to state a cause of action instead of the demurrer.

== Law of Evidence ==
The CCP partially codified the law of evidence, but in 1965, its evidentiary provisions were repealed and replaced by the new California Evidence Code, which unlike the CCP, was deliberately intended to displace and supersede the common law of evidence.

== See also ==
- United States civil procedure
- Law of California
