= Jackson Temple =

American judge (1827–1902)

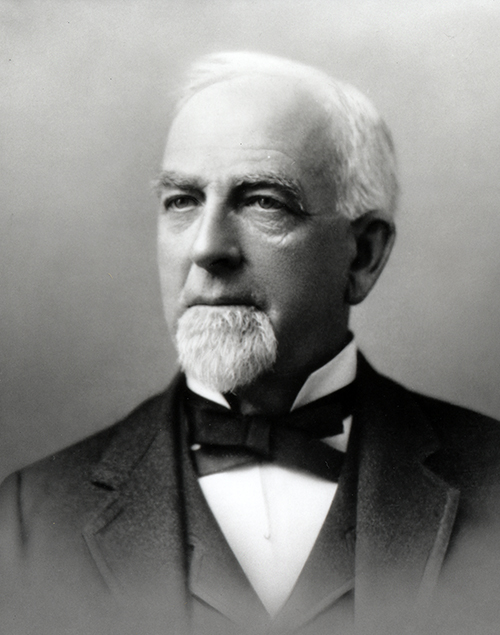

Associate Justice of the Supreme Court of California
- In office January 7, 1895 – December 25, 1902
- Appointed by: Direct election
- Preceded by: William F. Fitzgerald
- Succeeded by: William G. Lorigan

Associate Justice of the Supreme Court of California
- In office December 13, 1886 – June 25, 1889
- Appointed by: Direct election
- Preceded by: Erskine M. Ross
- Succeeded by: Charles N. Fox

Associate Justice of the Supreme Court of California
- In office January 10, 1870 – January 1, 1872
- Appointed by: Henry Huntly Haight
- Preceded by: Silas Sanderson
- Succeeded by: Addison Niles

Personal details
- Born: August 11, 1827 Heath, Massachusetts, U.S.
- Died: December 25, 1902 (aged 75) San Francisco, California, U.S.
- Spouse: Christianna Hutton Hood (m. 1870)
- Education: Williams College (B.A.); Yale University (LL.B.)

Jackson Temple (August 11, 1827 – December 25, 1902) was an associate justice of the Supreme Court of California. He served three separate terms on the court between 1870 and 1902.

== Early life and education ==
Temple was born in the town of Heath in Franklin County, Massachusetts on August 11, 1827, the son of a farmer. In 1851, he graduated from Williams College. Upon leaving college, Temple is reported to have gone to Newark, New Jersey, and commenced the study of the law in the office of Judge Ira C. Whitehead. After a time he went to Freehold, in Monmouth County and taught school. Afterwards, he continued his legal studies at Yale University, graduating in 1853.

== Legal and judicial career ==
Temple (standing, far right) with other Justices of the Supreme Court of California c. 1897–1898

In April 1853, Temple arrived in California, was admitted to the bar. After practicing in San Francisco for a few months, he joined his two brothers on their ranch in Petaluma. By 1855, Temple began practicing law in Sonoma County, including Mexican land grant litigation, and moved to Santa Rosa when the county seat relocated there. He practiced law with a series of partners: first, with William Ross; later, he joined with Charles P. Wilkins; and then with A. Thomas. In September 1856, Temple was a delegate to the state Democratic Party convention. In April 1859, he was admitted as an attorney and counselor by the Supreme Court of California by John Currey. In October 1863, he ran unsuccessfully for state district court judge, losing to J. S. Southard.

In September 1864, Temple was the Copperhead Democratic candidate for United States Congress from the Third congressional district, but was defeated by John Bidwell.

In 1867, when Henry H. Haight planned to run for governor he persuaded Temple to come to San Francisco and take over his law office.

=== First court term ===
In 1870, Justice Silas Sanderson resigned and Temple was appointed to the California Supreme Court by his friend, Governor Henry Huntly Haight. In October 1871, Temple became the Democratic candidate to succeed himself but Republican Addison Niles was elected to fill the remainder of Sanderson's unexpired term, which lasted until the amendment of the California Constitution required elections for all seats in 1879.

In January 1872, Temple stepped down from the court and went back into private practice with Haight and Charles H. Sawyer in the San Francisco firm of Haight, Temple & Sawyer. By 1874, Temple had moved back to Santa Rosa. In April 1876, Governor William Irwin appointed Temple as a judge of the 22nd District Court in Sonoma County. After two years he was elected to succeed himself for a six-year term. He served in this capacity until the superior courts came into existence under the Constitution of 1879, when he was elected a judge of the superior court for Sonoma County. Among his notable cases on the trial bench is David D. Colton Estate v. Leland Stanford (1890).

In 1882, Temple sought but did not obtain the Democratic nomination for Supreme Court. He ran instead on the Prohibition Party ticket, and lost the election to John Sharpstein and Erskine M. Ross.

=== Second court term ===
In October 1886, Temple was nominated by the Democratic Party, as well as the Grangers, and American Party, and elected to the Supreme Court to fill the vacancy from the resignation of Ross. Temple served two-and-a-half years on the court, from December 1886 until resigning in June 1889 due to poor health. He was replaced by the appointment of Charles N. Fox by Governor Robert Waterman.

Temple returned to private practice in Santa Rosa, opening a law firm with Judge John G. Pressley. From March 1891 to 1894, Temple also served as a Supreme Court Commissioner.

=== Third court term ===
In October 1894, Temple ran on the Democratic Party ticket and was elected as an associate justice to the Supreme Court for a 12-year term, which he was still serving at the time of his death. At the same election, Frederick W. Henshaw also won a 12-year term, and the two jurists replaced departing justices John J. De Haven and William F. Fitzgerald.

Temple died on December 25, 1902, in San Francisco, after a long illness.

== Personal life ==
In June 1869, he married Christianna Hutton Hood at Rancho Los Guilicos in Santa Rosa. They had six children and settled in Santa Rosa, California. She died on July 1, 1903, soon after his death.

== See also ==
- List of justices of the Supreme Court of California

Legal offices
Preceded by William F. Fitzgerald	Associate Justice of the California Supreme Court; 1895–1902	Succeeded by William G. Lorigan
Preceded by Erskine M. Ross	Associate Justice of the California Supreme Court; 1886–1889	Succeeded by Charles N. Fox
Preceded by Silas Sanderson	Associate Justice of the California Supreme Court; 1870–1872	Succeeded by Addison Niles
