= Roger J. Traynor =

American judge (1900–1983)

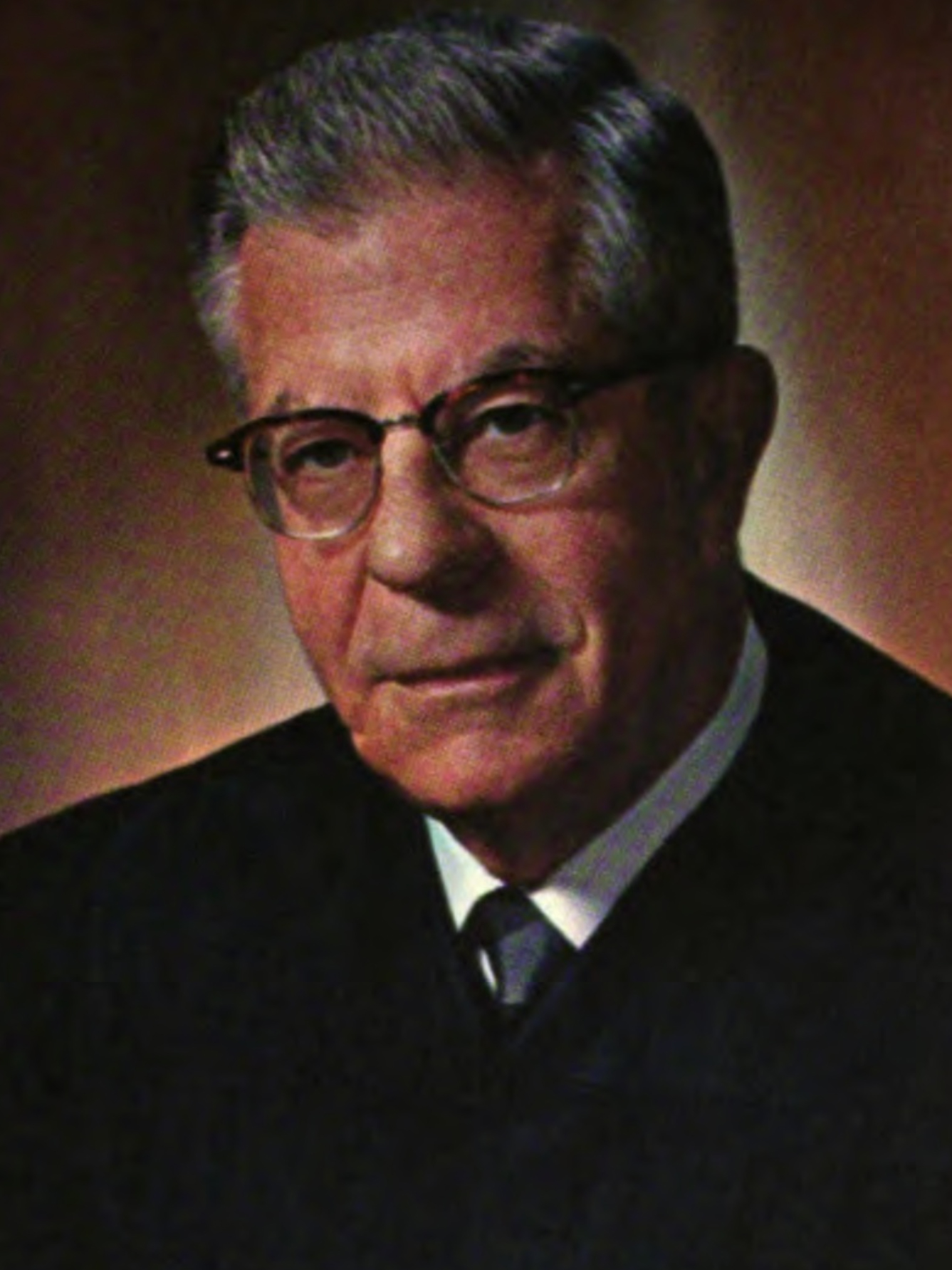
- Official portrait, 1967

23rd Chief Justice of California
- In office September 1, 1964 – February 2, 1970
- Appointed by: Pat Brown
- Preceded by: Phil S. Gibson
- Succeeded by: Donald R. Wright

Associate Justice of the Supreme Court of California
- In office August 13, 1940 – September 1, 1964
- Appointed by: Culbert Olson
- Preceded by: Phil S. Gibson
- Succeeded by: Stanley Mosk

Personal details
- Born: Roger John Traynor; February 12, 1900 Park City, Utah, U.S.
- Died: May 14, 1983 (aged 83) Berkeley, California, U.S.
- Spouse: Madeline E. Lackman (m. 1933)
- Children: 3
- Education: University of California, Berkeley (BA, MA, PhD, JD)

Roger John Traynor (February 12, 1900 – May 14, 1983) was an American lawyer who served as Chief Justice of California from 1964 to 1970 and was an associate justice of the Supreme Court of California from 1940 to 1964. Traynor had served as a deputy attorney general of California under Earl Warren, and an acting dean and professor at the UC Berkeley School of Law.

A jurist noted for liberalism and activism, Traynor's 30-year career as California's 77th Justice coincided with demographic, social, and governmental growth in California and in the United States. Traynor believed (in the words of his biographer, G. Edward White) that "the increased presence of government in American life was a necessary and beneficial phenomenon." After his retirement from the California Supreme Court, Traynor spent the last years of his life as a professor at the UC Hastings College of Law.

== Early life and education ==
Traynor was born and raised in Park City, Utah, then a mining town, at the turn of the century by Felix and Elizabeth Traynor. His parents were impoverished Irish immigrants from Hilltown, County Down.

In 1919, upon the advice of a high school teacher, he entered the University of California, Berkeley, though he had only $500 in savings to finance his college education. He won a scholarship at the end of his first year due to his excellent grades, and went on to earn a B.A. in 1923, an M.A. in 1924, and a Ph.D. in 1926; all these degrees were in political science. He also earned a J.D. from Boalt Hall, UC Berkeley's law school, in 1927. He earned the two latter degrees at the same time, while also teaching undergraduates and serving as editor-in-chief of the California Law Review. He was subsequently admitted to the State Bar of California that same year.

== Academics and politics ==
=== UC Berkeley ===
At Boalt Hall of UC Berkeley, Traynor wrote articles on taxation, while serving as editor-in-chief of the California Law Review, and became a full-time professor in 1936. In 1939, he started serving as the Acting Dean of Boalt Hall at UC Berkeley, where he had earned his J.D. degree.

=== Political positions ===
While he was a faculty member of the Berkeley Law School, Traynor also acted as a consultant to the California State Board of Equalization from 1932 to 1940, and to the United States Department of the Treasury from 1937 to 1940. In particular, he took a leave of absence from Berkeley in 1933 to work full-time for the Board of Equalization, and another leave in 1937 to help the Treasury Department draft the Revenue Act of 1938.

Before the Great Depression, nearly all California governmental functions were funded only through a general property tax on both real and personal property. This proved unworkable when property values collapsed. Through his work for the Board of Equalization, Traynor was responsible for creating much of California's modern tax regime, including the vehicle registration fee (1933), sales tax (1933), income tax (1935), use tax (1935), corporate income tax (1937), and fuel tax (1937). He also served as the first administrator of the California sales tax and supervised its deployment across 200,000 retailers.

In January 1940, he started working part-time as a Deputy Attorney General under California Attorney General Earl Warren (who later became Chief Justice of the United States).

=== UC Hastings and others ===
After retiring from the Supreme Court of California in 1970, Traynor became a professor at the UC Hastings College of Law. He also spent some time visiting and teaching at the law schools of University of Utah, University of Virginia, and the University of Cambridge.

== California Supreme Court ==
=== Appointment ===
On July 31, 1940, Traynor was nominated to the Supreme Court of California by Governor Culbert Olson. He was unanimously confirmed by the Qualifications Committee on August 13 and was sworn in the same day. In December 1940, he was retained by the voters in the election. In August 1964, Chief Justice Phil S. Gibson stepped down from the bench, and Governor Pat Brown appointed Traynor to the post.

=== Recognition and reputation ===
His obituary in the New York Times noted that "Traynor was often called one of the greatest judicial talents never to sit on the United States Supreme Court."

Traynor authored more than 900 opinions, and he gained a reputation as the nation's leading state court judge. During his tenure, the decisions of the Supreme Court of California became the most frequently cited by all other state courts in the nation. Several of Traynor's decisions were majority opinions that transformed California from a conservative and somewhat repressive state into a progressive, innovative jurisdiction in the forefront of American law.

Traynor was also noted for the quality of his writing and reasoning, and was honored during his lifetime with membership in the American Academy of Arts and Sciences (a rare honor for a judge). Many of his opinions are still mandatory reading for American law students. Also, Traynor did not uniformly join all opinions that could be characterized as "liberal" or "progressive" during his time on the Court; for example, he filed a two-sentence dissent in the landmark case of Dillon v. Legg (1968), which was a major step towards the modern tort of negligent infliction of emotional distress.

His 1948 opinion in Perez v. Sharp was the first instance of a state supreme court striking down a statute prohibiting miscegenation. Traynor also wrote a 1952 opinion that abolished the defense of recrimination in the context of divorce and paved the way for the social revolution of no-fault divorce. But his most significant and well-known contribution to contemporary American law is probably his 1963 creation of true strict liability in product liability cases. An earlier generation of judges had cautiously experimented with legal fictions like warranties to avoid leaving severely injured plaintiffs without any recourse. Traynor simply threw those away and imposed strict liability as a matter of public policy.

To those skeptical of government's power to redress social wrongs, Traynor's extraordinary work is notable for the degree to which it asserted the judiciary's power to resolve difficult issues of public policy, and to redefine the boundaries of corporate and governmental liability. In his biography of Traynor, White wrote: "If California was a testing ground for governmental theories of modern liberalism, Traynor was an architect of a judicial role compatible with the activities of the modern liberal state."

According to Goldberg, et al., "legendary jurist" Traynor was the "intellectual leader of the court" for much of the era when the California Supreme Court was striving to "reshape and expand the ambit of tort liability." Notable decisions from this period, extending from about 1945 to about 1980, include Greenman v. Yuba Power Products, Inc. (1963), a key case for strict product liability, Rowland v. Christian (1968), Li v. Yellow Cab Co. (1975), Sindell v. Abbot Laboratories (1980), and "one of the [court's] last and most aggressive efforts" to this end, Tarasoff v. Regents of the University of California (1976), which introduced "Tarasoff duty."

In July 1983, the California Law Review gave over all its space in issue 4, volume 71 to publishing tributes to Justice Traynor from several esteemed judges, law professors, and politicians, including Warren Burger, Henry Friendly, and Edmund G. Brown.

=== Criticism ===
The liberal tendencies of much of Traynor's work has since made him the subject of extensive criticism from American libertarians and conservatives, and tort reformers have often grouped Traynor together with Earl Warren as examples of judicial activists. For example, the conservative magazine National Review attacked Traynor's reasoning in the Pacific Gas and Electric Company case (Pacific Gas & Elec. Co. v. G. W. Thomas Drayage Co., 69 Cal. 2d 33 (1968)) in a 1991 cover story.

In 1998, Regulation (the Cato Institute's journal) published a harsh critique of the California tort law system by Stephen Hayward. He claimed that "rather than protecting life, liberty, and property, [it] has ... become a threat to these." In blunt language, Hayward identified Roger Traynor's liberalizing influence on the Court's view of liability as "the first breach":

In the 1944 case of Escola v. Coca Cola Bottling Co. ... Traynor introduced the idea of broad social fault. "I believe," Traynor wrote, "the manufacturer's negligence should no longer be singled out as the basis of a plaintiff's right to recover in cases like the present one." .... "Even if there is no negligence," Traynor wrote further, "public policy demands that responsibility be fixed wherever it will most effectively reduce the hazards to life and health inherent in defective products that reach the market." Note the appeal to the demands of public policy, rather than law .... While this line of reasoning might be the basis for a legislative debate over which public policies should be adopted to allocate and compensate for risk, Justice Traynor's opinion represents a clear case of legislation by judicial fiat.

In a 1966 essay addressed to both the legal community of his time and future generations, Traynor defended his judicial philosophy:

There are always some who note with alarm any appellate opinion that goes beyond a mechanical canvass of more or less established precedents. They include the diehards, dead set against all but familiar routines. They include the slothful, who would rationalize their own inertia. They also include carpers hostile toward any enlightenment, who would knowingly impair judicial vigil by keeping the visibility low. Slyly they equate justice with the blindfold image without articulating the corollary that decision would then be reduced to a blind toss of the coin. They do not state how problematic are the problems that reach the Supreme Court, and how great the need for judicial reasoning beyond formulas.

=== Retirement ===
On January 2, 1970, Traynor announced his retirement in order to avoid losing eligibility for retirement benefits under a California law that stripped judges of most benefits if they chose to remain on the bench past age 70. He became chairman of the National News Council, concerned with freedom of the press. Afterwards, he retired to Berkeley and died there in his home from cancer.

=== List of cases ===
- Bernhard v. Bank of America, 19 Cal. 2d 807 (1942) a litigant could be collaterally estopped from relitigating an issue that had been decided in an earlier suit against a different party
- Escola v. Coca Cola Bottling Co. of Fresno, 24 Cal. 2d 453 (1944) Early suggestion (in concurrence) of true strict liability for defective products
- Perez v. Sharp, 32 Cal. 2d 711 (1948) overturning a state law prohibiting miscegenation, Civil Code Section 69. The Supreme Court of California was the first state supreme court to abolish such laws.
- State Rubbish Collectors Ass'n v. Siliznoff, 38 Cal. 2d 330 (1952) the cause of action for intentional infliction of emotional distress (IIED)
- De Burgh v. De Burgh, 39 Cal. 2d 858 (1952) the defense of recrimination in the context of divorce
- People v. Cahan, 44 Cal. 2d 434 (1955) the exclusionary rule barring admissibility of evidence obtained in violation of the Fourth Amendment to the United States Constitution (as suggested by the U.S. Supreme Court in Wolf v. Colorado, 338 U.S. 25 (1949)), though Cahan would be rendered moot by Mapp v. Ohio, 367 U.S. 643 (1961)
- Pencovic v. Pencovic, 45 Cal. 2d 67 (1955) the rule that parents cannot evade their child support obligations through the invocation of freedom of religion by becoming ostensible religious gurus and founding religious communes.
- Drennan v. Star Paving Co., 51 Cal.2d 409, 333 P.2d 757 (1958). A party who has detrimentally relied on an offer that is revoked prior to acceptance may assert promissory estoppel to recover damages. This doctrine was incorporated into the Restatement (Second) of Contracts, but most jurisdictions have been loath to apply it except in cases involving general contractors relying on bids by subcontractors in competitive-bid contracts (similar to the facts in Drennan).
- Muskopf v. Corning Hospital District, 55 Cal. 2d 211 (1961) overturned the doctrine of sovereign immunity, although the Legislature promptly overrode Muskopf with the Tort Claims Act of 1963 as explained in Biggers v. Sacramento City Unified School District, 25 Cal. App. 3d 269 (1972)
- Bernkrant v. Fowler 55 Cal. 2d 588 (1961) the "moderate and restrained interpretation" doctrine for resolving conflict-of-laws problems
- Greenman v. Yuba Power Products, Inc., 59 Cal. 2d 57 (1963) true strict liability in tort for defective products (see product liability) which a 1996 panel of tort law experts subsequently ranked as the top development in tort law of the past 50 years.
- Vandermark v. Ford Motor Co., 61 Cal. 2d 256 (1964) extension of such strict liability from manufacturers to retailers and all others involved in the "overall producing and marketing enterprise that should bear the cost of injuries resulting from defective products,"
- Pacific Gas & Elec. Co. v. G. W. Thomas Drayage Co., 69 Cal. 2d 33 (1968) the rule that extrinsic evidence of trade usage or custom is admissible where relevant to prove a meaning to which the language of a contract is reasonably susceptible, undermining the parol evidence rule
- Jones v. H. F. Ahmanson & Co., 1 Cal. 3d 93 (1969) the rule that majority shareholders of closely held corporations have a duty to not destroy the value of the shares held by minority shareholders

== Personal life ==
On August 23, 1933, Traynor married Madeleine Emilie Lackman, a woman who shared his love of learning: she already held a M.A. in political science from UC Berkeley and would go on to earn a J.D. in 1956. They had three sons: Michael, Joseph, and Stephen. Michael followed his father into law; he attended Harvard Law School, became a partner with Cooley Godward Kronish LLP, and has served as president of The American Law Institute.

== See also ==
- US tort law
- US contract law
- List of justices of the Supreme Court of California

== Photographs ==
- High-resolution portrait from Bancroft Library archives. California Digital Library, Calisphere.

Legal offices
Preceded by Phil S. Gibson	Associate Justice of the Supreme Court of California; August 13, 1940 – September 1, 1964	Succeeded by Stanley Mosk
Preceded by Phil S. Gibson	Chief Justice of California; September 1, 1964 – February 2, 1970	Succeeded by Donald R. Wright
