= Frank G. Finlayson =

American judge

Frank Graham Finlayson

Associate Justice of the California Supreme Court
- In office October 4, 1926 – December 11, 1926
- Appointed by: Governor Friend Richardson
- Preceded by: Thomas J. Lennon
- Succeeded by: John W. Preston

Presiding Judge of the California Court of Appeal, Second District, Division Two
- In office January 1, 1919 – October 3, 1926
- Appointed by: Governor William Stephens
- Preceded by: New seat
- Succeeded by: Lewis R. Works

Member of the California State Assembly from the 73rd district
- In office January 2, 1893 - January 7, 1895
- Preceded by: Marcus Harloe
- Succeeded by: William Llewellyn

Personal details
- Born: March 24, 1864 Bendigo, Victoria, Australia
- Died: February 9, 1947 (aged 82) Los Angeles, California, U.S.
- Party: Democratic
- Spouse(s): Agnes Henderson (m. 1895; died 1936) Grace Davenport McConahy Reiniger (m. 1939)
- Education: University of California, Hastings College of the Law (LLB)

Frank Graham Finlayson (March 24, 1864 – February 9, 1947) served in the California legislature. He also served as a Justice of the Supreme Court of California for a few months in 1926.

== Early life and education ==
Finlayson was born March 24, 1864, in Bendigo, Victoria, Australia to James Ross Finlayson and Elizabeth Goodsir. In 1867, his family emigrated to California and he attended public schools. In 1885, he received a LL.B. degree from the University of California, Hastings College of the Law. He joined the California bar the same year.

== Legal and judicial career ==
Following graduation, he engaged for two years in private practice in San Francisco with the firm of Ladd & Finlayson. He then moved to Los Angeles and formed the firm with his father of Finlayson & Finlayson. In November 1892, he was elected on the Democratic Party ticket to the California State Assembly from the 73rd district for a term beginning January 1893. In January 1894, he published a treatise on the law of street improvements. In 1895, he was appointed an Assistant United States District Attorney for the Southern District of California, a post his father also held.

In 1910, he ran successfully for the position of judge of the Los Angeles County Superior Court, which he held from January 2, 1911 to January 1, 1919, and was presiding judge from May 1, 1917. In February 1918, during World War I, Finlayson issued a permanent injunction against striking workers of the Southern California Iron and Steel Company. In June 1915, Finlayson was assigned to try to the artesian water case of City of San Bernardino v. City of Riverside.

In December 1918, Governor William Stephens appointed Finlayson as presiding judge of the newly created California Court of Appeal, Second District, Division Two, for a term starting January 1, 1919. By a drawing of lots with the other two justices appointed to the court, Finlayson was assigned the long, 12-year term. In November 1904, the voters had approved a constitutional amendment creating the Court of Appeals, with the Second District located in Los Angeles. Due to its busy docket, the Second District was expanded in 1919.

In October 1926, Governor Friend Richardson appointed Finlayson as Associate Justice of the California Supreme Court to fulfill the remainder of the term of Thomas J. Lennon, who died in office. In the October 1926 election, Finlayson ran for the remainder of the short term, ending January 5, 1931, but he lost to John W. Preston.

After stepping down from the bench on December 11, 1926, he re-entered private practice in the firm of Finlayson, Bennett and Morrow. He served on the State Bar of California Board of Governors from 1937 to 1940. He died February 9, 1947, in Los Angeles.

== Personal life ==
On July 10, 1895, Finlayson married Agnes Thayer Henderson (June 29, 1867 – October 4, 1936), a widow, in Los Angeles. They had one daughter, Beatrice Finlayson (July 28, 1896 – November 10, 1979). Following the death of his first wife, on April 22, 1939, he remarried to Grace Davenport McConahy Reiniger (June 17, 1885 – October 27, 1961), also a widow.

== See also ==
- List of justices of the Supreme Court of California

Legal offices
Preceded by Thomas J. Lennon	Associate Justice of the California Supreme Court; October 4, 1926 – December 11, 1926	Succeeded by John W. Preston
Preceded by New seat	Presiding Judge of the California Court of Appeal, Second District, Division Two; 1918 – 1926	Succeeded by Lewis R. Works
