= Greenman v. Yuba Power Products, Inc. =

Greenman v. Yuba Power Products, Inc
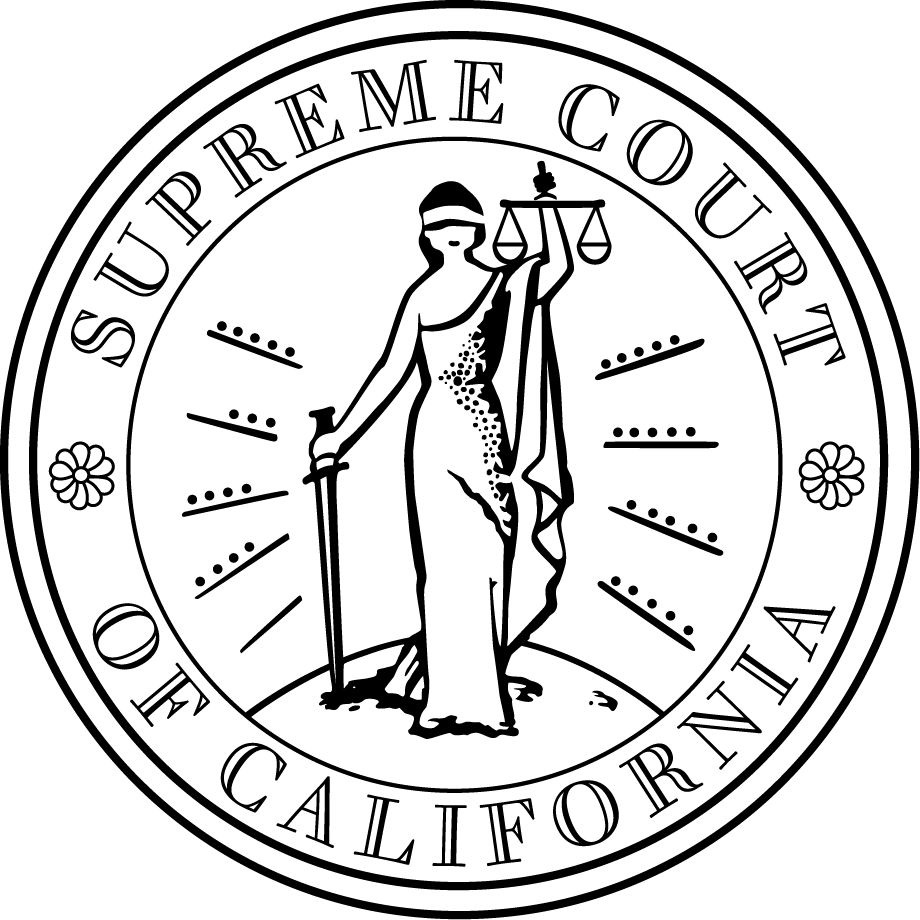
- Court: Supreme Court of California
- Full case name: William B. Greenman v. Yuba Power Products, Inc
- Decided: January 24, 1963
- Citations: Greenman v. Yuba Power Products, Inc. (1963) 59 Cal.2d 57 [27 Cal.Rptr. 697, 377 P.2d 897]

Case history
- Prior action: On appeal from the Superior Court of San Diego

Court membership
- Judge sitting: Judge Roger J. Traynor

Greenman v. Yuba Power Products, Inc, was a California torts case in which the Supreme Court of California dealt with the torts regarding product liability and warranty breaches. The primary legal issue of the case was to determine whether a manufacturer is strictly liable in tort when an article he places on the market proves to have a defect that causes injury to a human being. The case was originally heard in a San Diego district court where the verdict was against the manufacturer. This verdict was appealed by the manufacturer to the Supreme Court of California which was presided by Gibson, C. J., Schauer, J., McComb, J., Peters, J., Tobriner, J., and Peek, J., and the opinion was delivered by Judge Roger J. Traynor.

== Material facts ==
In 1955, the plaintiff, Mr William B Greenman received a Shopsmith, which is a power tool that can be used as a saw, drill and a lathe, as a Christmas gift from his wife. In 1957, he purchased the attachment to use the tool as a lathe and he used this attachment on several occasions with ease. However, on one such occasion, the attachment flew from the machine and hit him on the head, causing severe injuries. Over ten months later, he presented a written notice to the retailer and manufacturer (Yuba Power Products, Inc) for breach of warranties and filed a complaint against both of them for damages on the grounds of breaches of warranties and for negligence.

== Procedural history ==
In 1957, the plaintiff, Mr Greenman brought suit against Yuba Power Products, Inc and the retailer from where the Shopsmith was purchased, for breach of expressed and implied warranties and negligence. The case was heard in the Superior Court of San Diego County, by Judge Robert W. Conyers and an appointed jury. The jury in the case found in favor of the retailer claiming that the evidence did not support negligence or any breach of warranties on the side of the retailer and also ruled that there was no evidence to support breach of implied warranties by the manufacturer. Consequently, the plaintiff submitted a cause of action for negligence against the manufacturer. Accordingly, the court did find in favor of the plaintiff against the manufacturer and awarded a damages of $65,000 to the plaintiff, but ruled in favor of the retailer against the plaintiff on the charge of breach of warranties. The manufacturer appealed this judgement and the case was taken to the Supreme Court of California.

== Evidence presented ==
The evidence presented by the plaintiff in the preliminary trial primarily supported the negligence of the manufacturer and the inherent defects of the product. He brought in expert witnesses who testified that there were not enough set screws used to hold the various parts of the machine together and therefore, any regular vibrations would cause the tailstock of the lathe to move away from the wood, allowing it to fly from the lathe. With this information, the jury was able to reasonably conclude that the manufacture constructed the Shopsmith negligently. These witnesses also remarked how there were other efficient methods of fastening the parts of the machine, which could have prevented the injury if implemented. Besides witness testimonies, the plaintiff's case was also based on the proof that the injuries caused to him occurred while using the Shopsmith for its intended purpose and were not caused by an unforeseeable or inevitable action.

== Grounds of appeal ==
The manufacturer's sole defense in this case was the timing of the plaintiff's complaint. The manufacturer argued that the period of ten and a half months that passed after the injury was beyond the reasonably permitted time to create a cause of action for breach of warranties. To strengthen their argument, the defense brought up section 1769 of the California Code of Civil Procedure, which states that a purchaser of a product must notify the manufacturer of a breach of warranty within a reasonable time period. Due to the plaintiff's inability to notify the manufacturer within such a time period, the defense argued that this complaint must be quashed. Additionally, the manufacturer also contested the ambiguous reasoning behind the judgement of the San Diego Court. The manufacturer argued that it was not certain whether the verdict was based on negligence or breach of warranties. Due to this ambiguity, Yuba Power Products, Inc disputed the judgement and claimed that it was prejudicial in nature, as was the complaint breach of warranties filed by the plaintiff.

== Judgement ==
Judge Traynor led the judgement with an analysis of section 1769 and its applicability in the case. To reach a decision on this issue, he considered the requirements of section 1769. He points out that while this legislation is made to protect sellers from undue delayed claims for damages, the personal injury that was inflicted in this case plays an important role in the determination of the judgement. Accordingly, since there was a personal injury to the plaintiff caused by a defective product, the cause of action for damages was not barred as per section 1769.

Traynor went on to define the necessities to impose strict liability as per section 1732 of the California Code of Civil Procedure. Traynor expressed that to impose strict liability on a manufacturer, it is not necessary for the plaintiff to establish an express warranty as per section 1732 and therefore there is no need for an explicit contract between the manufacturer and the buyer. It is here where the court held that "a manufacturer is strictly liable in tort when an article he places on the market, knowing that it is to be used without inspection for defects, proves to have a defect that causes injury to a human being". Given that the tool was used for its intended purpose, and still caused injury to the plaintiff, it stands that the manufacturer should be liable. Traynor concluded his judgement with an explanation of the purpose of imposing strict liability in a case such as this, stating that it must be ensured that the cost of injuries that occur due to a defective product must be borne by the manufacturer that introduces such a defective product into the market. To prove the manufacturer's strict liability, it was sufficient for the plaintiff to establish that he had injured himself while using the machine in the way in which it was intended and that such an injury was the result of a defect in the manufacturing of the product. Every judge on the bench concurred with Traynor's opinion and the judgement of the lower court was affirmed.

== Ratio decidendi ==
The judgements of legal cases form precedent or ratio decidendi which can be applied in later cases. Greenman v Yuba Power Products, Inc has shaped the judgements of several cases after it. The ratio decidendi or the theories that this case has enshrined within the legal system are as follows

=== Warranties and Civil Code interpretation ===
Section 1769 of the California Code of Civil Procedure deals with the rights of parties to a sale, but it does not state that notice must be given regarding the breach of warranties that arises from a contract of sale between two parties. These independent warranties are not imposed by the Sales Act, but rather through common law precedent that may have acknowledged them. The notice requirement of section 1769 of the California Code of Civil Procedure should not be accepted by the court as a dense in cases of product liability when the defective product has caused injury to the consumer. Affirmations of facts or promises made by a seller about a product can be considered as expressed warranties if these affirmations have been made to convince a buyer to purchase a product, and if the buyer purchases the product based on these claims.

=== Strict liability ===
Perhaps the primary ratio of this case is "A manufacturer is strictly liable in tort when an article he places on the market, knowing that it is to be used without inspection for defects, proves to have a defect that causes injury to a human being". This ratio has been extended to cover a wider range of products that can exhibit defective qualities. Strict liability is to be imposed on the manufacturer in cases where a consumer is injured by a defective problem. This is to ensure that the costs of injury is not forced onto the consumer, but rather is covered by the corporation that put the defective product in the market. Liability is not to be governed by the law of contract warranties, but by the law of torts. Therefore, rules made to govern warranties that were developed for commercial purposes cannot be invoked to determine a manufacturer's liability when their product has caused injury. To establish a manufacturer's liability in a product liability case, it is sufficient that the plaintiff proves that they were injured while using the product for its intended purpose.

== Legal implications ==
This case has created several debates regarding law's protection of the consumer over the manufacturer and the difficulty for a defense in product liability cases. It has been pointed out that this case represents the plight of the non negligent manufacturer who faces lawsuits from the all powerful consumer. The case has also brought about questions regarding the definition of negligence and the threshold of proof required to prove a manufacturer's liability for product negligence. Another important legal implication of this case is the theory it created regarding defective products and its meaning, with the predominant argument revolving around the criteria necessary for a product to be considered a defective item. With regard to the aspect of a defective product, following this case, there was a question as to the relative extent to which a product must be defective to be able to establish strict liability. Accordingly, the Supreme Court's decision in Greenman v Yuba Power Products was applied to the later case of Cronin v JBE Olson Corp., which further extended the definition of a defective product with respect to negligence to include design defects of a product as well, thereby increasing the burden on manufacturers in product liability cases. Additionally, this case also sparked a debate regarding warranty claims and the intersection of contract and tort law in product liability cases. The nature of product liability cases which often include certain contracts, such as the warranties after sale and the contract of sale, creates the problem of ambiguity regarding legal jurisdiction. It is in response to these issues that legal scholars have published work which detail the scope of warranty breach within product liability cases and the parameters necessary for a warranty breach to amount to strict liability. Besides its impact on legal jurisprudence, the rationale and precedent set by Greenman v Yuba Power Products, Inc. has also aided the judgement of several cases that followed it. O'Neil v. Crane Co., an important California case in 2012 which dealt with product liability against an asbestos manufacturer whose product caused severe injuries to the plaintiff, cited Greenman in its judgement. Greenman was also useful in the 1999 case of Hodges v. Superior Court, in which a plaintiff brought charges against a car manufacturer following a serious accident.
