= B. Rey Schauer =

American judge (1891–1977)

Benjamin Rey Schauer
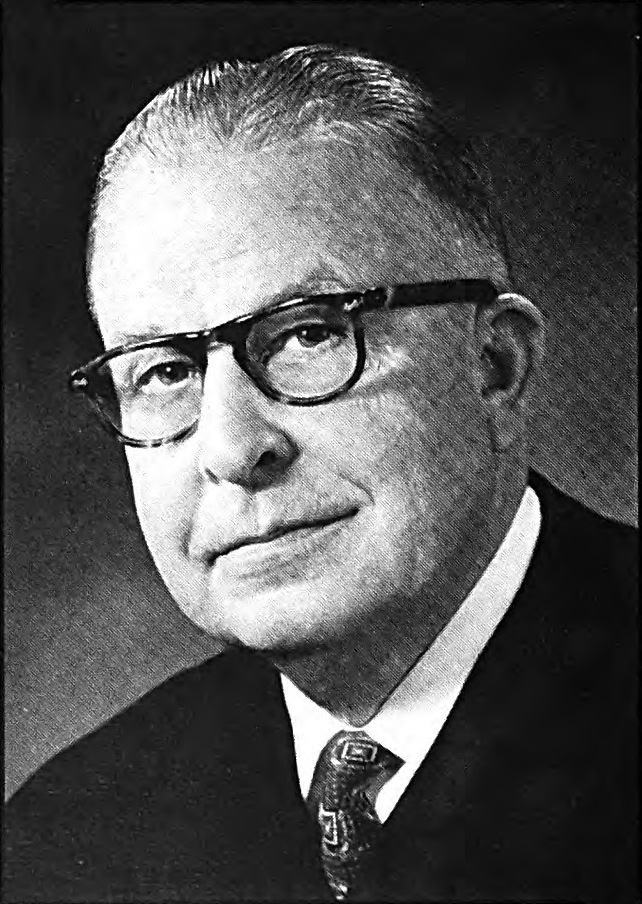
- Schauer c. 1963

Associate Justice of the Supreme Court of California
- In office December 18, 1942 – September 15, 1964
- Appointed by: Culbert Olson
- Preceded by: Frederick W. Houser
- Succeeded by: Louis H. Burke

Presiding Justice of the California Court of Appeal, Second District, Division Three
- In office October 22, 1941 – December 17, 1942
- Succeeded by: Walter Desmond

Personal details
- Born: May 9, 1891 Santa Maria, California, U.S.
- Died: March 5, 1977 (aged 85) Los Angeles, California, U.S.
- Spouse: Eva Elizabeth Summers (m. 1915; died 1969) Jean Marion Dewsbury
- Education: Occidental College (BA); University of Southern California Law School; Southwestern University School of Law (JD)

Benjamin Rey Schauer (May 9, 1891 – March 5, 1977) was an American attorney and Associate Justice of the Supreme Court of California from December 18, 1942, to September 15, 1965.

== Biography ==
Born in Santa Maria, California, Schauer received an A.B. from Occidental College in 1912, and read law to be admitted to the California State Bar in July 1913. He attended the University of Southern California Law School in 1916, and received a J.D. from Southwestern University School of Law, 1916. He was in private practice from 1913 to 1927, also serving in the U.S. Naval Reserve, where he achieved the rank of Lieutenant Commander.

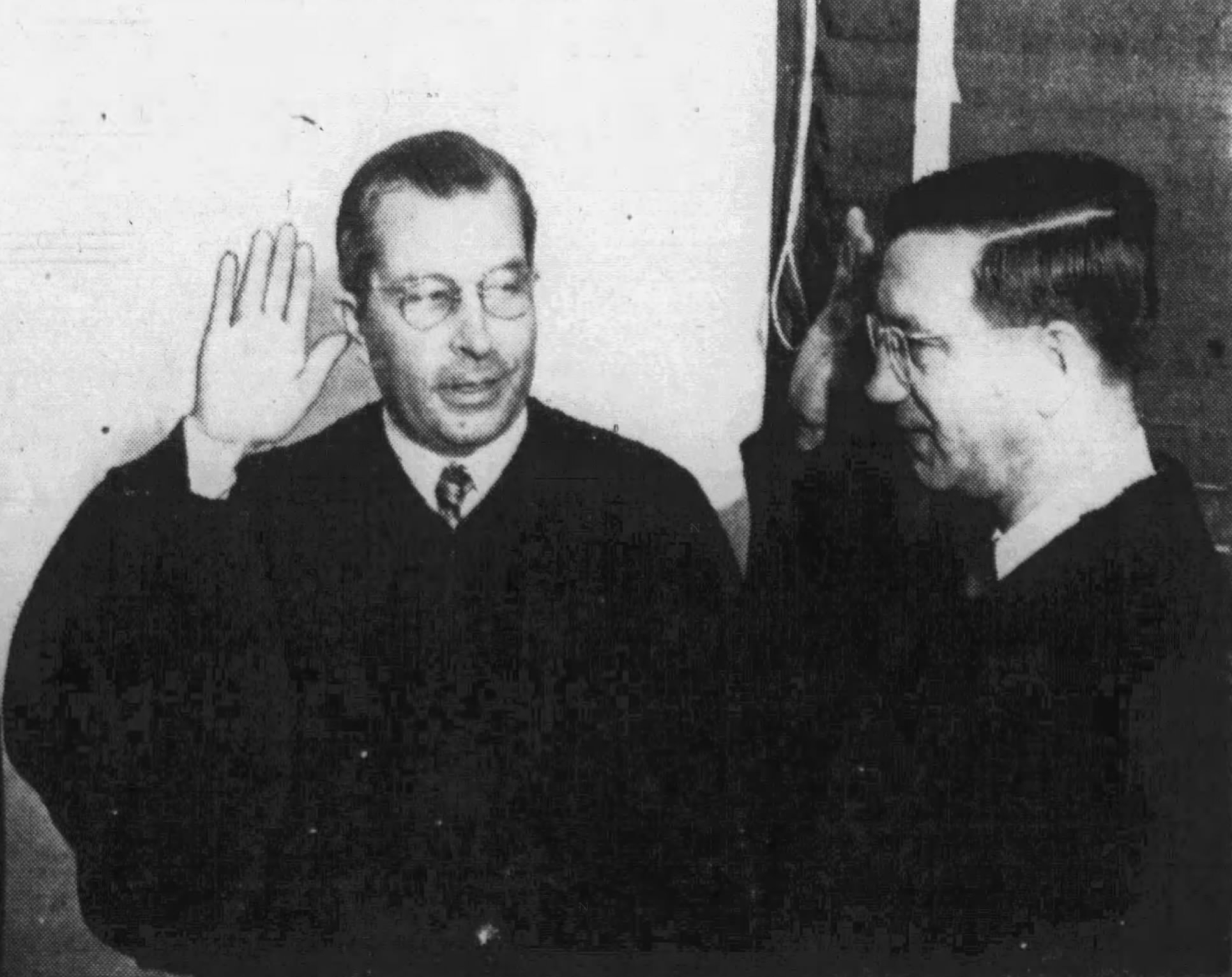
Judge Schauer swears in Ben Rosenthal as a judge of the Los Angeles Municipal Court, June 3, 1940

Schauer was appointed by Governor C.C. Young as a judge on the Los Angeles County Superior Court, where he served from August 4, 1927, to November 12, 1941. In November 1938, he overturned a contempt conviction against a 24-year-old woman who appeared in slacks in Los Angeles Municipal Court to testify in a robbery case, and declined the trial judge's request to change into a skirt. On appeal to the Superior Court, Schauer held the slacks were in "good taste" and not a violation of court protocol.

Schauer was then a Presiding Justice of the California Court of Appeal, Second Appellate District, Division Three, from October 22, 1941, to December 17, 1942.

In December 1942, Governor Culbert Olson appointed Schauer as an associate justice of the California Supreme Court, where he remained for 23 years. On the Supreme Court, Schauer was one of three Justices to dissent from the holding in Perez v. Sharp (1948), in which the court held by a vote of 4 to 3 that interracial bans on marriage violated the Fourteenth Amendment to the United States Constitution and therefore were illegal in California. One month later, Schauer wrote the majority opinion in Hughes v. Superior Court, holding that protesters were making an illegal demand when they sought to have businesses hire employees based on race, solely to achieve a racial balance proportional to that of the patronage of the business.

In August 1964, Schauer announced his retirement from the court effective September 15, 1964.

== Personal life ==
On October 21, 1915, Schauer married Eva Elizabeth Summers, a graduate of the University of Southern California. After her death on January 22, 1969, he remarried to Jean Marion Dewsbury in Los Angeles.

Schauer was a competitive sailor.

== See also ==
- List of justices of the Supreme Court of California

Political offices
Preceded by Frederick W. Houser	Associate Justice of the California Supreme Court; 1942–1964	Succeeded by Louis H. Burke
Preceded by	Presiding Justice of the Second District, Division Three, California Court of Appeal; 1941–1942	Succeeded by
