= Douglas L. Edmonds =

American judge

Douglas Lyman Edmonds
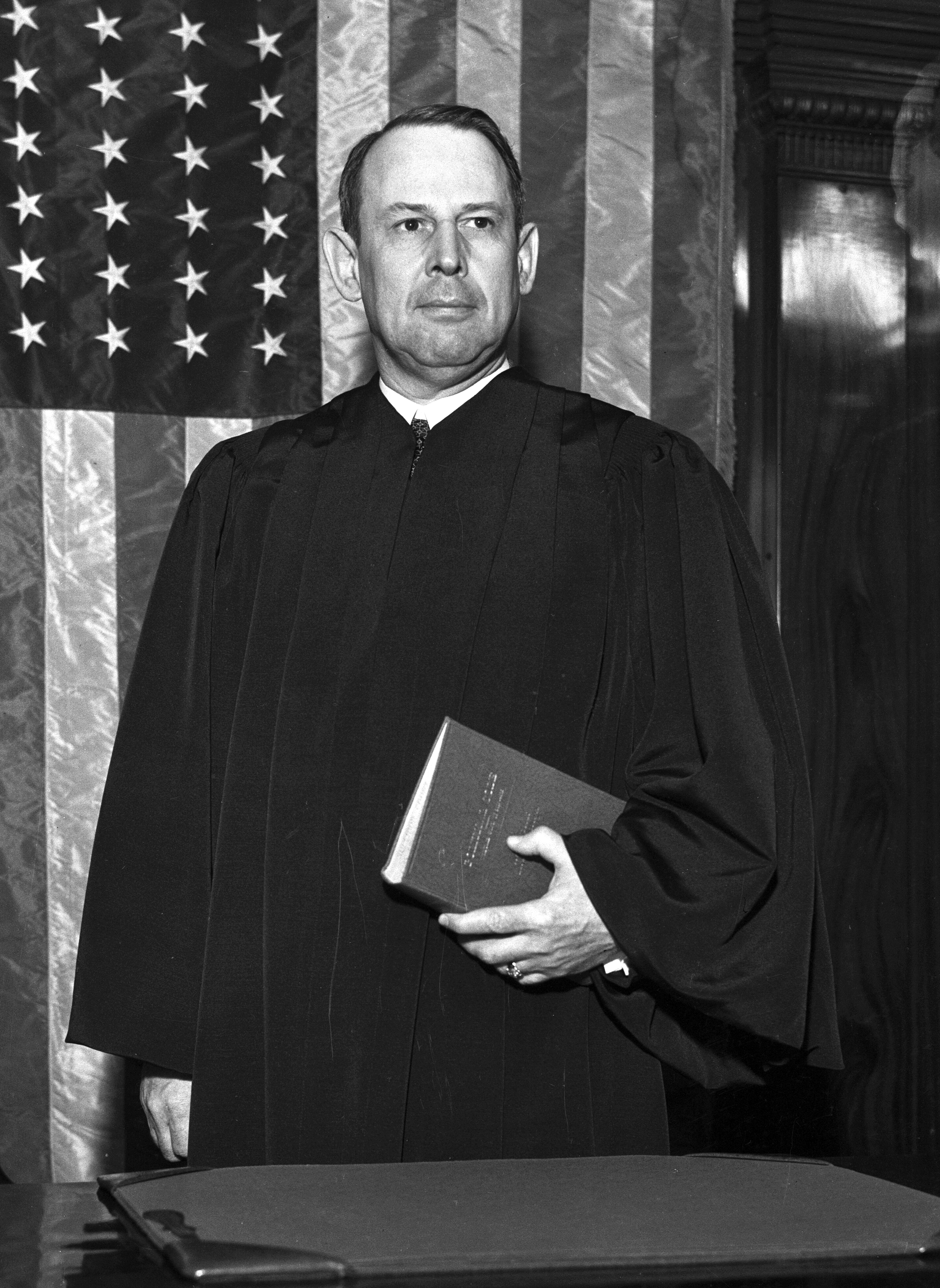
- Edmonds in 1936

Associate Justice of the Supreme Court of California
- In office November 19, 1936 – December 31, 1955
- Appointed by: Governor Frank Merriam
- Preceded by: Nathaniel P. Conrey
- Succeeded by: Marshall F. McComb

Personal details
- Born: November 20, 1887 Chicago, Illinois, U.S.
- Died: May 10, 1962 (aged 74) San Juan Capistrano, California, U.S.
- Spouses: Laura C. Leinbach (m. 1910; died 1946) Gertrude S. Forsyth (m. 1948)
- Education: University of Southern California Law School (LLB)

Douglas Lyman Edmonds (November 20, 1887 – May 10, 1962) was an American jurist, serving on the Supreme Court of California and the United Nations' International Law Commission.

== Early life ==
Edmonds was born in Chicago, and educated in the public schools of Chicago, Denver and San Diego. He later moved to Los Angeles and attended the University of Southern California School of Law. After graduation, he joined the California Bar in 1910.

After entering the bar, Edmonds practiced law in Southern California. In 1916, he ran for Assemblyman from the 63rd assembly district on the Republican ticket.

== Judicial tenure ==
In 1926, he became a Los Angeles Municipal Court judge. He was later appointed to the Los Angeles County Superior Court bench, where in 1936 he was presiding judge. In June 1936, Edmonds signed the order changing the name of Hollywood star Jean Harlow from Harlean Carpenter Rossen.

On August 6, 1936, associate justice Nathaniel P. Conrey announced that he would resign from the Supreme Court of California, and would not stand for election that November. On September 14, Governor Frank Merriam selected Edmonds to stand in Conrey's place on the November ballot, and, two days later, he was seated as an associate justice pro tempore on the court. Conrey, who concluded his active service on the court in August, intended to officially resign once Edmonds was elected, but he died on November 2, the day before the election. On November 19, Merriam formally appointed Edmonds, who had won the election, to the supreme court to fill the remainder of Conrey's term.

Edmonds moved from Los Angeles to San Francisco as a result of his bench appointment. In November 1942, he was retained in the election, along with John W. Shenk. After another reelection in November 1954, Edmonds served on the Supreme Court until his retirement in December 1955.

While serving on the court, Edmonds chaired the American Bar Association Section on Judicial Administration. In 1954, President Dwight Eisenhower appointed Edmonds to the United Nations' International Law Commission, where he served until 1961.

== Later career ==
After stepping down from the bench, he moved to Pasadena and practiced law at Guthrie, Darling & Shattuck. In 1957, Edmonds represented the cities of San Bernardino, Colton, and Redlands in the Orange County Water Suit. In 1961, he was the state chair of the unsuccessful election campaign of Tom Coakley for California Attorney General.

== Personal life ==
In 1910, he married Laura C. Leinbach and they had a daughter, Dorothy. His wife died December 22, 1946, in San Francisco, and he remarried in February 1948 to Gertrude S. Forsyth. On May 10, 1962, Edmonds was killed in an automobile accident near San Juan Capistrano, California. His wife, Gertrude, survived the car accident. He was a member of the Christian Science church.

== Organizations/affiliations ==
- Phi Alpha Delta Law Fraternity
  - Member, Erskine M. Ross Chapter
  - Los Angeles Alumni Chapter, Justice 1935
  - District Justice, 1938–1957
  - Supreme Vice Justice, 1946–1948
  - Supreme Justice, 1948–1950 and 1950–1952

== See also ==
- List of justices of the Supreme Court of California

Legal offices
Preceded by Nathaniel P. Conrey	Associate Justice of the Supreme Court of California; 1936–1955	Succeeded by Marshall F. McComb
