= Dooling (surname) =

Dooling is a surname. Notable people with the surname include:

- Brendan Dooling (born 1990), American actor
- Daniella Dooling (born 1967), American artist
- John Francis Dooling Jr. (1908–1981), American judge
- John Thomas Dooling (1871–1949), American lawyer
- Keyon Dooling (born 1980), American basketball player
- Lucinda Dooling (1954–2015), American actor
- Martin Dooling (1886–1966), American soccer player
- Maurice Timothy Dooling (1860–1924), American judge
- Maurice T. Dooling Jr. (1889–1965), American judge
- Peter J. Dooling (1857–1931), American politician
- Richard Dooling (born 1954), American writer and screenwriter
- Robert Dooling, American psychologist
- Victoria A. Dooling (born 1944), American politician
