= Marine mammals and sonar =

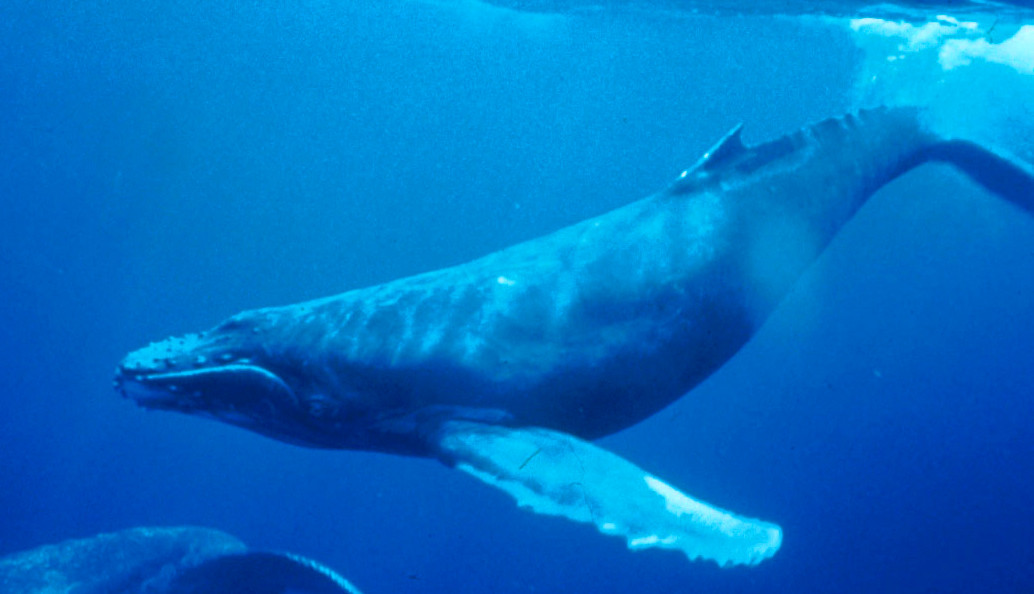
A humpback whale

The interactions between marine mammals and sonar have been a subject of debate since the invention of the technology.

Active sonar, the transmission equipment used on some ships to assist with submarine detection, is detrimental to the health and livelihood of some marine animals. Research has recently shown that beaked and blue whales are sensitive to mid-frequency active sonar and move rapidly away from the source of the sonar, a response that disrupts their feeding and can cause mass strandings. Some marine animals, such as whales and dolphins, use echolocation or "biosonar" systems to locate predators and prey. It is conjectured that active sonar transmitters could confuse these animals and interfere with basic biological functions such as feeding and mating. The study has shown whales experience decompression sickness, a disease that forces nitrogen into gas bubbles in the tissues and is caused by rapid and prolonged surfacing. Although whales were originally thought to be immune to this disease, sonar has been implicated in causing behavioral changes that can lead to decompression sickness.

== History ==
The SOFAR channel (short for "sound fixing and ranging channel"), or deep sound channel (DSC), is a horizontal layer of water in the ocean centered around the depth at which the speed of sound is at a minimum. The SOFAR channel acts as a waveguide for sound, and low frequency sound waves within the channel may travel thousands of miles before dissipating. This phenomenon is an important factor in submarine warfare. The deep sound channel was discovered and described independently by Dr. Maurice Ewing, and Leonid Brekhovskikh in the 1940s.

Despite the use of the SOFAR channel in naval applications, the idea that animals might make use of this channel was not proposed until 1971. Roger Payne and Douglas Webb calculated that before ship traffic noise permeated the oceans, tones emitted by fin whales could have traveled as far as four thousand miles and still be heard against the normal background noise of the sea. Payne and Webb further determined that, on a quiet day in the pre–ship-propeller oceans, fin whale tones would only have fallen to the level of background noise after traveling thirteen thousand miles, that is, more than the diameter of the Earth.

== Early confusion between fin whales and military sonar ==
Before extensive research on whale vocalizations was completed, the low-frequency pulses emitted by some species of whales were often not correctly attributed to them. Dr Payne wrote: "Before it was shown that fin whales were the cause [of powerful sounds], no one could take seriously the idea that such regular, loud, low, and relatively pure frequency tones were coming from within the ocean, let alone from whales." This unknown sound was popularly known by navy acousticians as the Jezebel Monster. (Jezebel was narrow-band passive long-range sonar.) Some researchers believed that these sounds could be attributed to geophysical vibrations or an unknown Russian military program, and it wasn't until biologists William Schevill and William A. Watkins proved that whales possessed the biological capacity to emit sounds that the unknown sounds were correctly attributed.

== Low frequency sonar ==
The electromagnetic spectrum has rigid definitions for "super low frequency", "extremely low frequency", "low frequency" and "medium frequency". Acoustics does not have a similar standard. The terms "low" and "mid" have roughly defined historical meanings in sonar, because not many frequencies have been used over the decades. However, as more experimental sonars have been introduced, the terms have become muddled.

American low frequency sonar was originally introduced to the general public in a June 1961 Time magazine article, New A.S.W. (Note: ASW is an acronym for "anti-submarine warfare") Project Artemis, the low-frequency sonar used at the time, could fill a whole ocean with searching sound and spot anything sizable that was moving in the water. Artemis grew out of a 1951 suggestion by Harvard physicist Frederick V. Hunt (Artemis is the Ancient Greek goddess of the hunt), who convinced Navy anti-submarine experts that submarines could be detected at great distances only by unheard-of volumes of low-pitched sound. At the time, an entire Artemis system was envisioned to form a sort of underwater DEW (Distant Early Warning) line to warn the U.S. of hostile submarines. Giant, unattended transducers, powered by cables from land, would be lowered to considerable depths where sound travels best. The Time magazine article was published during the maiden voyage of the Soviet submarine K-19, which was the first Soviet submarine equipped with ballistic missiles. Four days later the submarine would have the accident that gave it its nickname. The impact on marine mammals by this system was certainly not a consideration. Artemis never became an operational system.

Low-frequency sonar was revived in the early 1980s for military and research applications. The idea that the sound could interfere with whale biologics became widely discussed outside of research circles when Scripps Institute of Oceanography borrowed and modified a military sonar for the Heard Island Feasibility Test conducted in January and February 1991. The sonar modified for the test was an early version of SURTASS deployed in the MV Cory Chouest. As a result of this test a "Committee on Low-Frequency Sound and Marine Mammals" was organized by the National Research Council. Their findings were published in 1994, in Low-Frequency Sound and Marine Mammals: Current Knowledge and Research Needs.

Long-range transmission does not require high power. All frequencies of sound lose an average of 65dB in the first few seconds before the sound waves strike the ocean bottom. After that the acoustic energy in mid or high-frequency sound is converted into heat, primarily by the epsom salt dissolved in sea water. Very little of low frequency acoustic energy is converted into heat, so the signal can be detected for long ranges. Fewer than five of the transducers from the low frequency active array were used in the Heard Island Feasibility Test, and the sound was detected on the opposite side of the Earth. The transducers were temporarily altered for this test to transmit sound at 50 hertz, which is lower than their normal operating frequency.

A year after the Heard Island Feasibility Test a new low-frequency active sonar was installed in the Cory Chouest with 18 transducers instead of 10. An environmental impact statement was prepared for that system.

== Mid-frequency sonar ==
The term mid-frequency sonar is usually used to refer to sonars that project sound in the 3 to 4 kilohertz (kHz) range. Ever since the launch of the USS Nautilus (SSN-571) on 17 January 1955 the US Navy knew it was only a matter of time until the other naval powers had their own nuclear submarines. The mid-frequency sonar was developed for anti-submarine warfare against these future boats. The standard post-WWII active sonars (which were usually above 7 kHz) had an insufficient range against this new threat. Active sonar went from a piece of equipment attached to a ship, to a piece of equipment that was central to the design of a ship. They are described in the same 1961 Time magazine article by the quote "the latest shipboard sonar weighs 30 tons and consumes 1,600 times as much power as the standard postwar sonar". A modern system produced by Lockheed Martin since the early 1980s is the AN/SQQ-89. On June 13, 2001, Lockheed Martin announced that it had delivered its 100th AN/SQQ-89 undersea warfare system to the U.S. Navy.

There was anecdotal evidence that mid-frequency sonar could have adverse effects on whales dating back to the days of whaling. The following story is recounted in a book published in 1995:

Another innovation by the whalers was the use of sonar to track whales they were pursuing underwater. But there was a problem; as the boat gained on the whale, the whale started exhaling while still submerged. This produced a cloud of bubbles in the water that reflected sound better than the whale did and made a false target (akin to what a pilot does when releasing metal chaff to create a false radar echo). I suspect that this behavior by whales was simply fortuitous since exhaling while still submerged is simply a means by which a whale can reduce the time it has to remain at the surface, where surface drag will slow it down.

Whalers quickly discovered that a frequency of three thousand hertz seemed to panic the whales, causing them to surface much more often for air, This was a "better" use for sonar because it afforded the whalers more chances to shoot the whales. So they equipped their catcher boats with sonar at that frequency. Of course the sonar also allows the whalers to follow the whale underwater, but that is its secondary use. Its primary use is for scaring whales so that they start "panting" at the surface.

In 1996 twelve Cuvier's beaked whales beached themselves alive along the coast of Greece while NATO (North Atlantic Treaty Organisation) was testing an active sonar with combined low and mid-range frequency transducers, according to a paper published in the journal Nature in 1998. The author established for the first time the link between atypical mass strandings of whales and the use of military sonar by concluding that although pure coincidence cannot be excluded there was better than a 99.3% likelihood that sonar testing caused that stranding. He noted that the whales were spread along 38.2 kilometres of coast and were separated by a mean distance of 3.5 km (sd=2.8, n=11). This spread in time and location was atypical, as usually whales mass strand at the same place and at the same time.

At the time that Dr. Frantzis wrote the article he was unaware of several important factors.

- The time correlation was much tighter than he knew. He knew about the test from a notice to mariners which only published that the test would occur over a five-day period within a large area of the ocean. In fact the first time the sonar was turned on was the morning of 12 May 1996, and six whales stranded that afternoon. The next day the sonar was turned on again and another six whales stranded that afternoon. Without knowing the coordinates of the ships he would not have realized that the ship was only about 10–15 miles offshore.
- The sonar being used in the test was an experimental research and development sonar, which was considerably smaller and less powerful than an operational sonar on board a deployed naval vessel. Dr Frantzis believed that wide distribution of the stranded whales indicated that the cause has a large synchronous spatial extent and a sudden onset. Knowing that the sound source level was fairly low (it was only 226 dB (decibels) at 3 kHz which is low compared to an operational sonar) would have made the damage mechanism even more puzzling.
- The experimental sonar used in the test, Towed Vertically Directive Source (TVDS) which had the dual 600 Hz and 3 kHz transducers, had been used for the first time in the Mediterranean Sea south of Sicily the year before in June 1995. Previous activated towed array sonar research using different sources on board the same ship included participation in NATO exercises "Dragon Hammer '92" and "Resolute Response '94".

Since the source level of this experimental sonar was only 226 dB at 3 kHz re 1 uPa m, at only 100 meters the received level would drop by 40 dB (to 186 dB). A NATO panel investigated the above stranding and concluded the whales were exposed to 150-160 dB re 1 μPa of low and mid-range frequency sonar. This level is about 55-65 dB less (about a million times lower intensity) than the threshold for hearing damage specified at 215 dB by a panel of marine mammal experts.

The idea that a relatively low power sonar could cause a mass stranding of such a large number of whales was unexpected by the scientific community. Most research had been focused on the possibility of masking signals, interference with mating calls, and similar biological functions. Deep diving marine mammals were species of concern, but little definitive information was known. In 1995 a comprehensive book on the relation between marine mammals and noise had been published, and it did not even mention strandings.

In 2013, research showed beaked whales were highly sensitive to mid-frequency active sonar. Blue whales have also been shown to flee from the source of mid-frequency sonar, while naval use of mid- and high- frequency side-scan sonar was deemed "the most probable cause" of a mass stranding of around 50 short-beaked common dolphin (Delphinus delphis) on 9 June 2008 in Falmouth Bay, Cornwall, UK.

A review of evidence on the mass strandings of beaked whale linked to naval exercises where sonar was used was published in 2019. It concluded that the effects of mid-frequency active sonar are strongest on Cuvier's beaked whales but vary among individuals or populations, which may depend on whether the individuals had prior exposure to sonar, and that symptoms of decompression sickness have been found in stranded whales that may be due to their response to sonar. It noted that no more mass strandings had occurred in the Canary Islands once naval exercises where sonar was used were banned there, and recommended that the ban be extended to other areas where mass strandings continue to occur.

== Acoustically induced bubble formation ==
There was anecdotal evidence from whalers (see section above) that sonar could panic whales and cause them to surface more frequently making them vulnerable to harpooning. It has also been theorized that military sonar may induce whales to panic and surface too rapidly leading to a form of decompression sickness. In general trauma caused by rapid changes of pressure is known as barotrauma. The idea of acoustically enhanced bubble formation was first raised by a paper published in The Journal of the Acoustical Society of America in 1996 and again Nature in 2003. It reported acute gas-bubble lesions (indicative of decompression sickness) in whales that beached shortly after the start of a military exercise off the Canary Islands in September 2002.

In the Bahamas in 2000, a sonar trial by the United States Navy of transmitters in the frequency range 3–8 kHz at a source level of 223–235 decibels re 1 μPa m was associated with the beaching of seventeen whales, seven of which were found dead. Environmental groups claimed that some of the beached whales were bleeding from the eyes and ears, which they considered an indication of acoustically induced trauma. The groups allege that the resulting disorientation may have led to the stranding.

== Naval sonar-linked incidents ==
Worldwide, use of active sonar has been linked to about 50 marine mammal strandings between 1996 and 2006. In all of these occurrences, there were other contributing factors, such as unusual (steep and complex) underwater geography, limited egress routes, and a specific species of marine mammal — beaked whales — that are suspected to be more sensitive to sound than other marine mammals.

— Rear Admiral Lawrence Rice (11 April 2008)

Date	Location	Species and Number	Naval Activity	Reference
1963-05	Gulf of Genoa, Italy	Cuvier's beaked whale (15) stranded	Naval maneuvers	
1988-11	Canary Islands	Cuvier's beaked whale (12+) Gervais' beaked whale (1) stranded	FLOTA 88 exercise	
1989-10	Canary Islands	Cuvier's beaked whale (15+), Gervais' beaked whale (3), Blainville's beaked whale (2) stranded	CANAREX 89 exercise	
1991-12	Canary Islands	Cuvier's beaked whale (2) stranded	SINKEX 91 exercise	
1996-05-12	Gulf of Kyparissia, Greece	Cuvier's beaked whale (12) stranded	NATO Shallow Water Acoustic Classification exercise	
1998-07	Kauai, Hawaii	beaked whale (1), sperm whale (1) stranded	RIMPAC 98 exercise	
1999-10	U.S. Virgin Islands and Puerto Rico	Cuvier's beaked whale (4) stranded	COMPTUEX exercise	
2000-03-15	Bahamas	Cuvier's beaked whale (9), Blainville's beaked whale (3), beaked whale spp (2), Minke whale (2), Atlantic spotted dolphin (1) stranded	Naval MFA	
2000-05-10	Madeira	Cuvier's beaked whale (3) stranded	NATO Linked Seas 2000 and MFA	
2002-09	Canary Islands	Cuvier's beaked whale (9), Gervais' beaked whale (1), Blainville's beaked whale (1), beaked whale spp. (3) stranded	Neo Tapon 2002 exercise and MFA	
2003-05	Haro Strait, Washington	Harbor porpoise (14), Dall's porpoise (1) Orca avoidance "stampede"	U.S.S. Shoup transiting while using MFA (AN/SQS-53C)	
2004-07	Kauai, Hawaii	Melon-headed whale (~200) avoidance "stampede"	RIMPAC 04 exercise with MFA	
2004-07-22	Canary Islands	Cuvier's beaked whale (4) stranded	Majestic Eagle 04 exercise	
2005-10-25	Marion Bay, Tasmania	Long-finned pilot whales (145) stranded	Two minesweepers using active sonar	
2006-01-26	Almería Coast, Spain	Cuvier's beaked whale (4) stranded	HMS Kent using active MF sonar	
2008-06-09	Cornwall, UK	Short-beaked common dolphin (Delphinus delphis) (c50, at least 26 died)	Naval exercise but no ship sonar in use except HF hydrographic sonar on HMS Enterprise	

== Scientific attention ==
Since the 1990s, scientific research has been carried out on the effects of sonar on marine life. This scientific research is reported in peer reviewed journals and at international conferences such as The Effects of Sound on Marine Mammals and The Effects of Noise on Aquatic Life.

A study on the effects of certain sonar frequencies on blue whales was published in 2013. Mid-frequency (1–10 kHz) military sonars have been associated with lethal mass strandings of deep-diving toothed whales, but the effects on endangered baleen whale species were virtually unknown. Controlled exposure experiments, using simulated military sonar and other mid-frequency sounds, measured behavioral responses of tagged blue whales in feeding areas within the Southern California Bight. Despite using source levels orders of magnitude below some operational military systems, the results demonstrated that mid-frequency sound can significantly affect blue whale behavior, especially during deep feeding modes. When a response occurred, behavioral changes varied widely from cessation of deep feeding to increased swimming speed and directed travel away from the sound source. The variability of these behavioral responses was largely influenced by a complex interaction of behavioral state, the type of mid-frequency sound and received sound level. Sonar-induced disruption of feeding and displacement from high-quality prey patches could have significant and previously undocumented impacts on baleen whale foraging ecology, individual fitness and population health.

== Court cases ==
Since mid-frequency sonar has been correlated with mass cetacean strandings throughout the world's oceans, it has been singled out by some environmentalists as a focus for activism. A lawsuit filed by the Natural Resources Defense Council (NRDC) in Santa Monica, California on 20 October 2005 contended that the U.S. Navy has conducted sonar exercises in violation of several environmental laws, including the National Environmental Policy Act, the Marine Mammal Protection Act, and the Endangered Species Act. Mid-frequency sonar is by far the most common type of active sonar in use by the world's navies, and has been widely deployed since the 1960s.

On November 13, 2007, a United States appeals court restored a ban on the U.S. Navy's use of submarine-hunting sonar in training missions off Southern California until it adopted better safeguards for whales, dolphins and other marine mammals. On 16 January 2008, President George W. Bush exempted the US Navy from the law and argued that naval exercises are crucial to national security. On 4 February 2008, a Federal judge ruled that despite President Bush's decision to exempt it, the Navy must follow environmental laws placing strict limits on mid-frequency sonar. In a 36-page decision, U.S. District Judge Florence-Marie Cooper wrote that the Navy is not "exempted from compliance with the National Environmental Policy Act" and the court injunction creating a 12-nautical-mile (22 km) no-sonar zone off Southern California. On 29 February 2008, a three-judge federal appeals court panel upheld the lower court order requiring the Navy to take precautions during sonar training to minimize harm to marine life. In Winter v. Natural Resources Defense Council. the U.S. Supreme Court overturned the circuit court ruling in a 5:4 decision on 12 November 2008.

== Mitigation methods ==
Environmental impacts of the operation of active sonar are required to be carried out by US law. Procedures for minimising the impact of sonar are developed in each case where there is significant impact.

The impact of underwater sound can be reduced by limiting the sound exposure received by an animal. The maximum sound exposure level recommended by Southall et al. for cetaceans is 215 dB re 1 μPa^{2} s for hearing damage. Maximum sound pressure level for behavioural effects is dependent on context.

In the US, a great deal of the legal and media conflict on this issue has to do with questions of who determines what type of mitigation is sufficient. Coastal commissions, for example, were originally thought to only have legal responsibility for beachfront property, and state waters (three miles into sea). Because active sonar is instrumental to ship defence, mitigation measures that may seem sensible to a civilian agency without any military or scientific background can have disastrous effects on training and readiness. The US Navy therefore often define their own mitigation requirements.

Examples of mitigation measures include:

1. not operating at nighttime
2. not operating at specific areas of the ocean that are considered sensitive
3. slow ramp-up of intensity of signal to give cetaceans a warning
4. air cover to search for cetaceans
5. not operating when cetaceans are known to be within a certain range
6. onboard observers from civilian groups
7. using fish-finders to look for cetaceans in the vicinity
8. large margins of safety for exposure levels
9. not operating when dolphins are bow-riding
10. operations at less than full power
11. paid teams of veterans to investigate strandings after sonar operation.

== See also ==
- Animal echolocation (sonar)
