= John Dooling =

John Dooling may refer to:

- John Francis Dooling Jr., American judge
- John Thomas Dooling, assistant district attorney for New York City
