= Christine Erbe =

German-Australian physicist

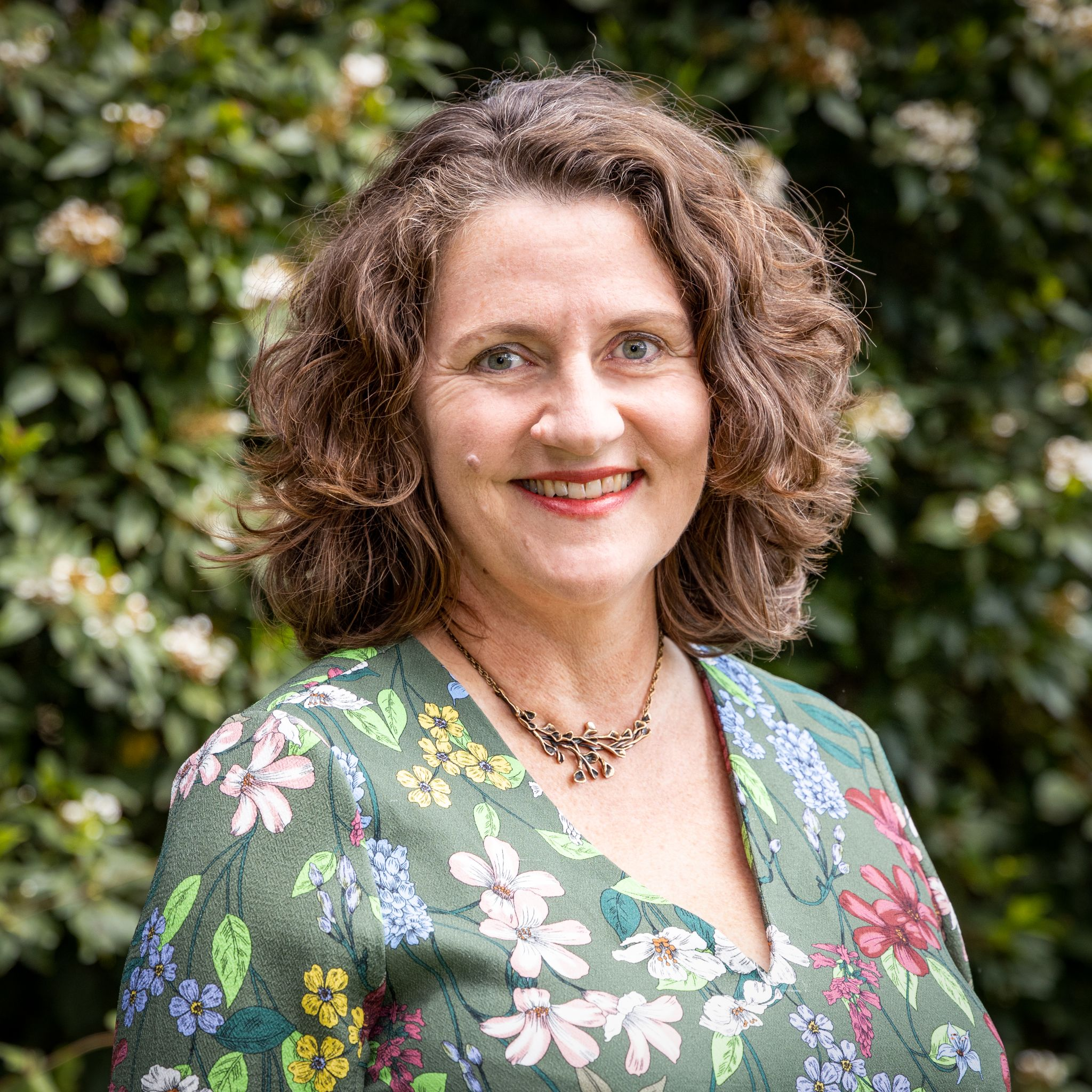
- Education: Technische Universität Dortmund, University of British Columbia, Queensland University of Technology
- Known for: Research on underwater noise and its impact on marine mammals; acoustic masking
- Awards: Fellow of the Acoustical Society of America (2016)
- Scientific career
- Fields: Physics, Underwater acoustics
- Workplaces: Curtin University (Centre for Marine Science and Technology)
- Thesis: The Masking of Beluga Whale (Delphinapterus leucas) Vocalizations by Icebreaker Noise (1997)
- Doctoral advisors: David M. Farmer; John K. Ford; Matthew J. Yedlin

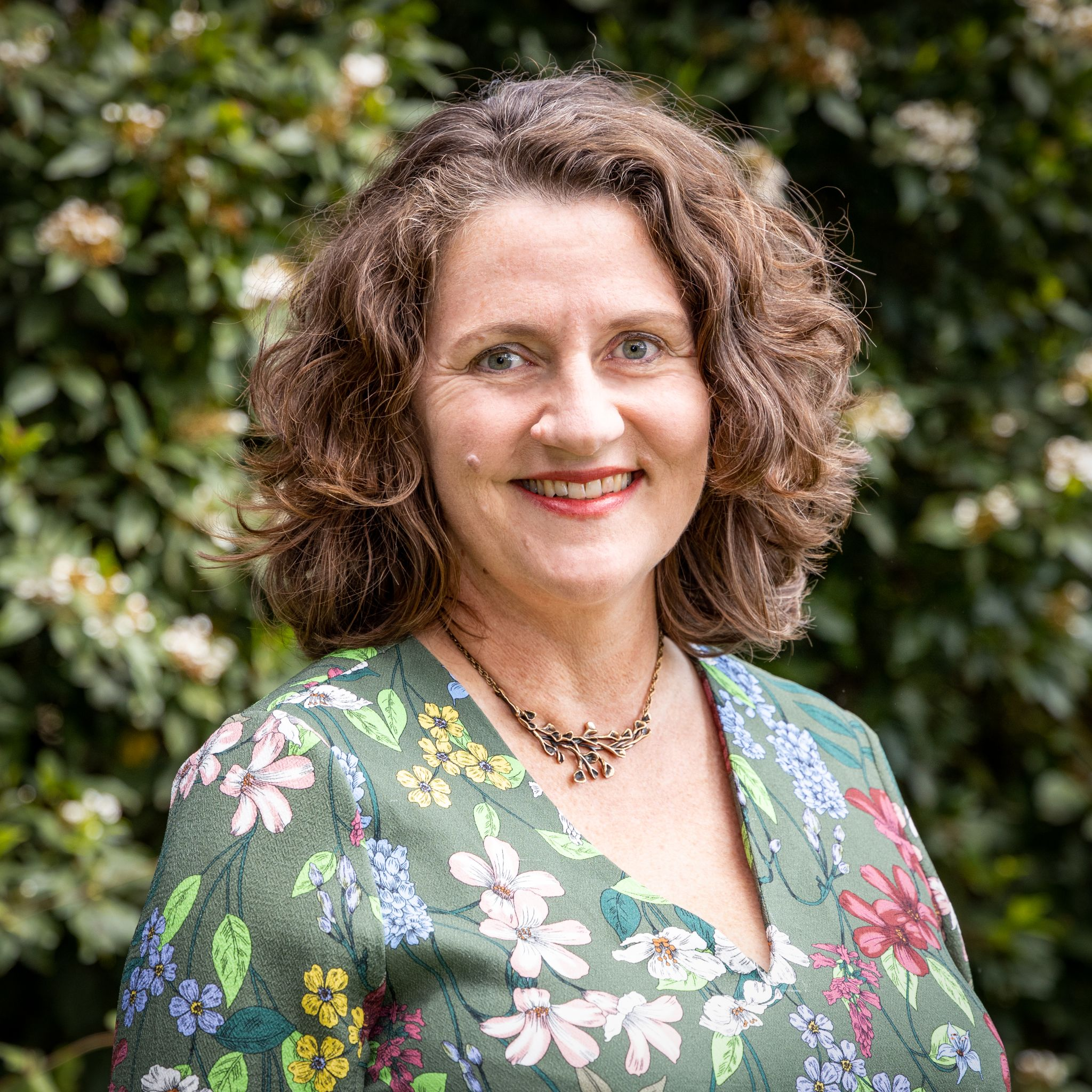
Christine Erbe in 2020

Christine Erbe is a German-Australian physicist specializing in underwater acoustics. She is a professor in the School of Earth and Planetary Sciences and director of the Centre for Marine Science and Technology (CMST)—both at Curtin University in Perth, Western Australia. Erbe is known for her research on acoustic masking in marine mammals, investigating how man-made underwater noise interferes with animal acoustic communication.

== Early life and education ==
Erbe grew up in Herdecke, North Rhine Westphalia, Germany, where she attended the Friedrich Harkort Gymnasium. She studied physics at Technische Universität Dortmund, graduating in 1993. Her Master of Science thesis entitled "Development and Test of Beam Position and Intensity Monitors for the DELTA Linear Electron Accelerator" was undertaken at the Dortmunder Elektronenspeicherring Anlage (DELTA). Erbe joined the Department of Geophysics at the University of British Columbia, Vancouver, British Columbia, Canada as a PhD student, graduating in 1997. She studied underwater noise emission by icebreakers in the Canadian Arctic, the potential interference of this noise with acoustic communication in beluga whales, and the auditory abilities of beluga whales to detect the sounds of conspecifics in ambient Arctic noise. Erbe collaborated with Vancouver Aquarium on behavioural hearing tests, measuring audiograms and masked hearing thresholds in beluga whales. Her Ph.D. thesis entitled "The Masking of Beluga Whale (Delphinapterus leucas) Vocalizations by Icebreaker Noise" was supervised by David M. Farmer, John K. Ford, and Matthew J. Yedlin. Increasingly interested in teaching physics to students at all levels, Erbe further obtained a Graduate Diploma in Education (Senior Years) from Queensland University of Technology, Brisbane, Queensland, Australia.

== Career and impact ==
Erbe completed a postdoctoral research year in 1999, at the Institute of Ocean Sciences, Fisheries and Oceans Canada, Sidney, British Columbia, Canada, studying industrial noise in the oceans and its effects on marine mammals. One particular investigation focused on underwater noise from whale-watching boats impacting southern resident killer whales.

Recognizing the need for science transfer to industry, Erbe spent several years as a private consultant in underwater noise working for offshore oil and gas companies, the maritime defense industry, and government departments tasked with regulating underwater noise. She joined JASCO Applied Sciences as director of their Australian office, Brisbane, Queensland, Australia in 2006.

In 2011, Erbe returned to academia as director of CMST, an external collaborative research center of Curtin University. In this role, Erbe is responsible for the center's research, development, and consulting activities; building strategic partnerships with industry and government; and supervising higher-degree-by-research students. Under her leadership, CMST specializes in underwater acoustics, sound measurement and modelling, marine soundscapes, passive acoustic monitoring of marine fauna and human activities, and the effects of underwater noise. CMST works closely with offshore industries, maritime defense, and government.

Erbe's research is increasingly featured in the media; e.g., her work on underwater sounds emitted by recreational swimmers, kayakers, and scuba divers, the first description of the sounds of southern pilot whales including mimicry of killer whale calls, and why healthy oceans need to be quieter. She has also participated in educational media programs.

Erbe chaired the Animal Bioacoustics Technical Committee of the Acoustical Society of America (2015–2018). She served on the awards committee for the Herman Medwin Prize in Acoustical Oceanography (2016–2018). She chaired the international conference series on The Effects of Noise on Aquatic Life (2014–2019). She was a member of the steering committee for an International Quiet Ocean Experiment (2010–2013). She participated in the International Organization for Standardization (ISO) Technical Committee 43, Sub-Committee 1, Working Group 55 on standardizing underwater noise measurements of vessels (2010–2016). She served on the Commission of Independent Scientific Experts (Kommission unabhängiger wissenschaftlicher Sachverständiger), Bundesministerium für Umwelt, Naturschutz und nukleare Sicherheit, Germany, advising on underwater noise in the Southern Ocean (2015–2021).

=== Awards and honors ===
Erbe was elected Fellow of the Acoustical Society of America in 2016.

== Selected works ==
- Erbe, Christine; Marley, Sarah A.; Schoeman, Renée P.; Smith, Joshua N.; Trigg, Leah E.; Embling, Clare Beth (11 October 2019). "The Effects of Ship Noise on Marine Mammals—A Review". Frontiers in Marine Science. 6: 606. doi:10.3389/fmars.2019.00606. hdl:10026.1/18044. ISSN 2296-7745. S2CID 204027700.
- Erbe, Christine; Dähne, Michael; Gordon, Jonathan; Herata, Heike; Houser, Dorian S.; Koschinski, Sven; Leaper, Russell; McCauley, Robert; Miller, Brian; Müller, Mirjam; Murray, Anita; et al. (6 November 2019). "Managing the Effects of Noise From Ship Traffic, Seismic Surveying and Construction on Marine Mammals in Antarctica". Frontiers in Marine Science. 6: 647. doi:10.3389/fmars.2019.00647. hdl:10023/18861. ISSN 2296-7745. S2CID 207759452.
- Erbe, Christine; Reichmuth, Colleen; Cunningham, Kane; Lucke, Klaus; Dooling, Robert (2016). "Communication masking in marine mammals: A review and research strategy". Marine Pollution Bulletin. 103 (1–2): 15–38. Bibcode:2016MarPB.103...15E. doi:10.1016/j.marpolbul.2015.12.007. hdl:20.500.11937/33503. PMID 26707982.
- Erbe, Christine; Verma, Arti; McCauley, Robert; Gavrilov, Alexander; Parnum, Iain (2015). "The marine soundscape of the Perth Canyon". Progress in Oceanography. 137: 38–51. Bibcode:2015PrOce.137...38E. doi:10.1016/j.pocean.2015.05.015. hdl:20.500.11937/10794.
- Williams, Rob; Erbe, Christine; Ashe, Erin; Beerman, Amber; Smith, Jodi (2014). "Severity of killer whale behavioral responses to ship noise: A dose–response study". Marine Pollution Bulletin. 79 (1–2): 254–260. Bibcode:2014MarPB..79..254W. doi:10.1016/j.marpolbul.2013.12.004. PMID 24373666.
- Erbe, Christine; Williams, Rob; Sandilands, Doug; Ashe, Erin (5 March 2014). Deng, Z. Daniel (ed.). "Identifying Modeled Ship Noise Hotspots for Marine Mammals of Canada's Pacific Region". PLOS ONE. 9 (3) e89820. Bibcode:2014PLoSO...989820E. doi:10.1371/journal.pone.0089820. ISSN 1932-6203. PMC 3943851. PMID 24598866.
- Erbe, Christine; MacGillivray, Alexander; Williams, Rob (2012). "Mapping cumulative noise from shipping to inform marine spatial planning". The Journal of the Acoustical Society of America. 132 (5): EL423–EL428. Bibcode:2012ASAJ..132L.423E. doi:10.1121/1.4758779. hdl:20.500.11937/30500. ISSN 0001-4966. PMID 23145705.
- Erbe, Christine (2009). "Underwater noise from pile driving in Moreton Bay, Qld". Acoustics Australia. 37 (3): 87–92.
- Erbe, Christine (2008). "Critical ratios of beluga whales ( Delphinapterus leucas ) and masked signal duration". The Journal of the Acoustical Society of America. 124 (4): 2216–2223. Bibcode:2008ASAJ..124.2216E. doi:10.1121/1.2970094. ISSN 0001-4966. PMID 19062860.
- Erbe, Christine; King, Andrew R. (2008). "Automatic detection of marine mammals using information entropy". The Journal of the Acoustical Society of America. 124 (5): 2833–2840. Bibcode:2008ASAJ..124.2833E. doi:10.1121/1.2982368. ISSN 0001-4966. PMID 19045771.
- Erbe, Christine (2002). "Underwater noise of whale-watching boats and potential effects on killer whales (Orcinus orca), based on an acoustic impact model". Marine Mammal Science. 18 (2): 394–418. Bibcode:2002MMamS..18..394E. doi:10.1111/j.1748-7692.2002.tb01045.x. ISSN 0824-0469.
- Erbe, Christine; Farmer, David M. (2000). "Zones of impact around icebreakers affecting beluga whales in the Beaufort Sea". The Journal of the Acoustical Society of America. 108 (3): 1332–40. Bibcode:2000ASAJ..108.1332E. doi:10.1121/1.1288938. PMID 11008834.
- Erbe, Christine (2000). "Detection of whale calls in noise: Performance comparison between a beluga whale, human listeners, and a neural network". The Journal of the Acoustical Society of America. 108 (1): 297–303. Bibcode:2000ASAJ..108..297E. doi:10.1121/1.429465. ISSN 0001-4966. PMID 10923893.
- Erbe, C.; Farmer, D.M. (1998). "Masked hearing thresholds of a beluga whale (Delphinapterus leucas) in icebreaker noise". Deep Sea Research Part II: Topical Studies in Oceanography. 45 (7): 1373–1388. Bibcode:1998DSRII..45.1373E. doi:10.1016/S0967-0645(98)00027-7.
