= Judge Dooling =

Judge Dooling may refer to:

- John Francis Dooling Jr. (1908–1981), judge of the United States District Court for the Eastern District of New York
- Maurice Timothy Dooling (1860–1924), judge of the United States District Court for the Northern District of California
