= Novell, Inc. v. Reimerdes =

Novell v. Reimerdes
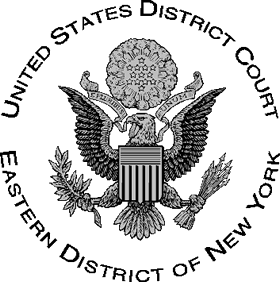
- Court: United States District Court for the Eastern District of New York
- Full case name: Novell v. Reimerdes
- Decided: August 10, 1994
- Citation: 1:93-cv-04404-CPS-JMA

Court membership
- Judge sitting: Charles Proctor Sifton

Novell, Inc. v. Reimerdes (E.D.N.Y. 1993) was a federal civil action, "inter alia", under the Copyright and Trademark Laws of the United States.

An injunction was ordered against the distribution of Novell NetWare, a LAN operating system software or NOS, a software package that allowed early PCs to network.

The Plaintiff sought a claim against Defendants for injunctive and monetary relief pursuant to 17 U.S.C §§ 502 through 505.

== Details ==
The plaintiff, Novell, Inc., a multinational software and services company headquartered in Provo, Utah, successfully sought a temporary restraining order (ex parte) against the defendants claiming that they operated a pirate bulletin board system (BBS) that distributed copyrighted computer software programs over telephone wires outfitted with modems.

Initially, it was assumed that defendant, Carl Reimerdes was the primary infringer, with initial attempts around September 27, 1993 to serve him a summons failed. It was later determined that his son, Shawn Reimerdes, was indeed the system operator (SysOp) of the Harmony Skates Bulletin board system, and that Carl Reimerdes had no knowledge of how to operate a computer less a pirate bulletin board system. Shawn Reimerdes was later amended to the complaint and was served a summons while exiting his high school in Queens, New York.

=== Copyright claim ===
Novell shows in a declaration of Drew Briggs document, Exhibits "A", "B", "C", "D", "E" and "F" that copies of the following software products were downloaded from the defendant's BBS: "NetWare 4.0" ("A"), "NetWare 4.0 Main Server License" ("B"), "NetWare 286-Object" ("C"), "NetWare 3.11" ("D"), "NetWare 286 - Source" ("E"), "NetWare Lite" ("F").

=== Trademark claim ===
Novell has a federal trademark registration (No. 1,328,271) for its "NETWARE" trademark, (No. 1,338,892) for its "NOVELL" trademark and (No. 1,350,417) for its "NOVELL" design trademark.

== Procedural history ==
=== Judgement ===
The case was closed on July 27, 1994.

On August 10, 1994, was the consent judgement of permanent injunction and dismissal for Novell, Inc. against Shawn Reimerdes. The action is dismissed against the "Doe" defendants (signed by Judge Charles P. Sifton). Carl Reimerdes is to pay plaintiff $80,000.00; the defendants are not to infringe on plaintiff's copyrights in any way, and the $10,000.00 bond is dismissed. The order is binding against the minor defendant, Shawn Reimerdes. due to his father's approval of same. The action is dismissed without prejudice.

=== Novell ===
Novell boasted 65 percent of the market for network operating systems in 1992, when networking was the fastest growing segment of the computer industry. Novell's revenues peaked at $1.63 billion in 1995.

The inclusion of networking as a core system component in Windows 95, Linux, OS/2 and all subsequent major desktop PC operating systems would render the specific third-party software manufactured by the plaintiff increasingly irrelevant and obsolete in the years after this case was closed. Microsoft's Windows 3.1, superseded in 1995, would be the last to not include basic networking capability as a standard feature.

A similar fate met the deployment of dial-up bulletin board systems, which reached their peak in 1995 only to be supplanted by new, upstart Internet service providers. The new, Internet-aware desktop operating systems offered already-bundled clients for the most common Internet services, allowing dial-up Internet to become a household commodity by the late 1990s while the BBS community withered.

=== Harmony Skates BBS ===
The defendant operated the "pirate" bulletin board system called, "Harmony Skates BBS" which ran PCBoard, under the handle, SkaTeMasTeR.

This BBS was one of the world's central distribution points for the very latest software releases called "0 day warez". At the time of the shutdown, the "elite" system was the headquarters for various underground groups such as PWA, Pirates With Attitude, ACiD, MicroPirates (MPI), etc.

The defendant was also a member of the notorious Pirates With Attitude.
