= Luis Arnaud v. Doctors Associates =

- Court: Court of Appeals for the Second Circuit
- Full case name: Luis Arnaud v. Doctors Associates, Inc. d/b/a Subway
- Decided: September 15, 2020

Luis Arnaud v. Doctors Associates, Inc. d/b/a Subway, Case No. 19-3057-cv, was a case decided by the U.S. Court of Appeals for the Second Circuit that found an arbitration clause did not apply because the terms and conditions were not reasonably conspicuous and clear on a promotional webpage.

The U.S. District Court for the Eastern District of New York found that "because the Subway webpage was relatively cluttered, did not use a conspicuous size or font for the terms and conditions link, and did not provide language informing the user that by clicking "I'M IN" the user was agreeing to anything other than the receipt of a coupon, the user would not have been on inquiry notice of the arbitration provision."

The ruling was appealed, and the Court of Appeals for the Second Circuit affirmed the lower court's decision, writing, "A reasonable user would not find the terms and conditions link contained on the page to be conspicuous, since the link was at the bottom of the page, in relatively small font, and was introduced by no language other than the shorthand "T&Cs." A reasonable user would therefore not recognize that by clicking "I'M IN" he agreed to be bound by those terms and conditions."

== Background ==
In October 2016 Luis Arnaud visited the Subway sandwich restaurant and made a purchase. The receipt from Arnaud's meal stated that Arnaud could get "a discount/free item" if he took an electronic survey following his visit. Arnaud took the survey, which asked him for personal information including his telephone number and ZIP code. Arnaud states that he provided his mobile phone number in order to receive a discounted or free item, but insists that he never consented to receiving promotional text messages from Subway. Arnaud subsequently received hundreds of text messages from the restaurant.

Subway contends that Arnaud signed up to receive text offers from Subway, and that he "reaffirmed his assent" via text message. The promotional webpage included two links, one labelled "T&Cs" and the other labelled "Privacy." Clicking on the link labelled "T&Cs" was taken to a document titled "TERMS AND CONDITIONS."

In September 2019 Arnaud filed suite in U.S. District Court for the Eastern District of New York alleging violations of the Telephone Consumer Protection Act. Subway moved to compel arbitration of the dispute, arguing that "Arnaud had agreed to arbitrate any claims against Subway at the moment he entered his phone number on a promotional page of Subway’s website and then clicked a button labeled "I'M IN" in order to receive a free sandwich." Subway claimed the action "constituted assent to the terms and conditions contained on a separate webpage that was accessible via a hyperlink on the promotional page."

The District Court denied the motion because "no arbitration agreement existed between the parties since the terms and conditions were not reasonably clear and conspicuous on the promotional page itself." Subway appealed arguing that Judge Nicholas Garaufis applied the wrong standard in evaluating whether the terms and conditions were reasonably clear and conspicuous to Arnaud; and ... that Arnaud did not provide sufficient evidence, in the form of an affidavit or otherwise, to create a factual dispute over whether he manifested his assent to the terms and conditions."
