= LaShann DeArcy Hall =

American judge (born 1970)

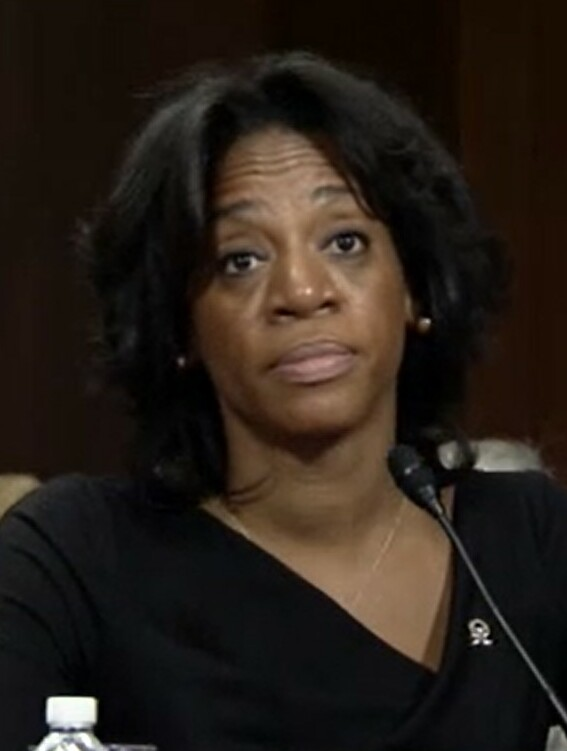
- DeArcy Hall in 2015

Judge of the United States District Court for the Eastern District of New York
- Incumbent
- Assumed office November 17, 2015
- Appointed by: Barack Obama
- Preceded by: Nicholas Garaufis

Personal details
- Born: LaShann Moutique Jones; 1970 (age 55–56) Hollywood, California
- Spouse: Courtney Hall (died 2021)
- Education: Antioch College (BA); Howard University (JD)

Military service
- Allegiance: United States
- Branch/service: United States Air Force
- Years of service: 1995–1997
- Rank: Senior Airman

LaShann Moutique DeArcy Hall (née LaShann Moutique Jones; born in 1970) is a United States district judge of the United States District Court for the Eastern District of New York.

== Biography ==
=== Education & military service ===
DeArcy Hall received a Bachelor of Arts degree from Antioch College in 1992. She received a Juris Doctor magna cum laude, in 2000 from Howard University School of Law. She served in the United States Air Force, from 1995 to 1997.

=== Early career ===
After graduating from university, DeArcy Hall worked many jobs in the service industry to pay off her student loans. From 1992 to 1993 she was a waitress at Bukom Cafe in Washington, DC. In 1993 she was an administrative employee at a temporary employment agency and later was a scheduler for Congressman Floyd Flake of New York. From 1993 to 1994 she was a waitress at Olive Tree Cafe in New York City. In 1994 she was a Conversational English Teacher at an English language school in Seoul, South Korea. From 1994 to 1997 she was a waitress at SOB's in New York City and at the Grand Hyatt Hotel in Washington, DC.

=== Legal & political career ===
In 1998 she was a judicial intern for Judge Sheila Tillerson Adams of Maryland. She worked as an associate at the law firm of Cravath, Swaine & Moore, from 2000 to 2005 and at the law firm of Gibson, Dunn & Crutcher, from 2005 to 2010. She was formerly a partner at the law firm of Morrison & Foerster where she served as a commercial litigation trial lawyer. She served as a Commissioner on the New York State Joint Commission on Public Ethics from 2012 to 2014. From 2011 to 2015, she served as a commissioner of the New York City Taxi and Limousine Commission.

=== Federal judicial service ===
On November 12, 2014, President Barack Obama nominated DeArcy Hall to serve as a United States district judge of the United States District Court for the Eastern District of New York, to the seat vacated by Judge Nicholas Garaufis, who assumed senior status on October 1, 2014. On December 16, 2014, her nomination was returned to the President due to the sine die adjournment of the 113th Congress. On January 7, 2015, President Obama renominated her to the same position. She received a hearing before the United States Senate Judiciary Committee on May 6, 2015. On June 4, 2015, her nomination was reported out of committee by a voice vote. On November 16, 2015, the United States Senate confirmed her nomination by a 93–1 vote. She received her judicial commission on November 17, 2015.

As of August 2026, DeArcy Hall is overseeing a sports bribery and game-rigging case involving the NBA.

== Personal life ==
DeArcy Hall was married to former NFL player Courtney Hall until his death in 2021.

== See also ==
- List of African-American federal judges
- List of African-American jurists

Legal offices
| Preceded by Nicholas Garaufis | Judge of the United States District Court for the Eastern District of New York; 2015–present | Incumbent |
