= Erbe =

Erbe may refer to:

== People ==
- Bonnie Erbé (born 1954), American journalist and television host
- Christine Erbe, German-Australian physicist
- Eugen Edmund Eduard Erbe (1847–1908), Baltic German politician, former mayor of Reval (now Tallinn)
- Joan Erbe (1926–2014), Baltimore painter and sculptor
- Kathryn Erbe (born 1966), American actress
- Norman A. Erbe (1919–2000), 35th Governor of Iowa

== Places ==
- Erbè, a comune (municipality) in the Province of Verona in Italy
- Piazza delle Erbe, Verona, a square in Verona, northern Italy

== Other ==
- Das Erbe, a 1935 Nazi propaganda movie
