= Jasco =

JASCO may refer to:

- JASCO Applied Sciences, an underwater acoustics consulting service
- Joint assault signal company, a United States military unit in World War 2
