= JASCO Applied Sciences =

Underwater acoustics scientific consulting firm

- Formerly: JASCO Research Ltd.
- Type: Private
- Industry: Engineering and Technical Services
- Founded: Victoria, British Columbia Canada (1981)
- Founder: Joseph Arnold Scrimger
- Headquarters: Halifax, Nova Scotia, Canada
- Number of locations: 7 (2022)
- Area served: Worldwide
- Key people: Scott Carr (CEO); David Hannay (CSO); Roberto Racca (CCO)
- Website: www.jasco.com

JASCO Applied Sciences is a scientific consulting firm, that supplies services and equipment related to underwater acoustics. JASCO operates from 7 international locations and provides services to the oil and gas, marine construction, energy, renewable energy, fisheries, maritime transport and defence sectors. The head office is located in Halifax, NS Canada. JASCO employs acousticians, bioacousticians, physicists, marine mammal scientists, engineers, technologists, and project managers.

== Services ==
=== Ocean systems engineering ===
JASCO designs and manufactures small and large ocean monitoring systems. JASCO was responsible for the $9.5M Boundary Pass Underwater Listening Station commissioned by Transport Canada. The listening station is a cabled observatory in the Salish Sea completed in June 2020.

=== Underwater sound monitoring ===
The firm deploys calibrated sound recorders to measure underwater sound levels.

Projects may be long-term, wide-area acoustic monitoring programs[7][8] or short-term measurements of industrial sources or marine vessels. The data collected are then analysed to determine the acoustic signature of the sound sources, characterize the ambient noise conditions at the measurement site,[9] or detect and identify marine mammal vocalizations.[10][11][12] To determine the environmental impacts, JASCO measures underwater anthropogenic noise from many sources, including:

- Pile driving and offshore construction for marine terminals, bridges, wind turbines, etc.
- Seismic survey operations
- Marine vessels
- High-frequency sonar such as side-scan sonar, multibeam sonar, and echosounders
- Tidal energy devices

=== Predictive modelling studies ===
The firm also conducts numerical modelling studies to predict the underwater field of noise sources required for industrial projects' environmental impact assessments. The loud sounds produced by pile driving and seismic surveys can disturb and even injure marine mammals and fish. The results of underwater acoustic modelling are commonly expressed as safety radii (or exclusion zone radii) that are used by marine mammal observers during operations to ensure animals are not exposed to harmful levels of noise. Results are also provided as contour maps of the sound levels around the noise source. These maps can be used to assess or mitigate the impacts of the noise on marine mammals, fish, and other aquatic wildlife.

JASCO also performs modelling of aquatic species’ movement and behaviour, exposing simulated marine animals (called animats) to 3-D modelled sound fields. Unique movement and behaviour parameters are determined for each species from animal behaviour studies to simulate how the animals behave and move within the environment. The acoustic exposure of each animal is determined and compared to the regulated exposure criteria to predict potential environmental impacts of an acoustic source.

=== Acoustic software development ===
JASCO develops scientifically based software for the analysis and display of underwater acoustic data, including automated detection algorithms for marine mammal species and anthropogenic noise sources.

== Notable projects ==
Notable projects JASCO was/is involved in:

- Boundary Pass Underwater Listening Station commissioned by Transport Canada, 2020+
- Underwater Warfare Suite Upgrade (UWSU) for Department of National Defence (Canada), 2018+
- Atlantic Deepwater Ecosystem Observatory Network (ADEON) with University of New Hampshire, 2017+
- Vineyard Wind 1 and Vineyard Wind South — acoustic impact assessments, 2017+
- Port of Vancouver Enhancing Cetacean Habitat and Observation (ECHO) Program — Monitoring and analysis for various projects, 2015+
- Port of Vancouver Roberts Bank Terminal 2 construction project — Measurement, analysis, and modelling studies, 2014+
- South Fork Wind Farm — Underwater acoustic assessment, 2019
- Pattullo Bridge Replacement — underwater acoustic modelling, 2018
- Mary River Mine — determining effects to marine mammals from shipping noise, 2018
- Underwater Listening Station in the Strait of Georgia for Port of Vancouver — part of the VENUS ocean observatory, 2015-2018
- Tappan Zee Bridge Construction — underwater noise modeling and monitoring, 2016-2017
- Block Island Wind Farm — underwater acoustic measurement and monitoring, 2015-2016
- Chukchi Sea Environmental Studies Program (CSESP) — large-scale acoustic monitoring and analysis, 2009–2016
- LNG Canada Export Terminal — underwater acoustic assessment, 2015
- Hywind Scotland — analysis of floating turbine acoustic signature, 2011

== Products ==
=== OceanObserver acquisition and processing system ===
The OceanObserver is an underwater acoustic data recorder that processes sound data onboard in order to detect marine mammal vocalization. This removes the necessity to transfer the raw acoustic data from the recorder, reducing demands on communication bandwidth.

The OceanObserver is used in numerous instruments, including robotic vehicles (e.g. underwater gliders), spar buoys, real-time monitoring buoys, research buoys, and cabled underwater observatories. Typical projects for these instruments include:

- Real-time pile driving monitoring: sending peak sound pressure levels to shore to ensure regulated threshold levels are not exceeded.
- Marine mammal detection and avoidance: Detecting and localizing marine mammals over vast areas to allow alerting nearby vessels or operations to prevent collision or disturbance. For example, marine mammal detection has been used to locate North Atlantic right whales in the Gulf of St. Lawrence and enable temporary closures of affected areas.
- Quantifying and mitigating vessel noise: Semi-permanent seabed monitoring stations, connected to shore by undersea cable, sending vessel sound source measurements to determine how to reduce impacts from vessel underwater noise pollution.

=== AMAR G4 underwater sound recorder ===
Two AMAR G4s being deployed near Kitimat, BC, each with a hydrophone surrounded by a yellow shroud to reduce flow-induced noise over the hydrophone

The successor to the AMAR G3, AMAR G4 (Autonomous Multichannel Acoustic Recorder Generation 4) is an underwater acoustic and oceanographic data recorder with 10 TB of removable SD memory cards and Wi-Fi communications. It consists of recording electronics housed inside a watertight pressure housing. The AMAR can be connected to up to 16 hydrophones and up to 7 oceanographic sensors (e.g., dissolved oxygen, salinity, acidity, temperature).

=== AMAR G3 underwater sound recorder ===
The Autonomous Multichannel Acoustic Recorder Generation 3 (AMAR G3) is an underwater acoustic and oceanographic data recorder consisting of recording electronics housed inside a watertight pressure housing. The AMAR can be connected to up to 8 hydrophones sampled at rates up to 128 kHz.

Several AMARs were used on the Strait of Georgia branch of the VENUS ocean observatory, an observatory that provides publicly available underwater sound recordings.
