= C. J. Goodell =

American judge

Council Julian Goodell
- Goodell in 1929

Associate Justice of the California Court of Appeal, First District
- In office January 2, 1945 – December 31, 1953
- Appointed by: Governor Earl Warren
- Preceded by: Homer R. Spence

Personal details
- Born: February 18, 1885 San Francisco, California, U.S.
- Died: September 17, 1967 (aged 82) San Rafael, California, U.S.
- Spouses: Ethel Segale (m. 1912; died 1958) Lucie Reincke (m. 1960; died 1967)
- Education: Golden Gate University School of Law (LL.B.)

Council Julian Goodell (February 18, 1885 – September 17, 1967), also called Julian Goodell, was an American attorney and jurist who served as an associate justice of the District Court of Appeal of California from 1945 to 1953.

== Early life and education ==
Born in San Francisco, California, the youngest of five children of Council Goodell, a boarding house keeper and his wife Catherine (née McNeeve.) Goodell, the grandson of Irish immigrants on his mother's side, was raised a Roman Catholic in the working class area located South of Market. Goodell's father died when he was six, and he worked as a clerk to help support the family. He was educated at Sacred Heart College (now Sacred Heart Cathedral Preparatory) and the California Institute of Mechanical Arts (now Lick-Wilmerding High School). While working as a clerk at a lumber yard, and later as a stenographer he attended the YMCA Law College (now Golden Gate University School of Law.)

After passing the (then completely oral) bar examination he was admitted to the practice of law on November 18, 1908 (although Goodell would not formally receive his law degree until September 1909).

== Legal career ==
After graduation, Goodell lived for a time in Coronado, California, before in 1911 being appointed Town Attorney for Suisun City, California, representing the town before the courts and the Railroad Commission of California (now the California Public Utilities Commission.) He returned to live in San Francisco in 1913.

== Superior Court ==
Following a career in private practice, Goodell, a Republican, was in May 1928 appointed to the San Francisco Superior Court bench by Governor C. C. Young; he was elected in his own right in 1930 and was re-elected in 1936 and 1942 His tenure on the court included several terms as a pro tem Justice on the District Court of Appeal as well as service as presiding judge of the Superior Court bench.

== District Court of Appeal ==
On January 2, 1945, Governor Earl Warren appointed Goodell an associate justice of the District Court of Appeal, First Appellate District, Division Two in place of Homer R. Spence who was elevated to the California Supreme Court on the same day. The First District then heard appeals from the trial courts of Alameda, Contra Costa, Marin, Monterey, San Benito, San Francisco, San Mateo, Santa Clara and Santa Cruz counties. Goodell was retained by the voters in 1946 for the balance of a 12-year term expiring in January 1957. He would hold office until December 31, 1953, when he retired.

== Later years ==
Following his service on the court, Goodell returned to practice, taking a few cases to the California Courts of Appeal and one to the California Supreme Court. He was awarded an honorary Doctor of Laws by his legal alma mater in 1955. In August 1957, he was named the first Chairman of the San Francisco Commission on Equal Employment Opportunity. He was a member of the American Bar Association, the Bohemian Club and the Commonwealth Club. At San Andreas, California, on July 24, 1912, he married Ethel Segale, they had one son; she died in 1958. After her death, Goodell married Lucie Reincke in Los Angeles on December 29, 1960, she died in January 1967. A resident of San Francisco's Sunset District during his years on the bench, Goodell moved to Pacific Heights after the death of his first wife. Justice Goodell died in San Rafael, California, on June 17, 1967, and was survived by his son, Julian. Goodell is buried in Holy Cross Cemetery in Colma, California.

Legal offices
| Preceded by Homer R. Spence | Associate Justice of the California Court of Appeal, First District; 1945–1953 | Succeeded by |
