= Sam Sifton =

American journalist

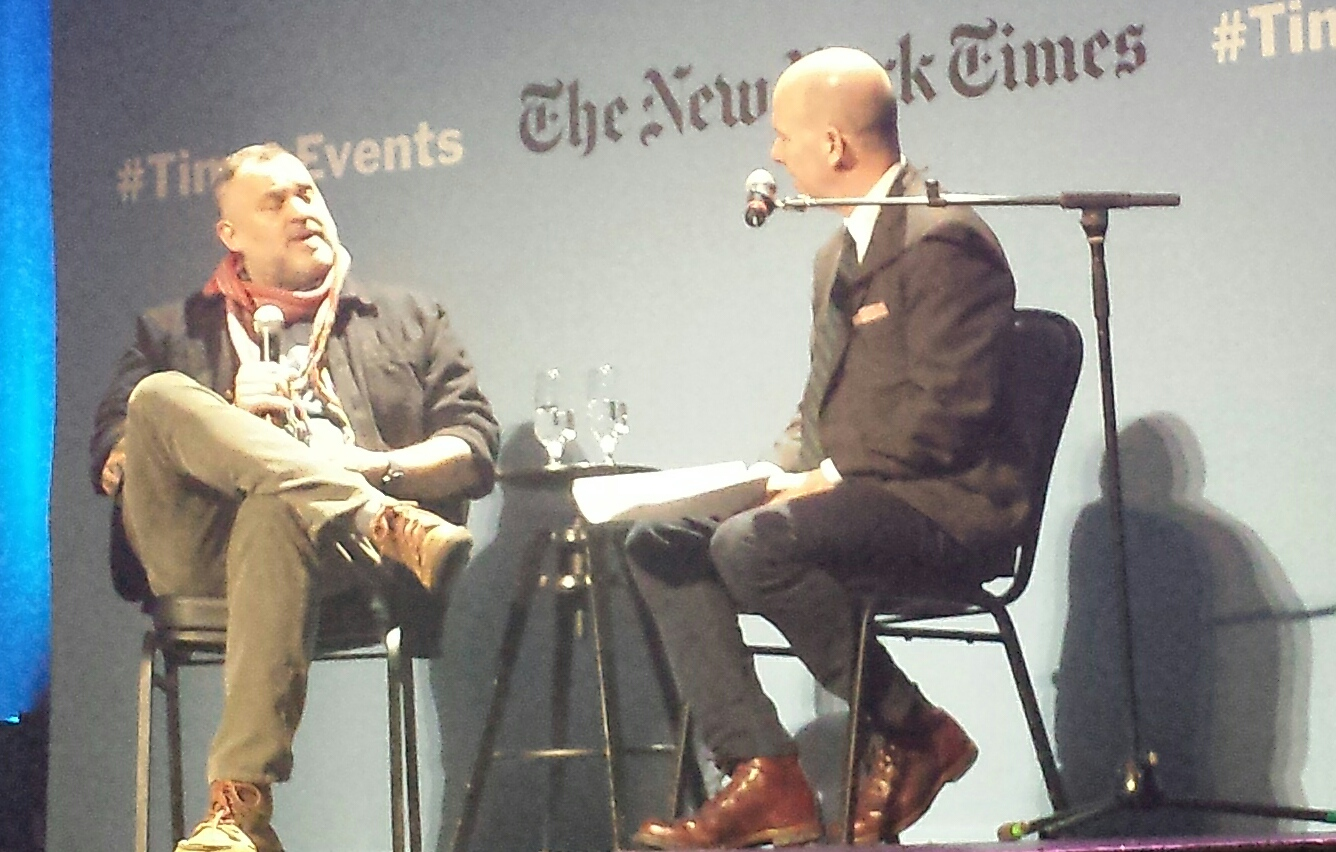
- Sam Sifton, right, in 2018.
- Born: June 5, 1966 (age 60)
- Occupations: food editor, national news editor, restaurant critic, cultural news editor, journalist, author
- Notable credit(s): The New York Times, Talk magazine; New York Press (publications); A Field Guide to the Yettie (book)
- Spouse: Tina Fallon
- Family: Hon. Charles Proctor Sifton (father); Elisabeth Sifton (mother)

Sam Sifton (born June 5, 1966) is an American journalist and assistant managing editor at The New York Times. He previously served as the paper's food editor. Sifton has also worked as deputy dining editor (2001); dining editor (2001–2004); deputy culture editor (2004–2005), culture editor (2005–2009), restaurant critic (2009–2011), and national editor (2011–2014).

== Early life ==
Sifton was born on June 5, 1966, to the Hon. Charles Proctor Sifton, a senior district judge of the United States District Court for the Eastern District of New York, and Elisabeth Sifton, a senior vice president at Farrar, Straus & Giroux and author of The Serenity Prayer (2003). His maternal grandfather was the theologian Reinhold Niebuhr and his maternal grandmother was Ursula Niebuhr, the author of Remembering Reinhold Niebuhr (2001) and founder of the Barnard College Religion Department.

Sifton graduated magna cum laude from Harvard College with an A.B. degree in history and literature in 1988.

== Career ==
Sifton began his journalism career as assistant editor for American Heritage magazine in 1988. From 1990 to 1994, he taught social studies in the New York City public school system.

Sifton held a number of positions at the weekly New York Press during his tenure there from 1990 to 1998, including restaurant critic, contributing editor, senior editor, media critic, and managing editor.

Sifton was a founding editor of Talk in 1998 before coming to the Times in 2001.

In October 2009, Sifton succeeded Frank Bruni as restaurant critic for the Times. Sifton's last review as restaurant critic was published October 11, 2011. He was succeeded by Pete Wells.

== Personal life ==
Sifton is married to Tina Fallon, an independent theatre producer, and resides in Brooklyn. They have two children.

== Works ==
- Sifton, Sam, Malosh, D., & New York Times Company. (2021). The New York Times Cooking No Recipe Recipes. New York: Ten Speed Press. ISBN 1529109833. OCLC 1250363553
- Sifton, Sam (2000). A Field Guide to the Yettie: Young, Enterepreneurial Technocrats. New York: Hyperion. ISBN 9780747556138. OCLC 59487866.
- Sifton, Sam (2013). Thanksgiving: How To Cook It Well. New York: Random House. ISBN 9780679605140. OCLC 869561516.
- Sifton, Sam (2020). See You on Sunday: A Cookbook for Family and Friends. New York: Random House. ISBN 9781400069927. OCLC 1111271503.
