= Mathew Tobriner =

American judge

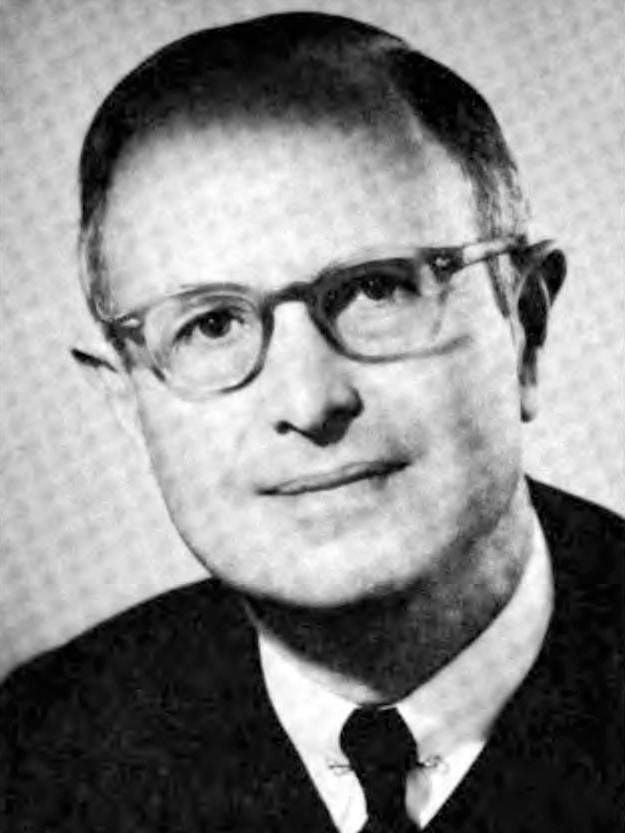
- Official portrait, 1975

Associate Justice of the California Supreme Court
- In office July 2, 1962 – January 20, 1982
- Appointed by: Pat Brown
- Preceded by: Maurice T. Dooling Jr.
- Succeeded by: Cruz Reynoso

Associate Justice of the California Court of Appeal, First District
- In office 1959 – July 1, 1962
- Appointed by: Pat Brown

Personal details
- Born: Mathew Oscar Tobriner; April 2, 1904 San Francisco, California, U.S.
- Died: April 7, 1982 (aged 78) San Francisco, California, U.S.
- Spouse: Rosabelle Rose (m. 1939)
- Education: Stanford University (BA, MA); Harvard University (LLB); University of California, Berkeley (JSD)

Mathew Oscar Tobriner (April 2, 1904 – April 7, 1982) was an American lawyer and law professor who served as an associate justice of the California Supreme Court from 1962 to 1982.

== Early life and education ==
A native of San Francisco, Tobriner was educated at Lowell High School and was a member of its famed Lowell Forensic Society, the nation's oldest high school debate team. He attended Stanford University, and in 1924 received his A.B. degree with Phi Beta Kappa honors, and the next year his M.A. In 1927, he graduated from Harvard Law School magna cum laude and Order of the Coif with a LL.B. In April 1928, he was admitted before the California Bar. He continued his graduate studies at the University of California, Berkeley, where he was awarded a Doctor of Juridical Science in 1932.

== Legal and judicial career ==
After law school, Tobriner entered private practice and specialized in labor law. In 1928, he founded the firm of Tobriner, Lazarus, Brundage & Neyhart, in San Francisco and Los Angeles where he represented the American Federation of Labor and various unions for over 25 years, except for stints working at public agencies.

Tobriner was active in Democratic Party politics. From 1932 to 1936, during the New Deal administration of President Franklin D. Roosevelt, Tobriner served as chief attorney in the solicitor's office of the United States Department of Agriculture. In 1948, he was state vice-chair of President Harry Truman's re-election campaign. In May 1950, he was northern California chair of the campaign of Congresswoman Helen Gahagan Douglas for the United States Senate.

From 1958 to 1959, Tobriner taught as an associate professor at the University of California, Hastings College of the Law. In 1959, Governor Pat Brown appointed Tobriner as an associate justice of the California Court of Appeal for the First District.

In June 1962, Governor Brown elevated Tobriner to Associate Justice of the state Supreme Court to fill the unexpired term of Maurice T. Dooling Jr., who had resigned. In November 1974, Tobriner stood for re-election and was retained. In the 1960s, Tobriner was part of the liberal majority on the court that included Chief Justice Roger Traynor, Raymond L. Sullivan, Raymond E. Peters, and Stanley Mosk. In 1976, as one of the three members on the California Commission on Judicial Appointments, Tobriner cast the deciding vote in approving the nomination of Rose Bird as the first female Chief Justice of the California Supreme Court.

=== Notable opinions ===
Tobriner's tenure on the state's high court is notable for several decisions he authored in the areas of constitutional law and civil rights, property, contracts and torts.

In 1963, Tobriner's opinion in Tunkl v. Regents of the University of California established a six-factor test to determine whether a contract relates to the "public interest," such that a contract or provision therein may be found invalid as contrary to public policy.

Tobriner's 1965 opinion in People v. Dorado, ruling that a person accused of a crime must be advised by the police of a right to remain silent and to obtain counsel, presaged the U.S. Supreme Court's Miranda v. Arizona (1966).

In 1966, Tobriner explained in Morrison v. State Board of Education that gay teachers are entitled to employment in public schools absent a "showing that an individual's homosexuality renders him unfit for the job from which he has been excluded."

In April 1975, Tobriner addressed a case arising out of a labor action. Under California law it was illegal for public employees to strike. Despite the statute, San Francisco city employees picketed city hall and shut down municipal services. After a week, Mayor Joseph Alioto and the San Francisco Board of Supervisors agreed to the strikers' demands. The city controller, however, refused to payout what he believed were illegal salaries. The California Supreme Court ordered the city controller to pay the salaries, with Tobriner's majority opinion finding that contracts secured through illegal strikes are still legally enforceable.

In 1974, Tobriner wrote the decision of Green v. Superior Court, 517 P.2d 1168, that established the doctrine of implied warranty of habitability in residential leases in California, which requires landlords to maintain leased dwellings in a habitable condition.

In 1976, Tobriner wrote the decision of Tarasoff v. Regents of the University of California, 17 Cal. 3d 425, 551 P.2d 334, 131 Cal. Rptr. 14 (Cal. 1976), the ruling that held that mental health professionals have a duty to protect individuals who are being threatened with bodily harm by a patient. He famously wrote, "...the confidential character of patient-psychotherapist communications must yield to the extent that disclosure is essential to avert danger to others. The protective privilege ends where the public peril begins ..."

Also in 1976, Tobriner also authored the majority opinion in the landmark case of Marvin v. Marvin, 557 P.2d 106 (Cal. 1976), which held that implied contracts may be found in non-marital relationships. In other words, if a couple lives together for a substantial period of time, one of the parties may be required to make payments to the other upon the dissolution of the relationship—commonly called "palimony."

In 1978, as Acting Chief Justice, Tobriner wrote the decision in the products liability case Barker v. Lull Engineering Co., 20 Cal.3d 413 (Cal. 1978), establishing a plaintiff-friendly standard by which a product might be shown to be defective either because it failed to meet ordinary consumer expectations or because the benefits of the product do not outweigh the risks inherent in its design.

Finally, Tobriner wrote the majority opinion in People v. Woody, 394 P.2d 813 (Cal. 1964), overturning a conviction for peyote use by a Native American Church member on First Amendment grounds. Weighing the asserted compelling state interest in controlling drug abuse with the Free Exercise Clause, he found that the balance favored constitutional protection of the peyote use and practice, stating:

"On the other hand, the right to free religious expression embodies a precious heritage of our history. In a mass society, which presses at every point toward conformity, the protection of a self-expression, however unique, of the individual and the group becomes ever more important. The varying current of the subcultures that flow into the mainstream of our national life give it depth and beauty. We preserve a greater value than an ancient tradition when we protect the rights of the Indians who honestly practiced an old religion in using peyote one night at a meeting in a desert hogan near Needles, California."

=== Judicial clerks ===
Tobriner had several notable law clerks. These include Jerry Brown, the son of Governor Pat Brown, who had appointed Tobriner to the Court and who was still governor when the younger Brown clerked for Tobriner. Jerry Brown would later serve as Governor of California from 1975 to 1983 and again from 2011 to 2019, and as Attorney General of California from 2007 to 2011. Another of Tobriner's law clerks, Laurence Tribe, became a professor of law at Harvard Law School and a preeminent expert on United States constitutional law. Finally, from 1964 to 1965 Richard M. Mosk clerked for Tobriner, and went on to become a justice of the California Court of Appeal.

=== Retirement ===
In January 1982, Tobriner retired from the high court and his seat was filled by Governor Jerry Brown's appointment of Cruz Reynoso. Tobriner died on April 7, 1982, in San Francisco.

== Honors and awards ==
Tobriner was awarded an honorary Doctor of Laws from both the Santa Clara University and the University of San Diego. The Hastings College of Law holds an annual lecture in Tobriner's honor. The Legal Aid Society of San Francisco, which Tobriner once led, awards an annual "Mathew O. Tobriner Public Service Award."

== Personal life ==
On May 19, 1939, Tobriner married Rosabelle Rose. They had two sons: Michael Charles Tobriner, who became an attorney in San Francisco, and Stephen Oscar Tobriner, who became a professor of architecture at the University of California. Tobriner was Jewish. Michael's son, Ben Wildman-Tobriner, is the 2007 World Aquatics Champion in 50-meter freestyle swimming and won a gold medal at the 2008 Summer Olympics.

== See also ==
- List of Jewish American jurists
- List of justices of the Supreme Court of California

== Selected publications ==
- Tobriner, Mathew O. (1961). "The Emerging Law of Social Responsibility". Santa Clara Lawyer. 1 (1): 5.
- Tobriner, Mathew O.; Grodin, Joseph R. (1967). "The Individual and the Public Service Enterprise in the New Industrial State". California Law Review. 55 (5): 1247–1283. doi:10.2307/3479329. JSTOR 3479329.

Legal offices
Preceded by Maurice T. Dooling Jr.	Associate Justice of the California Supreme Court; 1962–1982	Succeeded by Cruz Reynoso
Preceded by	Associate Justice of the California Court of Appeal, First District; 1959–1962	Succeeded by
