= Homer R. Spence =

American judge

Homer Roberts Spence

Associate Justice of the California Supreme Court
- In office January 2, 1945 – June 1, 1960
- Appointed by: Governor Earl Warren
- Preceded by: Jesse W. Curtis Sr.
- Succeeded by: Maurice T. Dooling Jr.

Associate Justice of the California Court of Appeal, First District
- In office 1930 – January 1, 1945
- Appointed by: Governor C. C. Young
- Preceded by: John T. Nourse
- Succeeded by: C. J. Goodell

Member of the California State Assembly from the 35th district district
- In office January 3, 1921 - January 3, 1927
- Preceded by: William J. Locke
- Succeeded by: Roy Bishop

Personal details
- Born: March 15, 1891 San Francisco, California, U.S.
- Died: July 1, 1973 (aged 82) Oakland, California, U.S.
- Party: Republican
- Spouse: Frances Davie Horton (m. 1952)
- Education: Stanford University (B.A.); Stanford Law School (LL.B.)

Homer Roberts Spence (March 15, 1891 – July 1, 1973) was an Associate Justice of the California Supreme Court (1945-1960) and a justice of the District Court of Appeal, First District (1930-1945).

== Biography ==
Spence was born on March 15, 1891, in San Francisco, California, and educated in the public schools, including Mastick Grammar School (class of 1904) and Alameda High School. In 1913, he graduated from Stanford University with a B.A. degree in pre-legal studies. He continued his studies at Stanford Law School, graduating in 1915 with a LL.B. degree, was admitted to the California bar, and entered private practice.

In 1920, Spence was elected as a Republican Assemblyman from Oakland's 35th district in the California State Assembly, and in January 1925 his name was considered for the position of speaker of the house. Afterwards, he served as private secretary to Governor C. C. Young, accompanying him on a fishing trip to the Yosemite Valley in June 1927. On October 3, 1927, when Spence was ready to depart the governor's office, Young appointed Spence to a seat on the Alameda County Superior Court. In September 1928, Spence ran unopposed and was elected to a new term on the superior court.

In March 1930, Governor Young elevated Spence to the Court of Appeal. In September 1930, during the next election, Spence successfully ran for a seat on the Court of Appeal, First District, with an unexpired term ending January 1933, winning over Frank Deasy, presiding judge of the San Francisco Municipal Court.

In December 1944, Governor Earl Warren appointed Spence as an associate justice of the California Supreme Court, and he began his term on January 2, 1945. Spence replaced Jesse W. Curtis Sr., who retired in December 1944. In November 1950, Spence successfully ran for re-election. While on the court, Spence was one of three Justices joining in dissent from the holding in Perez v. Sharp, in which the court held by a vote of 4 to 3 that interracial bans on marriage violated the Fourteenth Amendment to the United States Constitution and therefore were illegal in California. On June 1, 1960, Spence resigned from the high court and in his place Governor Pat Brown appointed Maurice T. Dooling Jr.

Spence died on July 1, 1973, in Oakland.

== Personal life ==
On November 15, 1952, Spence married Frances Davie Horton, a widow in San Francisco.

== See also ==
- List of justices of the Supreme Court of California

Legal offices
Preceded by Jesse W. Curtis Sr.	Associate Justice of the California Supreme Court; 1945–1960	Succeeded by Maurice T. Dooling Jr.
Preceded by John T. Nourse	Associate Justice of the California Court of Appeal, First District; 1930–1945	Succeeded by C. J. Goodell
Preceded by William J. Locke	Assemblyman from Oakland's 35th district in the California State Assembly; 1920–1926	Succeeded by Roy Bishop
