= Tunkl v. Regents of the University of California =

1963 landmark legal case in California

- Supreme Court of California

Decided Jul 9, 1963
- Full case name: Olga TUNKL, as Executrix of the Estate of Hugo TUNKL, Deceased, Plaintiff and Appellant, v. The REGENTS OF the UNIVERSITY OF CALIFORNIA, Defendant and Respondent
- Citation(s): 60 Cal.2d 92 (1963)

Case history
- Prior history: Appeal from judgment for defendant
- Subsequent history: none

Holding
- A release from future negligence liability imposed as a condition for entry to a charitable hospital is invalid as a matter of public policy, under Cal. Civ Code §1668, which prohibits exempting a person from fraud, willful injury, or violation of law in contexts that affect the public interest.

Court membership
- Chief Justice: Phil S. Gibson
- Associate Justices: Roger J. Traynor, B. Rey Schauer, Marshall F. McComb, Raymond E. Peters, Mathew Tobriner, Paul Peek

Case opinions
- Majority: Tobriner

Tunkl v. Regents of the University of California was a landmark case in California that established a persuasive six-factor test that helps guide courts to decide when a contract relates to the "public interest."

Specifically, California courts had a history of holding exculpatory liability waivers within contracts to be valid only if they did not involve the "public interest." This case history arose in relation to Cal. Civ. Code §1668, a statute that states "All contracts which have for their object, directly or indirectly, to exempt anyone from responsibility for his own fraud, or willful injury to the person or property of another, or violation of law, whether willful or negligent, are against the policy of the law." Cal. Civ. Code § 1668. At the time, it was difficult to gauge exactly what the courts meant by interpreting this statute to apply fervently to contracts "in the public interest." Tunkl helped clarify this, though there is still a debate as to how many of the six factors must be met, or whether certain factors should be read to be subservient to others.

According to Tunkl, the six factors that determine, in the instance, whether a contract relates to the public interest are: (1) It concerns a business of a type generally thought suitable for public regulation. (2) The party seeking exculpation is engaged in performing a service of great importance to the public, which is often a matter of practical necessity for some members of the public. (3) The party holds himself out as willing to perform this service for any member of the public who seeks it, or at least for any member coming within certain established standards. (4) As a result of the essential nature of the service, in the economic setting of the transaction, the party invoking exculpation possesses a decisive advantage of bargaining strength against any member of the public who seeks his services. (5) In exercising a superior bargaining power the party confronts the public with a standardized adhesion contract of exculpation, and makes no provision whereby a purchaser may pay additional reasonable fees and obtain protection against negligence. (6) Finally, as a result of the transaction, the person or property of the purchaser is placed under the control of the seller, subject to the risk of carelessness by the seller or his agents.

If a contract both meets these factors and includes liability waivers, it may be held to be invalid and unenforceable as a matter of law and policy.

== Facts ==
The University of California at Los Angeles Medical Center, a research and education hospital, admitted Hugo Tunkl for treatment of a condition related to a particular condition under study at the time. As a condition of being admitted for treatment, the hospital required that Tunkl sign a contract that included the following provision:

"RELEASE: The hospital is a nonprofit, charitable institution. In consideration of the hospital and allied services to be rendered and the rates charged therefor, the patient or his legal representative agrees to and hereby releases The Regents of the University of California, and the hospital from any and all liability for the negligent or wrongful acts or omissions of its employees, if the hospital has used due care in selecting its employees."

Tunkl signed and was admitted for treatment. He later brought suit against the Medical Center to recover damages for personal injuries alleged to have resulted from the negligence of two of his treating physicians. Mr. Tunkl died after the suit was brought, and his wife, as the executrix of his estate, was substituted as plaintiff in the action.

== Legal issue ==
When a contract including a broad release from future negligence liability is imposed as a condition for treatment at a charitable hospital, is the contract void as a matter of public policy, such that an action may be brought against the hospital for malpractice or personal injury resulting from treatment?

== Holding ==
Yes. Public policy dictates that certain waivers are void as a matter of public policy if they relate to the public interest.

The policy behind this law is straightforward, even though its application to various circumstances has been up for debate. The policy in most states, including California, is that every party entering into a contract must do so at his or her own risk, as each party is assumed to be entering the contract voluntarily and receiving due consideration as part of the bargain. Here, the court recognizes that there are some instances where a person may enter a contract less-than-voluntarily, or without receiving adequate consideration: situations in which that person needs an essential service such as medical care. The court relates this to the public interest because it is a service of a type that "each member of the public, presently or potentially, may find essential to him," which raises the possibility that "he faces, despite his economic inability to do so, the prospect of a compulsory assumption of the risk of another's negligence."

In other words, when someone needs a service, they find themselves being forced to shoulder another person's risks at their own expense, i.e. by waiving doctors from negligence liability as was done here. The Tunkl court states that this is somewhat unfair, and thus although "The public policy of this state has been, in substance, to posit the risk of negligence upon the actor; in instances in which this policy has been abandoned, it has generally been to allow or require that the risk shift to another party better or equally able to bear it, not to shift the risk to the weak bargainer." Tunkl stands for the notion that a person should not be forced to shoulder certain contractual risks, especially if those risks are of the kind that the rest of the general "public" will likely face at some point in their lives.
