= Autonomous recording unit =

Bioacoustics recording devices

An autonomous recording unit (ARU) is a self-contained audio recording device that is deployed in marine or terrestrial environments for bioacoustical monitoring. The unit is used in both marine and terrestrial environments to track the behavior of animals and monitor their ecosystems. On a terrestrial level, the ARU can detect noises coming from bird habitats and determine relative emotions that each bird conveys along with the population of the birds and the relative vulnerability of the ecosystem. The ARU can also be used to understand noises made by marine life to see how the animals' communication affects the operation of their ecosystem. When underwater, the ARU can track the sound that human made machines make and see the effect those sounds have on marine life ecosystems. Up to 44 work days can be saved through the utilization of ARU's, along with their ability to discover more species.

== Design ==
=== General overview ===
A split frequency application is used to counter the wide bandwidths that create issues. This split allows for the sampling of continuous time signals along an inclusion based bandwidth with a small number of hertz to hundreds of kilo-Hertz (kHz). One band is used for lower frequencies, below 30 kHz, while the other is used for higher frequencies, above 100 kHz. The perceived signals are then put into the hard drive for storage.

=== Broadband recording system ===
==== SDA14 platform ====
The SDA14 platform allows for signal processing in real time with a 24-bits Wideband that covers 4 analog signals. To get real time data analysis, a digital signal processor (DSP) is used with three GFlops. The data can then be distributed to different media storages alongside a programmable OEM. The system itself is autonomous with 8 to 26 volt digital converter power sources that are blended through Ethernet and serial port interfaces. The Ethernet port allows for acoustic tests while in the terrain along with extra gathered data. Meanwhile, the serial port deals with the sending back of data in real time and to send master control of the system back when submerged underwater. The channel takes up around 1.8 watts of power when recording.

==== Cetacean detection algorithm ====
Different animals experience different sensitivities to frequencies that affect their behavior. Because of this there are multiple cetacean detection algorithms.

===== High frequency cetacean =====
Highly sensitive animals like harbor porpoise generate primary signals between 115 and 145 kilohertz, which requires a large sample rate (480 kilo-samples per second) to capture strong bandwidth recordings.

===== Cetacean detector algorithm =====
Known as a click detection process, the cetacean detector algorithm was originally implemented in analog electronics to test different dolphins and porpoises in containment and in freedom. The center frequency is 130 kilohertz with a 30 kilohertz bandwidth. The pulse's envelope is tracked through a sequence of short clicks. The lower bandwidths (less than 20 kilohertz) are digitized and the frequencies shifted to be low enough for the human ear. This helps humans understand the acoustic behavior. In between clicks, acoustic behavior can be observed. Behavioral interpolation of the mammals can be inferred between inter-click periods. The system has implemented the SDA14 platform alongside DSP to get full bandwidth waveforms that holds large advantages cetacean examination.

=== Summary ===
ARU's offer large advancements in monitoring underwater acoustics due to strong signal processing and data capturing. The quality of noise is somewhat limited because of the digital and analog systems that are implemented. At the moment this system works best with porpoises, but it is rather versatile and can still be applied to other mammals such as dolphins and whales.

== Pros and cons ==
=== Pros ===
- In comparison with human observers, ARU's are much more successful at perceiving the species of animals in the area.
- ARU's permanent record cancels bias as multiple listeners can access the audio and come to a consensus
  - Can also allow for understanding patterns behind the detection of certain animals
  - Can confirm the identification of more rare species
  - Can be used to identify changes in vocalization of species over the years and for what possible reasons
- Overall good for determining anthropogenic disturbances on species' vocals and distributions over time
- Installation and removal are done in minutes with less total time needed for people to be on the scene
- Can track species that have more randomized sounds
- ARUs can have set times to record through their programming, allowing for a look at specific species

=== Cons ===
- Storage can fill up quickly and become a large cluster data that is difficult to decipher and maintain.
- Reviewing recordings is time consuming
- A recording failure can lose data.
- ARUs are expensive and require frequent check ups to replace batteries and maintain microphones.
- To cover a large area, multiple ARUs are needed as their range is limited.

== Current and future applications ==
The three main functions of ARU's include monitoring movement, biology, and animal communication in an ecosystem. With relatively frequent check-ups the ARU's can monitor at all times and measure, for instance, the owls in spring and amphibians in a later season. They can determine when certain animals live in an ecosystem and when other animals take their place.

Future bioacoustic monitoring could move into monitoring soundscapes and mapping habitats. Data processing can gather sounds from different sources for habitat monitoring to find soundscape changes. The physical qualities of sound can now identify the acoustic animal ecosystems as well. The detection of migrations, for example, can be found from this. The next step is for the acoustic indices to solve for the species that is at play for given sounds.

Recording animal vocals is useful with an ARU as they are not encroaching and are able to retain information on animal movement and habitat patterns. Localization within a community can gather data on the density of animals as well as their return rates. Localization specializes in tracking smaller, more elusive animals.

ARU's ability to detect vocalizations helps researchers to study the effects of vocal behavior on local ecosystems. Newer ARU's that can be attached to animals are able to decipher intentional noises from non intentional noises, allowing for less outlier data.
