= Maurice T. Dooling Jr. =

American judge (1889–1965)

Maurice Timothy Dooling Jr.
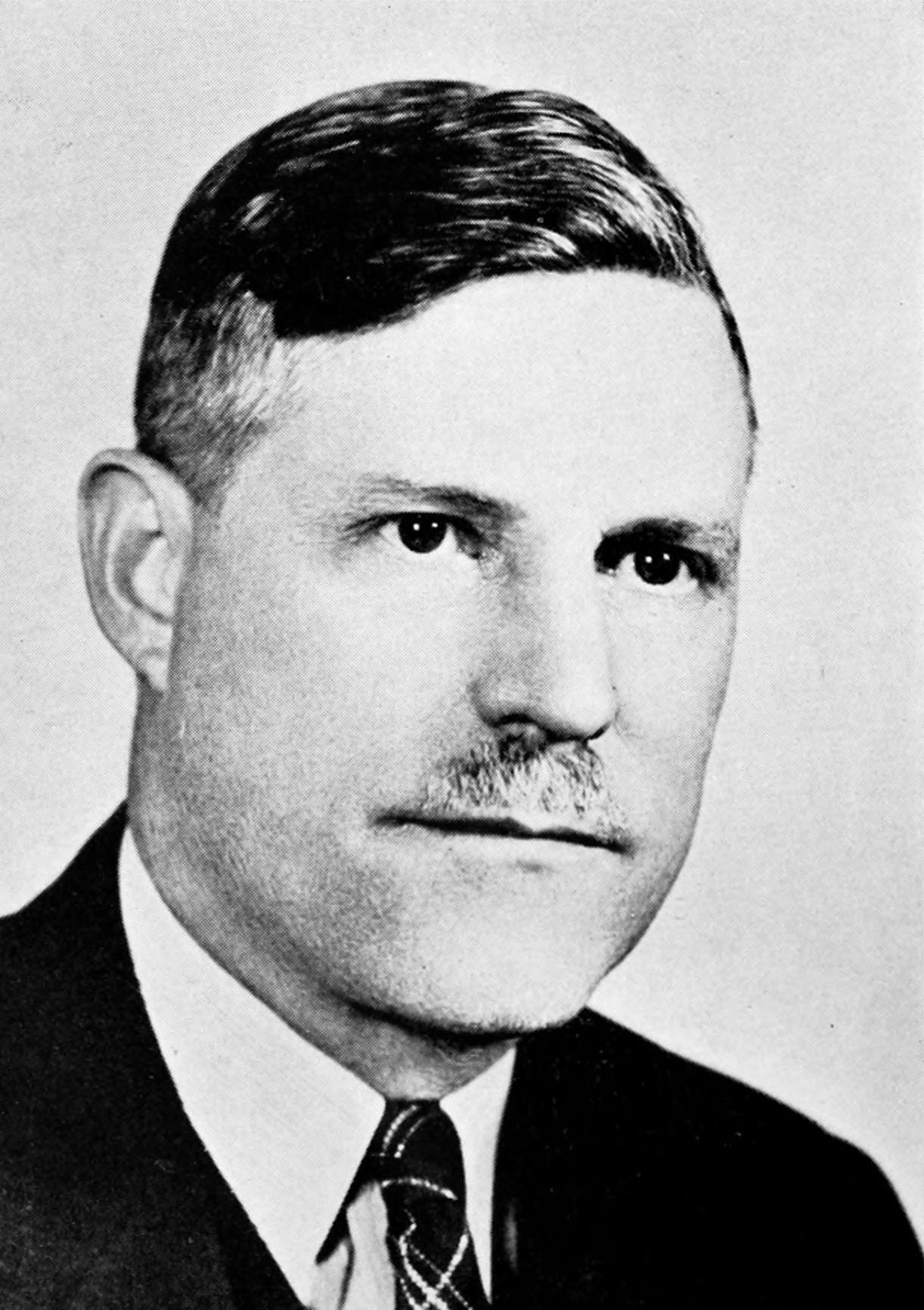
- Dooling c. 1940

Associate Justice of the California Supreme Court
- In office June 30, 1960 – June 30, 1962
- Appointed by: Governor Pat Brown
- Preceded by: Homer R. Spence
- Succeeded by: Mathew O. Tobriner

Associate Justice of the California Court of Appeal, First District
- In office 1945 – June 29, 1960
- Appointed by: Governor Earl Warren

Personal details
- Born: November 13, 1889 Hollister, California, US
- Died: October 18, 1965 (aged 75) San Francisco, California, US
- Spouse: Mary Margaret Devlin (m. 1916)
- Relatives: Maurice Timothy Dooling Sr. (father)
- Education: Stanford University (AB); Stanford Law School (LLB)

Maurice Timothy Dooling Jr. (November 13, 1889 – October 18, 1965) was an associate justice of the Supreme Court of California from June 30, 1960 to June 30, 1962.

== Early life and education ==
Dooling Jr. was born in Hollister, California, to Ida M. K. Wagner and the senior Maurice Timothy Dooling, an attorney who would later become a United States federal judge, appointed to the United States District Court for the Northern District of California by President Woodrow Wilson. Dooling Jr. graduated from San Benito County High School. He entered the University of Santa Clara at the age of 16, graduating in 1909 with a B.A. and named as both the class treasurer and poet. He received a second A.B. from Stanford University in 1911, and a LL.B. from the Stanford Law School in 1913, where he was one of the top students.

== Legal and judicial career ==
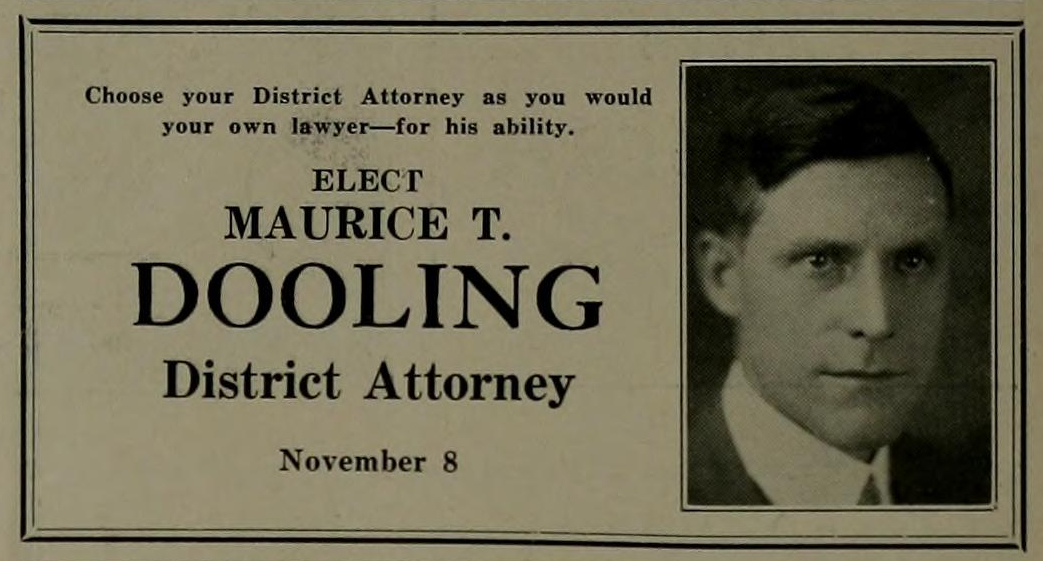
Dooling as a candidate for District Attorney of San Francisco in the San Francisco News Letter, October 22, 1927

The Stanford Dean recommended that San Francisco city attorney George Lull hire Dooling, who then worked at the city attorney's office into the 1920s. In 1921, he successfully represented the city before the Supreme Court of the United States in a case concerning the city's power to remove an unpermitted house built in the 1906 fire zone. After leaving the city attorney, he began a private practice.

In 1928, Governor C. C. Young appointed Dooling as a superior court judge of San Benito County, a position his father had held. In December 1937, he upheld a union's right to picket in front of a business. In June 1940, after the outbreak of World War II, Governor Culbert Olson appointed Dooling as San Benito county chairman of recruiting for the armed forces, should America join the conflict.

In 1945, Dooling was named an Associate Justice in the California Court of Appeal, First District, by Governor Earl Warren.

In June 1960, Governor Pat Brown appointed Dooling as Associate Justice to the California Supreme Court, to fill the vacancy from the resignation of Homer R. Spence. Among the notable cases Dooling voted on is the pair in 1961 arising out of the American Civil Liberties Union of Southern California lawsuits against the Boards of Education of both the cities of Los Angeles and San Diego. He joined the 4-3 majority opinion that held public school districts could not constitutionally require a loyalty oath, or "statement of information," from members of the public seeking to use a school building to hold meetings. In October 1961, the U.S. Supreme Court declined to review the decision. Dooling served on the court until June 30, 1962, when he resigned at 72 years of age.

After stepping down from the bench he continued to occasionally sit by designation on the Supreme Court. On October 18, 1965, he died in San Francisco.

== Personal life ==
In 1916, he married Mary Devlin, the daughter of a family friend, who was active in Democratic politics. They had two daughters: Mary M. ("Marjorie") Dooling and Alma Dooling.

== See also ==
- List of justices of the Supreme Court of California

Legal offices
Preceded by Homer R. Spence	Associate Justice of the California Supreme Court; 1960 – 1962	Succeeded by Mathew O. Tobriner
Preceded by	Associate Justice of the California Court of Appeal, First District; 1945 – 1960	Succeeded by
