= Sheila Tillerson Adams =

Pioneering African-American jurist (born 1957)

Sheila R. Tillerson Adams
- Born: December 16, 1957 (age 68); Washington, D.C.
- Education: Morgan State University; Howard University; Georgetown University Law Center
- Occupations: Jurist, Judge
- Spouse: Timothy J. Adams

Sheila R. Tillerson Adams (born December 16, 1957) is a retired American judge from Maryland. She was the first African-American woman to serve as deputy county attorney for Prince George's County, Maryland and the first to be named to the county's District Court.

== Biography ==
=== Early life and education ===
Sheila R. Tillerson was born in Washington, D.C., on December 16, 1957. She attended Menchville High School in Newport News, Virginia before heading to university in Baltimore, Maryland.

In 1979, Tillerson Adams graduated with a Bachelors of Science degree from Morgan State University in psychology. She then attended law school at Howard University, graduating with a J.D. in 1982. She was admitted to the Maryland Bar and Federal Bar in 1983. Tillerson Adams went on to receive a Master of Laws, concentrating in Taxation from Georgetown University Law Center in 1987.

=== Jurist ===
On June 19, 1988, Prince George's County Executive Parris Glendening appointed Judge Adams to a five-year term as deputy county attorney for Prince George's County. She became the first African-American in the county to hold this position.

In May 1992, Tillerson Adams was admitted to the Bar of the Supreme Court. In 1993, Governor William Donald Schaefer appointed her as the first African-American woman judge to sit on the Prince George's County District Court.

In 2010, she was appointed as Chief and Administrative Judge of the Circuit Court for Prince George's County and the Seventh Judicial Circuit of Maryland. As a judge in Prince George's County, she made community involvement a hallmark of her tenure, particularly with working with veterans and reoffenders. Tillerson Adams was vocal about the court's work in solving juvenile crime in the county, as concerns about youth violence were rising. She retired as a judge in 2023.

=== Personal life and legacy ===
She is married to Timothy J. Adams, mayor of Bowie, Maryland. In 2023, the City of Bowie honored Sheila Tillerson Adams with their 2023 Trailblazer award.
