= Charles Proctor Sifton =

American judge

Senior Judge of the United States District Court for the Eastern District of New York
- In office March 18, 2000 – November 9, 2009

Chief Judge of the United States District Court for the Eastern District of New York
- In office 1995–2000
- Preceded by: Thomas Collier Platt Jr.
- Succeeded by: Edward R. Korman

Judge of the United States District Court for the Eastern District of New York
- In office October 12, 1977 – March 18, 2000
- Appointed by: Jimmy Carter
- Preceded by: John Francis Dooling Jr.
- Succeeded by: Nicholas Garaufis

Personal details
- Born: Charles Proctor Sifton; March 18, 1935 New York City, New York
- Died: November 9, 2009 (aged 74) Brooklyn, New York
- Education: Harvard College (BA); Columbia Law School (LLB)

Charles Proctor Sifton (March 18, 1935 – November 9, 2009) was a United States district judge of the United States District Court for the Eastern District of New York from 1977 to 2009 and its Chief Judge from 1995 to 2000.

== Education and career ==
Born in New York City, New York, Sifton received a Bachelor of Arts degree from Harvard College in 1957 and a Bachelor of Laws from Columbia Law School in 1961. He was a Fulbright Scholar at the University of Göttingen in Göttingen, Germany from 1957 to 1958. Sifton worked as an attorney in private practice in New York City from 1961 to 1962 and as staff counsel to the United States Senate Committee on Foreign Relations from 1962 to 1964. He returned to private practice from 1964 to 1966, and again from 1969 to 1977. From 1966 to 1969, Sifton served as an Assistant United States Attorney for the Southern District of New York.

== Federal judicial service ==
On August 16, 1977, President Jimmy Carter nominated Sifton to a seat on the United States District Court for the Eastern District of New York that had been vacated by Judge John Francis Dooling Jr. Sifton was confirmed by the United States Senate on October 12, 1977 and received his commission the same day. He served as Chief Judge from 1995 to 2000, assuming senior status on March 18, 2000, and served in that status until his death from sarcoidosis on the morning of November 9, 2009.

== Notable cases ==
During his more than 30 years on the bench, he issued thousands of decisions in both civil and criminal cases. A few of his most publicized cases are listed below:

- In a 1982 opinion, Sifton held that the New York City firefighter eligibility test discriminated against female applicants. See Brenda Berkman, et al. v. The City of New York, CV-79-1813, 536 F. Supp. 177 (E.D.N.Y. 1982), aff’d Berkman v. City of New York, 705 F.2d 584 (2d Cir. 1983). The case resulted in the first female firefighters being permitted to join the NYFD.
- In a 1987 case, Judge Sifton found for the Lubavitch congregation in their suit against Barry Gourary, the grandson of the late Rebbe Joseph I. Schneersohn to recover a collection of books from the Rebbe's library. See Agudas Chasidei Chabad v. Gourary, CV-85-2909, 650 F. Supp. 1463 (E.D.N.Y. 1987), aff’d 833 F.2d 431 (2d Cir. 1987). The Lubavitch community continue to celebrate the favorable decision in an annual holiday named "Hey Teves", meaning the fifth day of the Hebrew month of Teves, the Hebrew date on which the opinion was issued (corresponding to Jan. 6, 1987).
- In another well known case, in 1992, Sifton found illegal the United States' seizure of RU-486 abortion pills that a pregnant woman had bought in France. The Supreme Court reversed his decision, but the publicity helped build support for the drug's U.S. approval in 2000. See Leona Benten v. David Kessler, Commissioner of the Food and Drug Administration, CV-92-3161, 799 F. Supp. 281 (E.D.N.Y. 1992), order stayed by USCA No. 92-6170., aff’d, 505 U.S. 1084, 112 S.Ct. 2929 (1992).
- In 2009, Sifton rejected an attempt to overturn the legislation that cleared the way for Mayor Michael R. Bloomberg and most other city elected officials to seek a third term.

== Personal ==
Sifton's first marriage was to Elisabeth Sifton, a prominent book editor and author who is the daughter of theologian Reinhold Niebuhr. He was survived by his wife, the artist Susan Rowland, children: Sam Sifton, the food editor of The New York Times and two other sons, Toby and John; and four grandchildren.

== Sources ==
- Sarcoidosis United

Legal offices
Preceded by John Francis Dooling Jr.	Judge of the United States District Court for the Eastern District of New York; 1977–2000	Succeeded by Nicholas Garaufis
Preceded by Thomas Collier Platt Jr.	Chief Judge of the United States District Court for the Eastern District of New York; 1995–2000	Succeeded by Edward R. Korman
