= Mass stranding =

Stranding of many marine animals on a beach

A mass stranding is the arrival on a beach of a number of similar creatures, often left clear of the water as the tide ebbs, frequently resulting in the deaths of most of them. It can be a specific form of fish kill and is one of the four types of strandings, with the other three being single strandings, mass mortalities and out of habitat situations.

== Species affected ==
Mass stranding events are known for many species, particularly cetaceans, but also including weedy seadragons, starfish, jellyfish, and various fish species including the Slender sunfish and Atlantic saury.

== Causes ==
Strandings can be due to either natural or anthropogenic causes. Natural causes can include one species herding another (e.g. mullet or menhaden) into shallows in a feeding frenzy. Reasons for the latter can include, for cetaceans, chemical pollution toxin, plastics ingestion, fisheries, vessel collision, sonar activities, and anthropogenic noise, in addition to mortalities through strandings resulting from dolphin drive hunting.

== Sources ==
- Moore, Kathleen M.; Simeone, Claire A.; Brownell, Robert L. (2018). "Strandings". Encyclopedia of Marine Mammals. Elsevier. doi:10.1016/b978-0-12-804327-1.00249-1. ISBN 978-0-12-804327-1.
- Perrin, William F.; Geraci, Joseph R. (2009). "Stranding". Encyclopedia of Marine Mammals. Elsevier. doi:10.1016/b978-0-12-373553-9.00256-x. ISBN 978-0-12-373553-9.
- Sheehan, Emma V.; Cousens, Sophie L. (2017). ""Starballing": a potential explanation for mass stranding". Marine Biodiversity. 47 (2): 617–618. Bibcode:2017MarBd..47..617S. doi:10.1007/s12526-016-0504-3. ISSN 1867-1616.
