= Nicholas Garaufis =

American judge (born 1948)

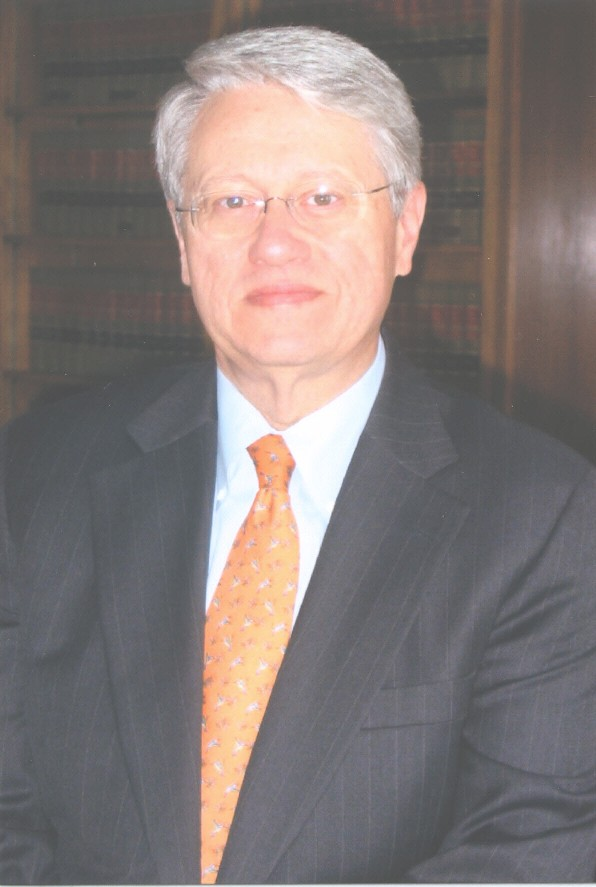

Senior Judge of the United States District Court for the Eastern District of New York
- Incumbent
- Assumed office October 1, 2014

Judge of the United States District Court for the Eastern District of New York
- In office May 25, 2000 – October 1, 2014
- Appointed by: Bill Clinton
- Preceded by: Charles P. Sifton
- Succeeded by: LaShann DeArcy Hall

Personal details
- Born: Nicholas George Garaufis; September 28, 1948 (age 78) Paterson, New Jersey, U.S.
- Spouse: Elizabeth Seidman
- Education: Columbia University (BA, JD)

Nicholas George Garaufis (born September 28, 1948) is a senior United States district judge of the United States District Court for the Eastern District of New York.

== Early life and education ==
Garaufis was born in Paterson, New Jersey, to Demetria (1924–2011) and George Garaufis (1919–2007). His father was a civil engineer and his mother was the district office manager for Republican Congressman Seymour Halpern. His grandparents were Greek immigrants.

Garaufis graduated from Columbia College of Columbia University in 1969 with a Bachelor of Arts degree and received his Juris Doctor from Columbia Law School in 1974. He taught in the New York City public schools prior to receiving his Juris Doctor.

== Career ==
Garaufis began his legal career in 1974 as an associate of Chadbourne & Parke. He also served as an Assistant Attorney General in the Litigation Bureau of the New York State Attorney General's office under Attorney General Louis J. Lefkowitz and has practiced law privately in Queens County, New York. Garaufis served for more than five years as the Chief Counsel of the Federal Aviation Administration in Washington, D.C., overseeing a staff of 200 attorneys. Prior to his appointment to the Clinton Administration in June 1995, Garaufis served for nine years as counsel to Queens Borough President Claire Shulman in New York City.

== Federal judicial service ==
Upon the recommendation of United States Senator Daniel Patrick Moynihan, Garaufis was nominated by President Clinton on February 28, 2000, to a seat on the United States District Court for the Eastern District of New York vacated by Charles P. Sifton and confirmed by unanimous consent by the United States Senate on May 24, 2000. Garaufis received his commission on May 25, 2000, and entered service on August 28, 2000. Garaufis took senior status on October 1, 2014.

=== New York Fire Department hiring case ===
In 2007, the United States Department of Justice, joined by the Vulcan Society, an organization of black firefighters, and three individual applicants, filed a lawsuit against New York City alleging that the city's written firefighter entrance exam excluded a disproportionate number of black and Hispanic applicants. At that time, just three percent of the department's 11,000 firefighters were black and 4.5 percent were Hispanic despite the fact that over half the population of New York City was black or Hispanic. On October 5, 2011, Garaufis ruled that a court-appointed monitor would be installed to oversee the New York City Fire Department's efforts to hire and retain more minorities. While the ruling did not impose racial quotas, it explained that a systemic effort by the Fire Department was required. On September 28, 2012, Garaufis approved a new entrance exam for firefighters after the city submitted data showing that the test produced results more representative of the city's racial and ethnic makeup. The first class of recruits after the ruling included some recruits that were older than had been typical of previous classes. Injuries in that class were higher and the dropout rate, usually 10 percent, was 24 percent for that class.

On May 14, 2013, an appeals court disagreed with Garaufis's finding that the discrimination was intentional. The appeals court determined that the question of intentionality, which was relevant to the amount of damages the city might have to pay, should go to trial under a different judge. After the appeals court's ruling, the parties settled the remaining claims in the case, and the entire case was referred to Garaufis for oversight of the settlement.

The number of minority firefighters in the department doubled to 1,230 between 2002 and 2013. On June 28, 2018, the Fire Department reported that forty-three percent of the nearly 2,300 top scorers on its most recent entrance exam were black or Hispanic. In October 2018, people of color comprised more than 40 percent of the class graduating from the training academy.

=== Bryant Neal Vinas terrorism case ===
On May 11, 2017, Garaufis sentenced Bryant Neal Vinas to time served for providing material support for terrorism, giving the highly cooperative informant three months more in prison before beginning a life on probation.

=== Deferred Action for Childhood Arrivals ===
In 2016, Martín Batalla Vidal, a recipient of Deferred Action for Childhood Arrivals (DACA), filed a federal lawsuit in the Eastern District of New York challenging the Department of Homeland Security (DHS)’s decision to revoke his work permit in connection with the nationwide injunction issued by the Southern District of Texas. The Texas case sought to block the implementation of the Deferred Action for Parents of Americans Lawful Permanent Residents (DAPA) and an expansion of DACA. On September 29, 2016, the advocacy organization Make the Road New York (MRNY) joined Batalla Vidal's lawsuit.

On February 13, 2018, Garaufis issued a nationwide preliminary injunction enjoining rescission of the DACA program. Garaufis found that Plaintiffs were entitled to a preliminary injunction. The government appealed Garaufis's decision to the Second Circuit, which heard oral argument on January 25, 2019.

On July 28, 2020, Chad Wolf, who served as Acting Secretary of the Department of Homeland Security, issued a memorandum stating new DACA applicants would not be accepted, and renewals would be limited to one year instead of two. Garaufis ruled on November 14 that Wolf was not lawfully appointed as the Acting Secretary, and that the memorandum was invalid as a result of that.

== Personal life ==
Following the death of his first wife, writer and television producer Eleanor Prescott, Garaufis married New York-based nonprofit executive and board director Elizabeth Seidman in 2002 in Queens, New York. Judge Robert A. Katzmann officiated the ceremony.

Legal offices
Preceded by Charles P. Sifton	Judge of the United States District Court for the Eastern District of New York; 2000–2014	Succeeded by LaShann DeArcy Hall
