= Marine mammal observer =

Environmental consulting

A marine mammal observer (MMO) is a professional in environmental consulting who specializes in whales and dolphins.

In recent years there has been increased concern for the effect of man-made noise pollution in the ocean, particularly upon cetaceans - which are known to be sensitive to sound. As a result, environmental regulations have been introduced in an attempt to minimise negative impacts on marine wildlife. These guidelines have focused on the oil industry's seismic exploration for offshore oil. They center on the practice of delaying or shutting down the use of air-guns if a whale or dolphin is sighted nearby. As a result, the International Association of Oil & Gas Producers released a report in 2017 describing recommended monitoring and mitigation measures for cetaceans during marine seismic survey geophysical operations. An MMO will implement these regulations in the field.

When on board the seismic vessel, the MMO's job is two-fold:

1. To spot sensitive wildlife species
2. To monitor adherence to the guidelines.

Spotting, and identifying, animals involves long hours of visual surveys. Detecting cetaceans with hydrophones is known as Passive Acoustic Monitoring (PAM), and this is an increasingly common technique used in addition to visual surveys. Ensuring adherence to guidelines requires a thorough knowledge of the regulations, understanding of the operations and the ability to communicate effectively with the crew. MMOs usually have a strong background in marine biology and conservation. Increasingly, the oil industry is employing a 'best practice' attitude to environmental commitment and voluntarily taking on MMOs as independent observers in areas where no government regulations exist. In some circumstances guidelines may be open to interpretation or the environmental conditions unique and the MMO will be called upon to advise on a sensible mitigation protocol.

As well as the seismic exploration industry, MMOs may also be required during; oil rig decommissioning, where disused oil platforms on the seabed are removed by large amounts of explosives, marine construction projects and; military trials of powerful new active sonar systems. Typically MMO duties are funded by the surveying company.

Noise from human activity in the ocean environment is likely to increase - and become a bigger environmental issue. Discussion of how to minimize the negative effects of noise upon whales, dolphins and other marine-life will no doubt continue between industry, government agencies, military, environmental organizations and academics. It will be the MMO who puts this into practice in the field.
