= John Thomas Dooling =

American lawyer

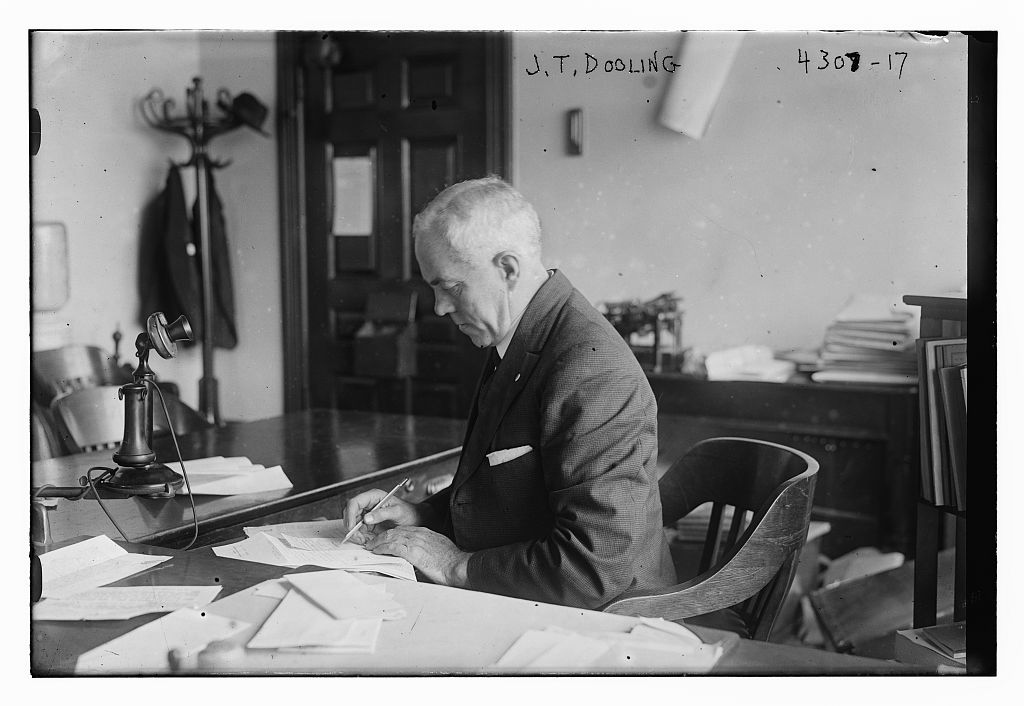
Dooling at his desk in 1917

John Thomas Dooling (February 22, 1871 – November 15, 1949) was the assistant district attorney for New York City and an adviser to Tammany Hall for 40 years.

== Biography ==
Dooling was born on February 22, 1871, in Brooklyn, New York City. He died on November 15, 1949, in White Plains, New York.
