= The Effects of Noise on Aquatic Life =

The Effects of Noise on Aquatic Life is a conference that takes place once every three years. It was held for the first time in Nyborg, Denmark in 2007. The second and third meetings were in Cork, Ireland (2010) and Budapest, Hungary (2013). The fourth meeting took place in Dublin, Ireland, in July 2016. The 2007 meeting in Nyborg was the first scientific conference to include in its scope the effects of noise on both fish and marine mammals. The third and fourth conferences were each followed by a one-day workshop, respectively the Workshop on International Harmonisation of Approaches to Define Underwater Noise Exposure Criteria and the International Airgun Modelling Workshop: Validation of Source Signature and Sound Propagation Models. A fifth conference was held in 2019, in The Hague, Netherlands.
