= Maurice Timothy Dooling =

American judge (1860-1924)

Maurice Timothy Dooling Sr.
- Dooling c. 1905

Judge of the United States District Court for the Northern District of California
- In office July 28, 1913 – November 4, 1924
- Appointed by: Woodrow Wilson
- Preceded by: John J. De Haven
- Succeeded by: Adolphus Frederic St. Sure

Member of the California State Assembly from the 68th district
- In office January 5, 1885 - January 3, 1887
- Preceded by: district created
- Succeeded by: John H. Matthews

Personal details
- Born: Maurice Timothy Dooling; October 12, 1860 Moores Flat, California
- Died: November 4, 1924 (aged 64) San Francisco, California
- Party: Democratic
- Spouse: Ida M. K. Wagner
- Children: Maurice T. Dooling Jr.
- Education: Saint Mary's College of California (A.B., A.M.); Santa Clara College (Ph.D.) read law

Maurice Timothy Dooling Sr. (October 12, 1860 – November 4, 1924) was a United States district judge of the United States District Court for the Northern District of California.

== Education and career ==
Dooling was born in a mining camp near Moores Flat, California, to Elizabeth Mary and Timothy Dooling, Irish immigrants who were pioneers in the territory. Maurice received an Artium Baccalaureus degree in 1880 and an Artium Magister degree in 1881 from Saint Mary's College of California (in San Francisco at that time). He was a teacher at St. Mary's College from 1881 to 1883, and read law to enter the bar in 1885. He then served as a Democratic Party member of the California State Assembly from the San Benito County district from 1885 to 1887, and as a Judge of the Superior Court of San Benito County from 1897 to 1913. He received a Doctor of Philosophy from Santa Clara College (now Santa Clara University) in 1903.

== Unsuccessful judicial race ==
In 1906, Dooling ran for election to the position of Associate Justice of the California Court of Appeal for the First District on the Democratic ticket but lost by a slim margin to Republicans Frank H. Kerrigan and S. P. Hall.

== Federal judicial service ==
On July 18, 1913, Dooling was nominated by President Woodrow Wilson to a seat on the United States District Court for the Northern District of California vacated by Judge John J. De Haven. Dooling was confirmed by the United States Senate on July 28, 1913, and received his commission the same day. Dooling served in that capacity until his death in San Francisco on November 4, 1924, from a relapse caused by overexertion, after suffering influenza the previous January.

== Family ==
Dooling's son, Maurice T. Dooling Jr., was appointed to the Supreme Court of California in 1960.

== Sources ==
- Fritz, Christian G.; Griffith, Michael; Hunter, Janet (1985). A Judicial Odyssey: Federal Court in Santa Clara, San Benito, Santa Cruz and Monterey Counties. San Jose, CA: Advisory Committee, San Jose Federal Court. pp. 63–70. ISBN 0961369000. Article by Dettweiler, Alma Dooling. "Maurice T. Dooling, 1860-1924".

Legal offices
Preceded by John J. De Haven	Judge of the United States District Court for the Northern District of California; 1913–1924	Succeeded by Adolphus Frederic St. Sure
