= Robert Dooling =

American psychologist

Robert J. Dooling
- Occupations: Psychologist and academic

Academic background
- Education: B.S., Biology and Chemistry; M.S., Biology and Psychology; Ph.D., Physiological Psychology
- Alma mater: Creighton University; St. Louis University

Academic work
- Institutions: University of Maryland

Robert J. Dooling is an American psychologist and an academic. He is an emeritus as well as a research professor at the University of Maryland.

Dooling has conducted research on hearing and neuroethology, with a focus on understanding how birds and other animals communicate with one another acoustically and drawing parallels between human and animal hearing and communication. He has authored and edited books including Comparative Hearing: Birds and Reptiles and The Comparative Psychology of Audition: Perceiving Complex Sound.

As of June 2025, Dooling's research has been cited 5300 times according to Scopus.

== Education ==
Dooling received his B.S. in Biology and Chemistry in 1967 from Creighton University. He completed his M.S. in Biology and Psychology in 1969 and later, his Ph.D. in Physiological Psychology in 1975 from St. Louis University.

== Career ==
Dooling began his academic career as a research assistant for the Central Institute for the Deaf, working there from 1967 to 1969 and 1971 to 1975. He was the postdoctoral fellow at Rockefeller University from 1975 and 1977 and was appointed as an assistant professor at Rockefeller University between 1977 and 1981. He was appointed as an assistant professor at Department of Psychology at University of Maryland in 1981. He became associate professor in 1984, full professor in 1988 and emeritus professor in 2019.

Dooling was director of Neuroscience and Cognitive Science Program from 2007 to 2013 and was co-director for the Neuroscience Major at the University of Maryland between 2019 and 2020.

== Research ==
Dooling's research focused on the behavioral investigations of hearing in small birds. He showed that adult budgerigars develop convergent contact calls through mutual vocal imitations of social companions. He showed that budgerigars, like humans, could adjust the intensity of their vocalizations voluntarily and in response to hearing loss or noise in their environment. His findings established that the birds monitored their vocal output through external auditory feedback and, like humans, also demonstrated the Lombard effect. He also recorded the auditory brainstem response (ABR) in young and adult birds and tracked the progress of hearing loss and hearing recovery from loud noise exposure using the ABR waves.

In later research, Dooling demonstrated that zebra finches are sensitive to the fine acoustic details of individual syllables in their song, well beyond the capabilities of other birds or humans, suggesting zebra finches live in an auditory world to which humans are not privy. Further studies showed that zebra finches can discriminate between the renditions of different voices, even at the level of single song syllables; confirming that fine acoustic details in song syllables are the primary channel of vocal communication in this species.

As of June 2025, Dooling's research has been cited 5300 times according to Scopus.

== Awards and honors ==
- 1983 – Behavioral Science Research Award, Washington Academy of Sciences
- 2002 – Distinguished Scholar-Teacher Award, University of Maryland

== Bibliography ==
=== Books ===
- Dooling, Robert J.; Hulse, Stewart H. (1989). The Comparative Psychology of Audition: Perceiving Complex Sounds. L. Erlbaum Associates. ISBN 9780805800203.
- Klump, G. M.; Dooling, R. J.; Fay, Richard R.; Stebbins, William (1995). Methods in Comparative Psychoacoustics. Birkhäuser Basel. ISBN 9783034874656.
- Comparative Hearing: Birds and Reptiles. 2000. ISBN 9780387946849.
- Slabbekoorn, Hans; Dooling, Robert J.; Popper, Arthur N.; Fay, Richard R. (2018). Effects of Anthropogenic Noise on Animals. Springer. ISBN 9781493993307.

=== Selected articles ===
- Okanoya, K.; Dooling, R. J. (1987). "Hearing in passerine and psittacine birds: A comparative study of absolute and masked auditory thresholds". Journal of Comparative Psychology. 101 (1): 7–15. doi:10.1037/0735-7036.101.1.7. PMID 3568610.
- Farabaugh, S. M.; Linzenbold, A.; Dooling, R. J. (1994). "Vocal plasticity in budgerigars (Melopsittacus undulatus): evidence for social factors in the learning of contact calls". Journal of Comparative Psychology. 108 (1): 81–92. doi:10.1037/0735-7036.108.1.81. PMID 8174348.
- Lohr, B.; Wright, T. F.; Dooling, R. J. (2003). "Detection and discrimination of natural calls in masking noise by birds: estimating the active space of a signal". Animal Behaviour. 65 (4): 763–777. doi:10.1006/anbe.2003.2093.
- Dooling, R. J.; Popper, A. N. (2016). "Some lessons from the effects of highway noise on birds". Proceedings of Meetings on Acoustics. 27 (1). AIP Publishing: 010004. doi:10.1121/2.0000244.
- Dooling, R. J.; Blumenrath, S. H. (2016). "Masking Experiments in Humans and Birds Using Anthropogenic Noises". The Effects of Noise on Aquatic Life II. Advances in Experimental Medicine and Biology. Vol. 875. Springer New York. pp. 239–243. doi:10.1007/978-1-4939-2981-8_28. ISBN 978-1-4939-2980-1. PMID 26610965.
