= John Francis Dooling Jr. =

American judge

Senior Judge of the United States District Court for the Eastern District of New York
- In office November 30, 1976 – January 12, 1981

Judge of the United States District Court for the Eastern District of New York
- In office September 22, 1961 – November 30, 1976
- Appointed by: John F. Kennedy
- Preceded by: Seat established by 75 Stat. 80
- Succeeded by: Charles Proctor Sifton

Personal details
- Born: John Francis Dooling Jr. June 13, 1908 Brooklyn, New York
- Died: January 12, 1981 (aged 72)
- Education: St. Francis College (A.B.); St. John's University School of Law (LL.B.); Harvard Law School (LL.B.)

John Francis Dooling Jr. (June 13, 1908 – January 12, 1981) was a United States district judge of the United States District Court for the Eastern District of New York.

== Education and career ==
Born in Brooklyn, New York, Dooling received an Artium Baccalaureus degree from St. Francis College in 1929. He received a Bachelor of Laws from St. John's University School of Law in 1932. He received a Bachelor of Laws from Harvard Law School in 1934. He was in private practice of law in New York City from 1934 to 1961.

== Federal judicial service ==
Dooling was nominated by President John F. Kennedy on September 14, 1961, to the United States District Court for the Eastern District of New York, to a new seat created by 75 Stat. 80. He was confirmed by the United States Senate on September 21, 1961, and received his commission on September 22, 1961. He assumed senior status on November 30, 1976. His service was terminated on January 12, 1981, due to his death.

Legal offices
| Preceded by Seat established by 75 Stat. 80 | Judge of the United States District Court for the Southern District of New York; 1961–1976 | Succeeded by Charles Proctor Sifton |
