= List of California gubernatorial elections =

Elections are held in the U.S. state of California to select the state's governor for the ensuing four years beginning at noon on the Monday after January 1 following the election. Since the passage of Proposition 140 on November 6, 1990, the constitution rules that each governor should not serve more than two terms.

== List of elections ==
Parties

Independent Democratic Independent Democrat Whig Know Nothing/American Republican Prohibition Lecompton Democrat Anti-Lecompton Democrat Chivalry Democratic National Union Progressive

Election	Incumbent governor	Elected governor	Votes		Runner(s)-up	Votes		Margin		Notes
Election	Incumbent governor	Elected governor	#	%	Runner(s)-up	#	%	#	%	Notes
1849 (Note: McDougal resigned from office on January 9, 1851, after his first annual address was criticized by the legislature.)	Office established	Peter Hardeman Burnett	6,783	47.72%	Arthur St. Clair	2,864	9.29%	3,563	25.07%	
1851	John McDougal	John Bigler	23,175	50.48%	Pierson B. Reading	22,735	49.52%	440	0.96%	
1853	John Bigler	John Bigler	38,940	50.97%	William Waldo	37,454	49.03%	1,486	1.95%	
1855	John Bigler	J. Neely Johnson	51,157	52.52%	John Bigler	46,220	47.45%	4,937	5.07%	
1857	J. Neely Johnson	John B. Weller	53,122	56.71%	Edward Stanly	21,040	22.46%	32,082	34.25%	
1859 (Note: Latham resigned from office on January 14, 1860, after being elected by the state legislature to a seat in the U.S. Senate.)	John B. Weller	Milton Latham	61,352	59.13%	John Currey	31,298	31.13%	29,054	28.00%	
1861	John G. Downey	Leland Stanford	56,036	46.41%	John McConnell	32,751	27.35%	23,285	19.45%	
1863 (Note: California made its first gubernatorial election in a four-year term in 1863 after previous governors had only served two-year terms.)	Leland Stanford	Frederick Low	64,283	59.03%	John G. Downey	44,622	40.97%	19,661	18.05%	
1867	Frederick Low	Henry Huntly Haight	49,905	54.04%	George Congdon Gorham	40,359	43.70%	9,546	10.34%	
1871 (Note: Booth resigned on February 27, 1875 after having been elected to the United States Senate.)	Henry Huntly Haight	Newton Booth	61,819	52.12%	Henry Huntly Haight	56,800	47.88%	5,019	4.23%	
1875	Romualdo Pacheco	William Irwin	61,509	50.03%	Timothy Guy Phelps	31,322	25.48%	30,187	24.55%	
1879	William Irwin	George Clement Perkins	67,965	42.42%	Hugh J. Glenn	47,647	29.75%	20,318	12.68%	
1882 (Note: California made its first gubernatorial election after a constitution change in 1879, which moved the election date for state officers to coincide with federal elections in non-presidential even-numbered years.)	George Clement Perkins	George Stoneman	90,694	55.07%	Morris M. Estee	67,175	40.79%	25,319	14.28%	
1886	Washington Bartlett	Washington Bartlett	84,970	43.43%	John Franklin Swift	84,316	43.10%	654	0.33%	
1890	Washington Bartlett	Henry Markham	125,129	49.56%	Edward B. Pond	117,184	46.42%	7,945	3.15%	
1894	Henry Markham	James Budd	111,944	39.34%	Morris M. Estee	110,738	38.92%	1,206	0.42%	
1898	James Budd	Henry T. Gage	148,354	51.68%	James G. Maguire	129,261	45.03%	19,093	6.65%	
1902	Henry T. Gage	George Pardee	146,332	48.06%	Franklin Knight Lane	143,783	47.22%	2,549	0.84%	
1906	George Pardee	James Gillett	125,887	40.35%	Theodore Arlington Bell	117,645	37.71%	8,242	2.64%	
1910 (Note: Hiram Johnson moved to his own political party, Progressive Party, in 1912 to support former President Theodore Roosevelt's nomination during the 1912 Republican National Convention.)	James Gillett	Hiram Johnson	177,191	45.94%	Theodore Arlington Bell	154,835	40.14%	22,356	5.80%	
1914 (Note: Johnson resigned on March 15, 1917, after having been elected to the United States Senate, and he moved back to the Republican Party in 1916.)	Hiram Johnson	Hiram Johnson	460,495	49.69%	John D. Fredericks	271,990	29.35%	188,505	20.34%	
1918	William Stephens	William Stephens	387,547	56.27%	Theodore Arlington Bell	251,189	36.47%	136,358	19.80%	
1922	William Stephens	Friend William Richardson	576,445	59.69%	Thomas Lee Woolwine	347,530	35.98%	228,915	23.70%	
1926	Friend William Richardson	C. C. Young	814,815	71.22%	Justus S. Wardell	282,451	24.69%	532,364	46.53%	
1930 (Note: Rolph died in office on June 2, 1934.)	C. C. Young	James Rolph	999,393	72.15%	Milton K. Young	333,973	24.11%	665,420	48.04%	
1934	Frank Merriam	Frank Merriam	1,138,620	48.87%	Upton Sinclair	879,537	37.75%	259,083	11.12%	
1938	Frank Merriam	Culbert Olson	1,391,734	52.49%	Frank Merriam	1,171,019	44.17%	220,715	8.32%	
1942	Culbert Olson	Earl Warren	1,275,287	57.07%	Culbert Olson	932,995	41.75%	342,292	15.32%	
1946	Earl Warren	Earl Warren	2,344,542	91.64%	Henry R. Schmidt	180,579	7.06%	2,163,963	84.58%	
1950 (Note: Warren resigned on October 4, 1953, having been appointed Chief Justice of the United States. His resignation letter specified he would leave office at "12 o'clock midnight, Sunday, Oct 4, 1953".)	Earl Warren	Earl Warren	2,461,754	64.85%	James Roosevelt	1,333,856	35.14%	1,127,898	29.71%	
1954	Goodwin Knight	Goodwin Knight	2,290,519	56.83%	Richard P. Graves	1,739,368	43.16%	551,151	13.67%	
1958	Goodwin Knight	Pat Brown	3,140,076	59.75%	William F. Knowland	2,110,911	40.16%	1,029,165	19.58%	
1962	Pat Brown	Pat Brown	3,037,109	51.89%	Richard Nixon	2,740,351	46.82%	296,758	5.07%	
1966	Pat Brown	Ronald Reagan	3,742,913	57.55%	Pat Brown	2,749,174	42.27%	993,739	15.28%	
1970	Ronald Reagan	Ronald Reagan	3,439,664	52.84%	Jesse M. Unruh	2,938,607	45.14%	501,057	7.70%	
1974	Ronald Reagan	Jerry Brown	3,131,648	50.12%	Houston I. Flournoy	2,952,954	47.26%	178,694	2.86%	
1978	Jerry Brown	Jerry Brown	3,878,812	56.03%	Evelle J. Younger	2,526,534	36.50%	1,352,278	19.53%	
1982	Jerry Brown	George Deukmejian	3,881,014	49.27%	Tom Bradley	3,787,669	48.09%	93,345	1.19%	
1986	George Deukmejian	George Deukmejian	4,506,601	60.54%	Tom Bradley	2,781,714	37.37%	1,724,887	23.17%	
1990 (Note: Under a 1990 amendment to the constitution, California made its first gubernatorial election for governors who should not serve more than two terms.)	George Deukmejian	Pete Wilson	3,791,904	49.25%	Dianne Feinstein	3,525,197	45.78%	266,707	3.46%	
1994	Pete Wilson	Pete Wilson	4,781,766	55.18%	Kathleen Brown	3,519,799	40.62%	1,261,967	14.56%	
1998	Pete Wilson	Gray Davis	4,860,702	57.97%	Dan Lungren	3,218,030	38.38%	1,642,672	19.59%	
2002	Gray Davis	Gray Davis	3,533,490	47.26%	Bill Simon	3,169,801	42.40%	363,689	4.86%	
2003 (recall) (Note: Davis was recalled by 55.39% of voters on October 7, 2003, and Arnold Schwarzenegger was elected to replace him in a special election on November 17, 2003.)	Gray Davis	Arnold Schwarzenegger	4,206,284	48.58%	Cruz Bustamante	2,724,874	31.47%	1,481,410	17.11%	
2006	Arnold Schwarzenegger	Arnold Schwarzenegger	4,850,157	55.88%	Phil Angelides	3,376,732	38.91%	1,473,425	16.98%	
2010 (Note: After serving as governor from 1975 to 1983, Brown's term limits did not apply due to a grandfather clause, and the law only affects terms served after November 6, 1990.)	Arnold Schwarzenegger	Jerry Brown	5,428,149	53.77%	Meg Whitman	4,127,391	40.88%	1,300,758	12.88%	
2014	Jerry Brown	Jerry Brown	4,388,368	59.97%	Neel Kashkari	2,929,213	40.03%	1,459,155	19.94%	
2018 (Note: Newsom survived the recall election on September 14, 2021, by nearly 62% of voters.)	Jerry Brown	Gavin Newsom	7,721,410	61.95%	John H. Cox	4,742,825	38.05%	2,978,585	23.90%	
2022	Gavin Newsom	Gavin Newsom	6,470,104	59.18%	Brian Dahle	4,462,914	40.82%	2,007,190	18.36%	
2026 (results TBA)	Gavin Newsom	TBA								
