= List of governors of California =

Governor of California
- Seal of the governor of California

- Flag of the governor of California

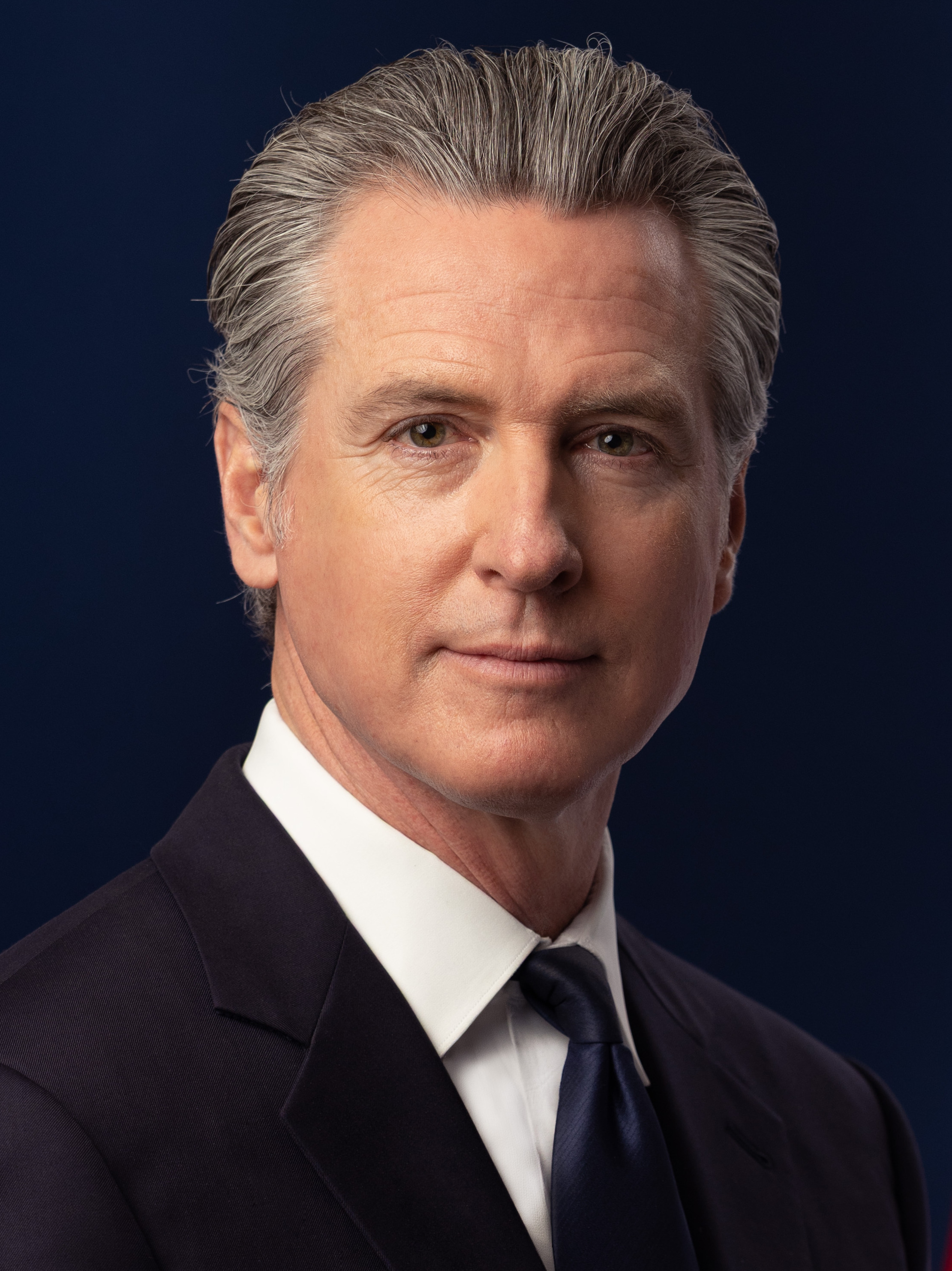
- Incumbent; Gavin Newsom since January 7, 2019
- Style: The Honorable
- Residence: Private home in the Fair Oaks suburb, near Sacramento, CA
- Term length: Four years, renewable once consecutively or not
- Inaugural holder: Peter Hardeman Burnett
- Formation: Ceded to the United States after the Mexican-American war, officially entered into the United States with a constitution on September 9, 1850
- Succession: Line of succession
- Deputy: Lieutenant Governor of California
- Salary: $245,929 (2026)
- Website: www.gov.ca.gov

The governor of California is the head of government of California, whose responsibilities include making annual State of the State addresses to the California State Legislature, submitting the budget, and ensuring that state laws are enforced. The governor is also the commander-in-chief of the state's military forces. The current governor is Gavin Newsom, who has been in office since 2019. Newson will be succeeded by Xavier Becerra in January 2027. 39 people have served as governor, over 40 distinct terms. Many have been influential nationwide in areas far-flung from state politics. Leland Stanford founded Stanford University in 1891. Earl Warren, later chief justice of the United States, won an election with the nominations of the three major parties – the only person to run essentially unopposed for governor of California. Ronald Reagan, who was president of the Screen Actors Guild and later president of the United States, and Arnold Schwarzenegger both came to prominence through acting. Gray Davis, the 37th governor of California, was the second governor in American history to be recalled by voters. The shortest tenure was that of Milton Latham, who served only five days before being elected to fill a vacant United States Senate seat. The longest tenure is that of Jerry Brown, who served as governor from 1975 to 1983 and again from 2011 to 2019, the only governor to serve non-consecutive terms. He is the son of former governor Pat Brown who served from 1959 to 1967.

== List of governors ==
California was obtained by the United States in the Mexican Cession following the Mexican–American War. Unlike most other states, it was never organized as a territory and was admitted as the 31st state on September 9, 1850. The 1849 constitution of California called for elections every two years, with no set start date for the term. An amendment ratified in 1862 increased the term to four years. The 1879 constitution set the term to begin on the first Monday after January 1, following an election. In 1990, Proposition 140 led to a constitutional amendment implementing a term limit of two terms.

Prior to this limit, only one governor, Earl Warren, served more than two terms. Jerry Brown was elected to a third term in 2010, and then to a fourth and final term in 2014, because his previous terms were before the term limit was enacted. The 1849 constitution created the office of lieutenant governor, who, in cases of vacancy in the office of governor, becomes governor. The governor and the lieutenant governor are not formally elected on the same ticket.

Governors of the State of California
No.	Governor	Term in office	Party	Election	Lt. Governor (Note: Lieutenant governors represented the same party as their governor unless noted.)
1	Peter Hardeman Burnett (1807–1895)	December 20, 1849 (Note: A civilian government was formed in late 1849 prior to official statehood, and operated as the state government for ten months before official statehood was granted.) – January 9, 1851 (386 days; resigned) (Note: Burnett abruptly resigned after his first annual address was criticized by the legislature.)	Non-partisan (Note: The 1849 election was non-partisan; sources say Burnett was an Independent Democrat.)	1849	John McDougal
2	John McDougal (1818–1866)	January 9, 1851 – January 8, 1852 (365 days; retired) (Note: Some sources say McDougal later served in the California State Senate; however, they are mixing him up with James A. McDougall.)	Non-partisan (Note: The 1849 election was non-partisan; sources say McDougal was an Independent Democrat.)	Succeeded from lieutenant governor	David C. Broderick (Note: Represented the Democratic Party) (acting)
3	John Bigler (1805–1871)	January 8, 1852 – January 9, 1856 (1463 days; lost election)	Democratic	1851	Samuel Purdy
3	John Bigler (1805–1871)	January 8, 1852 – January 9, 1856 (1463 days; lost election)	Democratic	1853	Samuel Purdy
4	J. Neely Johnson (1825–1872)	January 9, 1856 – January 8, 1858 (731 days; lost nomination)	American	1855	Robert M. Anderson
5	John B. Weller (1812–1875)	January 8, 1858 – January 9, 1860 (732 days; retired)	Democratic	1857	Joseph Walkup
6	Milton S. Latham (1827–1882)	January 9, 1860 – January 14, 1860 (6 days; resigned) (Note: Latham resigned, having been elected to the United States Senate.)	Lecompton; Democratic	1859	John G. Downey
7	John G. Downey (1827–1894)	January 14, 1860 – January 10, 1862 (728 days; retired)	Lecompton; Democratic	Succeeded from lieutenant governor	Isaac N. Quinn (acting) (term ended January 7, 1861)
7	John G. Downey (1827–1894)	January 14, 1860 – January 10, 1862 (728 days; retired)	Lecompton; Democratic	Succeeded from lieutenant governor	Pablo de la Guerra (acting)
8	Leland Stanford (1824–1893)	January 10, 1862 – December 10, 1863 (700 days; retired) (Note: Stanford withdrew after losing the early primaries of the Union/Republican nomination.)	Republican	1861	John F. Chellis
9	Frederick Low (1828–1894)	December 10, 1863 – December 5, 1867 (1457 days; retired)	Union	1863 (Note: First term under an 1862 constitutional amendment, which lengthened terms to four years.)	Tim N. Machin
10	Henry Huntly Haight (1825–1878)	December 5, 1867 – December 8, 1871 (1465 days; lost election)	Democratic	1867	William Holden
11	Newton Booth (1825–1892)	December 8, 1871 – February 27, 1875 (1178 days; resigned) (Note: Booth resigned, having been elected to the United States Senate.)	Republican	1871	Romualdo Pacheco
12	Romualdo Pacheco (1831–1899)	February 27, 1875 – December 9, 1875 (286 days; retired) (Note: Pacheco instead ran unsuccessfully for reelection as lieutenant governor.)	Republican	Succeeded from lieutenant governor	William Irwin (acting)
13	William Irwin (1827–1886)	December 9, 1875 – January 8, 1880 (1492 days; retired)	Democratic	1875	James A. Johnson
14	George C. Perkins (1839–1923)	January 8, 1880 – January 10, 1883 (1099 days; retired)	Republican	1879	John Mansfield
15	George Stoneman (1822–1894)	January 10, 1883 – January 8, 1887 (1460 days; retired)	Democratic	1882	John Daggett
16	Washington Bartlett (1824–1887)	January 8, 1887 – September 12, 1887 (248 days; died in office)	Democratic	1886	Robert Waterman (Note: Represented the Republican Party)
17	Robert Waterman (1826–1891)	September 12, 1887 – January 8, 1891 (1215 days; retired)	Republican	Succeeded from lieutenant governor	Stephen M. White (acting)
18	Henry Markham (1840–1923)	January 8, 1891 – January 11, 1895 (1465 days; retired)	Republican	1890	John B. Reddick
19	James Budd (1851–1908)	January 11, 1895 – January 4, 1899 (1455 days; retired)	Democratic	1894	Spencer G. Millard (died October 24, 1895)
19	James Budd (1851–1908)	January 11, 1895 – January 4, 1899 (1455 days; retired)	Democratic	1894	Vacant
19	James Budd (1851–1908)	January 11, 1895 – January 4, 1899 (1455 days; retired)	Democratic	1894	William T. Jeter (appointed October 26, 1895)
20	Henry T. Gage (1852–1924)	January 4, 1899 – January 7, 1903 (1464 days; lost nomination)	Republican	1898	Jacob H. Neff
21	George Pardee (1857–1941)	January 7, 1903 – January 9, 1907 (1464 days; lost nomination)	Republican	1902	Alden Anderson
22	James Gillett (1860–1937)	January 9, 1907 – January 3, 1911 (1456 days; retired)	Republican	1906	Warren R. Porter
23	Hiram Johnson (1866–1945)	January 3, 1911 – March 15, 1917 (2264 days; resigned) (Note: Johnson resigned, having been elected to the United States Senate.)	Republican	1910	Albert Joseph Wallace
23	Hiram Johnson (1866–1945)	January 3, 1911 – March 15, 1917 (2264 days; resigned)	Progressive	1914	John Morton Eshleman (died February 28, 1916)
23	Hiram Johnson (1866–1945)	January 3, 1911 – March 15, 1917 (2264 days; resigned)	Progressive	1914	Vacant
23	Hiram Johnson (1866–1945)	January 3, 1911 – March 15, 1917 (2264 days; resigned)	Progressive	1914	William Stephens (took office July 22, 1916)
24	William Stephens (1859–1944)	March 15, 1917 – January 9, 1923 (2127 days; lost nomination)	Republican	Succeeded from lieutenant governor	Vacant
24	William Stephens (1859–1944)	March 15, 1917 – January 9, 1923 (2127 days; lost nomination)	Republican	1918	C. C. Young
25	Friend Richardson (1865–1943)	January 9, 1923 – January 4, 1927 (1457 days; lost nomination)	Republican	1922	C. C. Young
26	C. C. Young (1869–1947)	January 4, 1927 – January 6, 1931 (1464 days; lost nomination)	Republican	1926	Buron Fitts (resigned November 30, 1928)
26	C. C. Young (1869–1947)	January 4, 1927 – January 6, 1931 (1464 days; lost nomination)	Republican	1926	Vacant
26	C. C. Young (1869–1947)	January 4, 1927 – January 6, 1931 (1464 days; lost nomination)	Republican	1926	Herschel L. Carnahan (appointed December 4, 1928)
27	James Rolph (1869–1934)	January 6, 1931 – June 2, 1934 (1244 days; died in office)	Republican	1930	Frank Merriam
28	Frank Merriam (1865–1955)	June 2, 1934 – January 2, 1939 (1676 days; lost election)	Republican	Succeeded from lieutenant governor	Vacant
28	Frank Merriam (1865–1955)	June 2, 1934 – January 2, 1939 (1676 days; lost election)	Republican	1934	George J. Hatfield
29	Culbert Olson (1876–1962)	January 2, 1939 – January 4, 1943 (1464 days; lost election)	Democratic	1938	Ellis E. Patterson
30	Earl Warren (1891–1974)	January 4, 1943 – October 4, 1953 (3927 days; resigned) (Note: Warren resigned, having been appointed Chief Justice of the United States. His resignation letter specified he would leave office at "12 o'clock midnight, Sunday, Oct 4, 1953".)	Republican (Note: Warren ran as a Republican for his first and third terms. For his second term, he won the nomination of the Republican, Democratic, and Progressive parties.)	1942	Frederick F. Houser
30	Earl Warren (1891–1974)	January 4, 1943 – October 4, 1953 (3927 days; resigned)	Republican	1946	Goodwin Knight
30	Earl Warren (1891–1974)	January 4, 1943 – October 4, 1953 (3927 days; resigned)	Republican	1950	Goodwin Knight
31	Goodwin Knight (1896–1970)	October 5, 1953 – January 5, 1959 (1919 days; retired) (Note: Knight instead ran unsuccessfully for the United States Senate.)	Republican	Succeeded from lieutenant governor	Harold J. Powers
31	Goodwin Knight (1896–1970)	October 5, 1953 – January 5, 1959 (1919 days; retired)	Republican	1954	Harold J. Powers
32	Pat Brown (1905–1996)	January 5, 1959 – January 2, 1967 (2920 days; lost election)	Democratic	1958	Glenn M. Anderson
32	Pat Brown (1905–1996)	January 5, 1959 – January 2, 1967 (2920 days; lost election)	Democratic	1962	Glenn M. Anderson
33	Ronald Reagan (1911–2004)	January 2, 1967 – January 6, 1975 (2927 days; retired)	Republican	1966	Robert Finch (resigned January 8, 1969)
33	Ronald Reagan (1911–2004)	January 2, 1967 – January 6, 1975 (2927 days; retired)	Republican	1966	Edwin Reinecke (resigned October 2, 1974)
33	Ronald Reagan (1911–2004)	January 2, 1967 – January 6, 1975 (2927 days; retired)	Republican	1970	Edwin Reinecke (resigned October 2, 1974)
33	Ronald Reagan (1911–2004)	January 2, 1967 – January 6, 1975 (2927 days; retired)	Republican	1970	John L. Harmer
34	Jerry Brown (b. 1938)	January 6, 1975 – January 3, 1983 (2920 days; retired)	Democratic	1974	Mervyn Dymally
34	Jerry Brown (b. 1938)	January 6, 1975 – January 3, 1983 (2920 days; retired)	Democratic	1978	Mike Curb
35	George Deukmejian (1928–2018)	January 3, 1983 – January 7, 1991 (2927 days; retired)	Republican	1982	Leo T. McCarthy
35	George Deukmejian (1928–2018)	January 3, 1983 – January 7, 1991 (2927 days; retired)	Republican	1986	Leo T. McCarthy
36	Pete Wilson (b. 1933)	January 7, 1991 – January 4, 1999 (2920 days; term-limited) (Note: Under a 1990 amendment to the constitution, governors may not serve more than two terms.)	Republican	1990	Leo T. McCarthy
36	Pete Wilson (b. 1933)	January 7, 1991 – January 4, 1999 (2920 days; term-limited)	Republican	1994	Gray Davis
37	Gray Davis (b. 1942)	January 4, 1999 – November 17, 2003 (1779 days; recalled) (Note: Davis was recalled and Schwarzenegger elected to replace him in a special election.)	Democratic	1998	Cruz Bustamante
37	Gray Davis (b. 1942)	January 4, 1999 – November 17, 2003 (1779 days; recalled)	Democratic	2002	Cruz Bustamante
38	Arnold Schwarzenegger (b. 1947)	November 17, 2003 – January 3, 2011 (2605 days; term-limited)	Republican	2003 (recall)	Cruz Bustamante
38	Arnold Schwarzenegger (b. 1947)	November 17, 2003 – January 3, 2011 (2605 days; term-limited)	Republican	2006	John Garamendi (resigned November 3, 2009)
38	Arnold Schwarzenegger (b. 1947)	November 17, 2003 – January 3, 2011 (2605 days; term-limited)	Republican	2006	Mona Pasquil (acting)
38	Arnold Schwarzenegger (b. 1947)	November 17, 2003 – January 3, 2011 (2605 days; term-limited)	Republican	2006	Abel Maldonado (Note: Newsom delayed his swearing in as lieutenant governor until January 10, 2011, to remain mayor of San Francisco; Maldonado stayed on as lieutenant governor until then.) (appointed April 27, 2010)
39	Jerry Brown (b. 1938)	January 3, 2011 – January 7, 2019 (2927 days; term-limited)	Democratic	2010	Abel Maldonado (appointed April 27, 2010)
39	Jerry Brown (b. 1938)	January 3, 2011 – January 7, 2019 (2927 days; term-limited)	Democratic	2010	Gavin Newsom (took office January 10, 2011)
39	Jerry Brown (b. 1938)	January 3, 2011 – January 7, 2019 (2927 days; term-limited)	Democratic	2014	Gavin Newsom (took office January 10, 2011)
40	Gavin Newsom (b. 1967)	January 7, 2019 – Incumbent (Note: Newsom's second term began on January 6, 2023, and will expire on January 4, 2027; he is term-limited.) (in office 2877 days)	Democratic	2018	Eleni Kounalakis
40	Gavin Newsom (b. 1967)	January 7, 2019 – Incumbent (in office 2877 days)	Democratic	2021 (recall) (Note: Newsom defeated a recall election.)	Eleni Kounalakis
40	Gavin Newsom (b. 1967)	January 7, 2019 – Incumbent (in office 2877 days)	Democratic	2022	Eleni Kounalakis
41	Xavier Becerra (b. 1958)	Governor-elect takes office January 4, 2027	Democratic	2026	Fiona Ma

== See also ==
- Gubernatorial lines of succession in the United States § California
- First ladies and partners of California
- List of lieutenant governors of California
- List of governors of California before 1850
- List of California state legislatures

== Sources ==
- "Former California Governors". National Governors Association.
- "Governors of California". California State Library. Archived from the original on November 2, 2026.
- "California Constitution". State Democracy Research Initiative. University of Wisconsin Law School.
- Dubin, Michael J. (2003). United States Gubernatorial Elections, 1776–1860: The Official Results by State and County. McFarland. ISBN 0-7864-1439-1 – via Internet Archive.
- Glashan, Roy R. (1979). American Governors and Gubernatorial Elections, 1775-1978. Meckler Books. ISBN 0-7201-1511-6 – via Internet Archive.
- Kallenbach, Joseph E.; Kallenbach, Jessamine S. (1977). American State Governors, 1776-1976. Oceana Publications. ISBN 978-0-379-00665-0 – via Internet Archive.
- Mullaney, Marie Marmo (1994). Biographical Directory of the Governors of the United States, 1988–1994. Greenwood Publishing Group. ISBN 0-313-28312-5 – via Internet Archive.
- Sobel, Robert; Raimo, John (1978). Biographical Directory of the Governors of the United States, 1789-1978. Vol. 1. Meckler Books. ISBN 0-930466-01-2 – via Internet Archive.
- Thorpe, Francis Newton, ed. (1909). The Federal and State Constitutions, Colonial Charters, and Other Organic Laws of the States, Territories, and Colonies Now or Heretofore Forming the United States of America. Vol. 1. United States Government Publishing Office – via Internet Archive.
