= Mollie Low =

First lady of California (1863-1867)

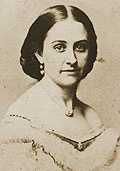

First Lady of California
- In role December 10, 1863 – December 5, 1867
- Governor: Frederick Low
- Preceded by: Jane Stanford
- Succeeded by: Anna Haight

Personal details
- Born: Mollie Creed; January 17, 1840 Lancaster, Ohio, U.S.
- Died: October 1, 1910 (aged 70) San Francisco, California, U.S.
- Resting place: Cypress Lawn Memorial Park
- Spouse: Frederick Low (m. 1857; died 1894)
- Children: 1

Mollie Low (née Creed; January 17, 1840 – October 1, 1910) was First Lady of California, as the wife of Frederick Low, Governor from 1863 to 1867.

== Life ==
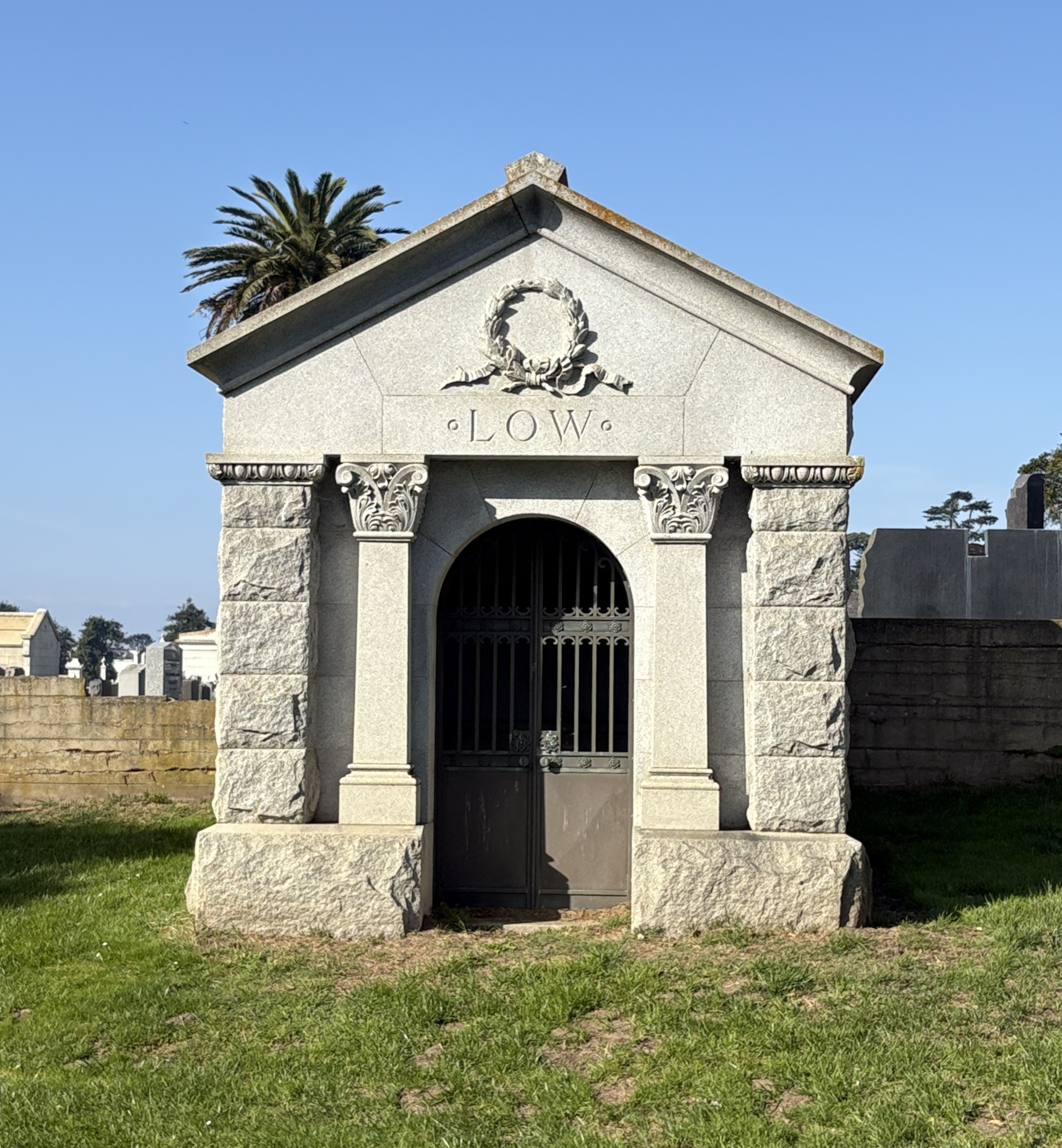
Low mausoleum at Cypress Lawn Memorial Park

She was born Mollie Creed on January 17, 1840 in Lancaster, Ohio to George Creed and Elizabeth (nee Clement).

In 1856 Creed joined her aunt and uncle, Jane (nee Creed) and John C. Hall in Marysville. She married Frederick Low on December 22, 1857, they had one daughter, Flora. The Lows used the Stanford Mansion as Governor's residence. Mollie's hair had turned white while she was still young, and was considered a striking figure. Newspaper society reporters frequently discussed her sense of fashion. Mark Twain described in detail the dress Low wore to the Lick House Ball on 27 September 1863, two weeks after Low had defeated Downey in the election.

After leaving office, Fredrick Low was appointed minister to China. The Lows sailed to China in February 1870, returning to San Francisco in 1874.

Low was an important figure in San Francisco society and lived there until her death on October 1, 1910. She was buried at the Cypress Lawn Cemetery in Colma, California.
