= Anna Haight =

First lady of California (1867-1871)

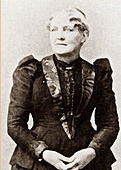

First Lady of California
- In role December 5, 1867 – December 8, 1871
- Governor: Henry Huntly Haight
- Preceded by: Mollie Low
- Succeeded by: Mary McIntire Pacheco

Personal details
- Born: Anna Bissell; October 2, 1834 St. Louis, Missouri, U.S.
- Died: March 29, 1898 (aged 63) Oakland, California, U.S.
- Spouse: Henry Huntly Haight (m. 1855; died 1878)
- Children: 5

Anna Haight (née Bissell; October 2, 1834 – March 29, 1898), was the tenth First Lady of California, being wife of Henry Haight, Governor from 1867 to 1871.

== Life ==
Anna Haight was born Anna Bissell on 2 October 1834 in St. Louis to Captain Lewis Bissell and his wife, the former Mary Woodbridge. Captain Bissell built the house in which Anna grew up; Lewis Bissell House (1820), now a restaurant and banquet facility, is considered to be the oldest surviving house in St. Louis. Anna met Henry Haight, a San Francisco attorney, in St. Louis, and married him on 24 January 1855. They sailed from New York on 20 February, bound for San Francisco. They had five children, Janette, Mary, Dugald, Henry H., Jr. and Louis.

The Haights were the last family to use the Stanford Mansion as the Governor's residence. Anna died on 29 March 1898 in Oakland, California and was buried in Mountain View Cemetery in Oakland.
