= Mary McIntyre =

Mary McIntyre may refer to:

- Mary McIntyre (photographer), Northern Irish photographer
- Mary McIntyre (New Zealand artist) (born 1928), New Zealand painter

== See also ==
- Mary McIntire Pacheco (1842–1913), American novelist and playwright
