= Leland Stanford Mansion =

Historic house in California, United States

- U.S. National Register of Historic Places
- U.S. National Historic Landmark
- California Historical Landmark No. 614
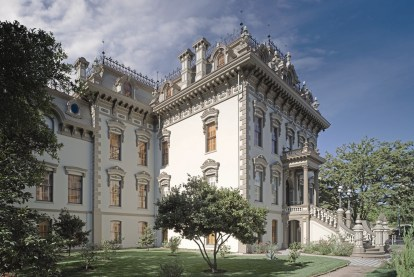

- Location within Sacramento, California Location within California Location within the United States
- Location: 800 N St, Sacramento, California
- Coordinates: 38°34′34.22″N 121°29′52.38″W
- Built: 1856
- Architect: Seth Babson
- Architectural style: Second Empire
- NRHP reference No.: 71000178
- CHISL No.: 614

Significant dates
- Added to NRHP: December 9, 1971
- Designated NHL: May 28, 1987

The Leland Stanford Mansion, often known simply as the Stanford Mansion, is a historic mansion and California State Park in Sacramento, California, which serves as the official reception center for the Government of California and one of the official workplaces of the governor of California.

Built in 1856, the mansion was formerly the residence of Leland Stanford, the 8th governor of California and founder of Stanford University. In 1900, the Stanford family donated the estate to the Roman Catholic Diocese of Sacramento, which operated a children's home there until 1978. Subsequently, the California government purchased the property to serve as the capital's ceremonial reception center and as a state park, officially known as the Leland Stanford Mansion State Historic Park.

== History ==
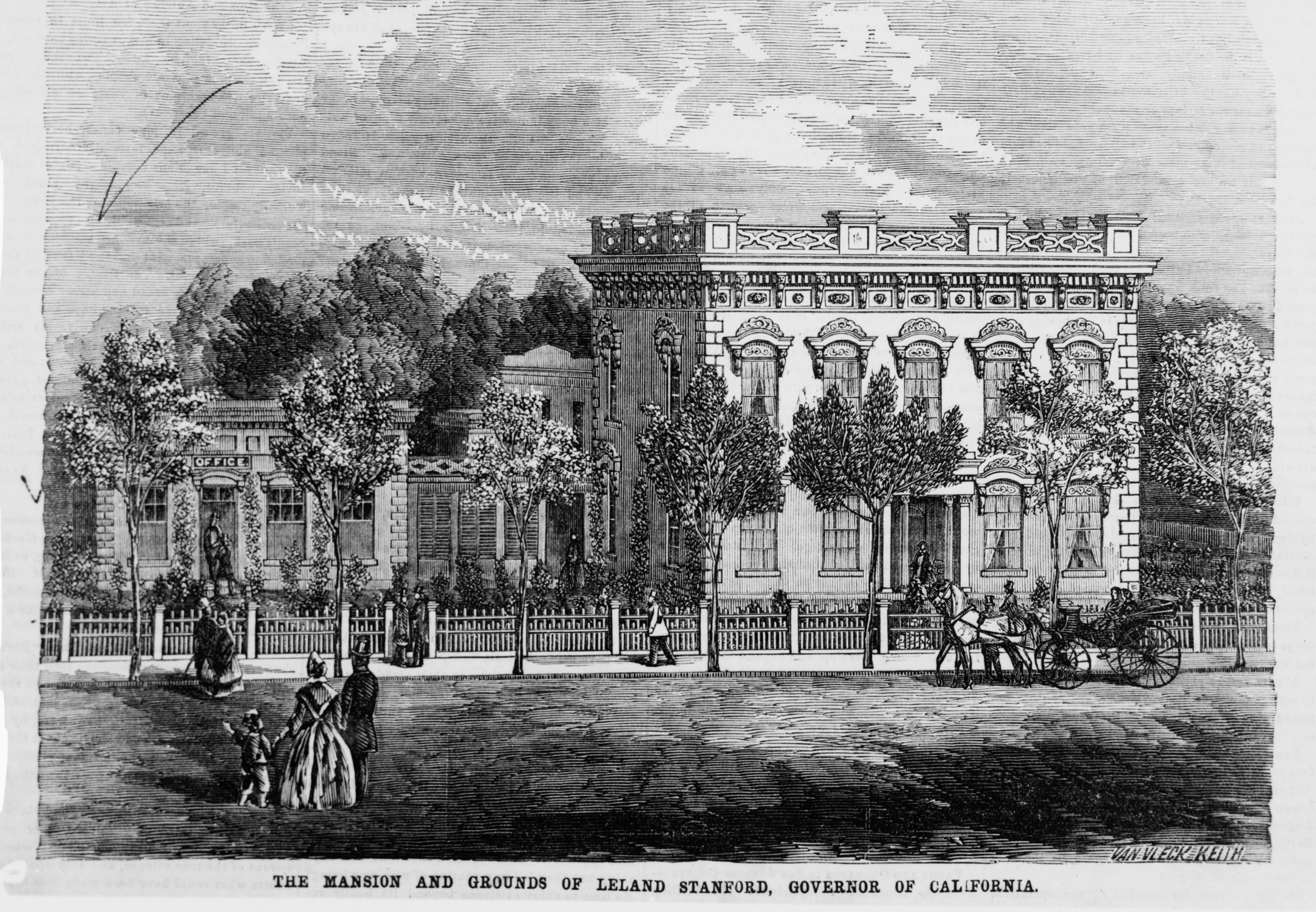
Engraving of the mansion in 1862

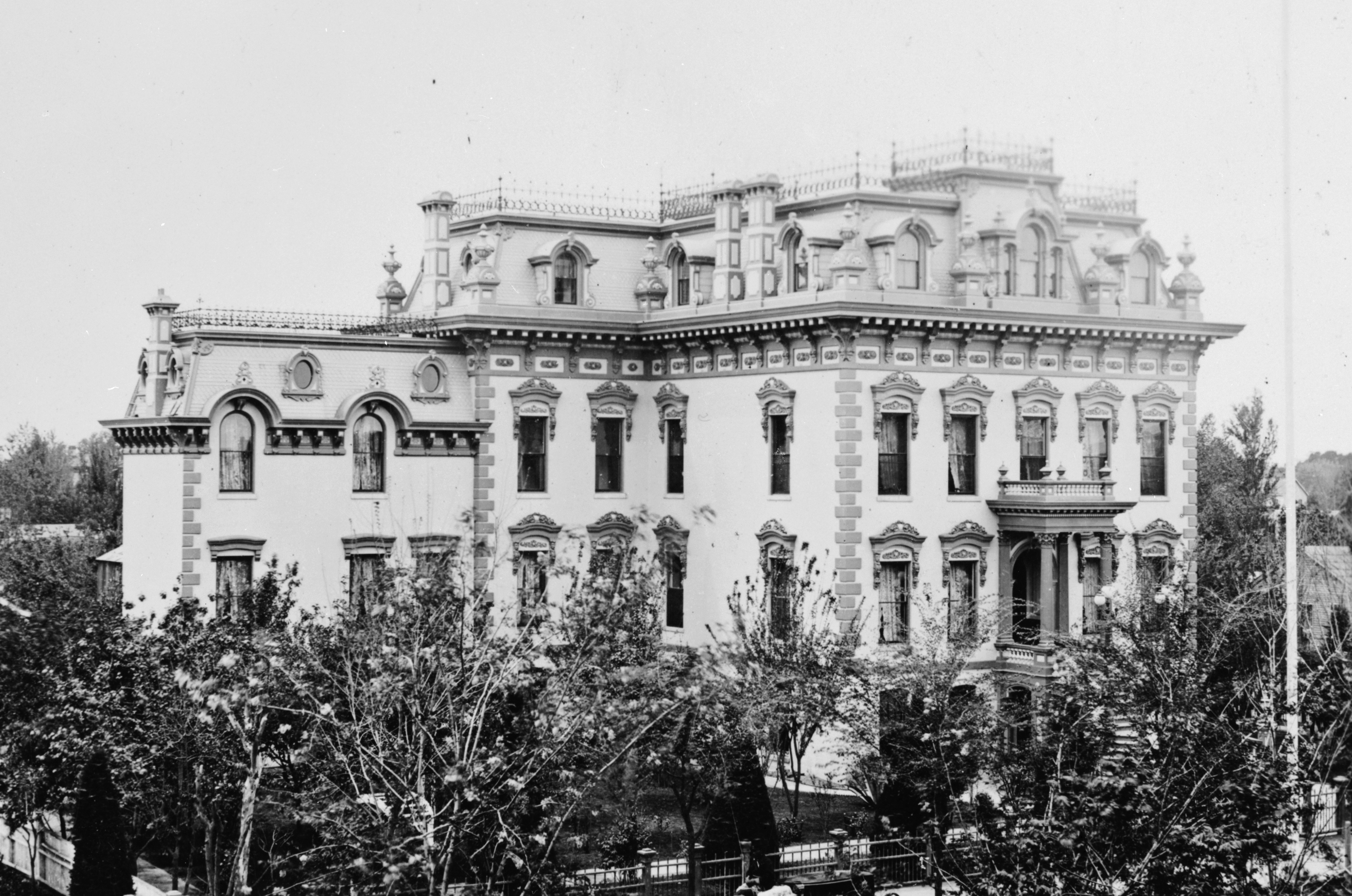
The Stanford Mansion in 1872

Sacramento merchant Shelton C. Fogus, a wealthy building merchant, originally owned and built the home. The Renaissance Revival of the original home is attributed to Seth Babson, who later designed the E.B. Crocker residence and art gallery that are now part of the Crocker Art Museum.

=== Stanford family ===
Leland Stanford, president of the Central Pacific Railroad (one of the Big Four tycoons) and a rising member of the Republican Party, purchased the home for $8,000 (equivalent to $287,000 in 2025) in June 1861, shortly before his election as California governor that year. During his two-year governorship, the Stanford Mansion served as the state's executive office and living quarters. His successors, governors Frederick Low and Henry Huntly Haight, would also use the mansion as their office.

Between 1871 and 1872, the Stanford family remodeled the residence extensively. Because Stanford had to attend his gubernatorial inauguration by rowboat in 1862, the home was raised twelve feet to mitigate frequent flooding from the Sacramento River. In addition, one story was added to both the bottom and top of the mansion. The home was also expanded from 4,000 square feet (370 m^{2}) to 19,000 square feet (1,800 m^{2}), and redesigned to reflect the French Second Empire style popular at the time, particularly in the 4th-floor Mansard roof. The result was a four-story remodeled structure in which the original 2-story house sat between the added floors.

Following Stanford's death in 1893, his widow Jane Lathrop Stanford continued to oversee the home.

=== Diocese of Sacramento ownership ===
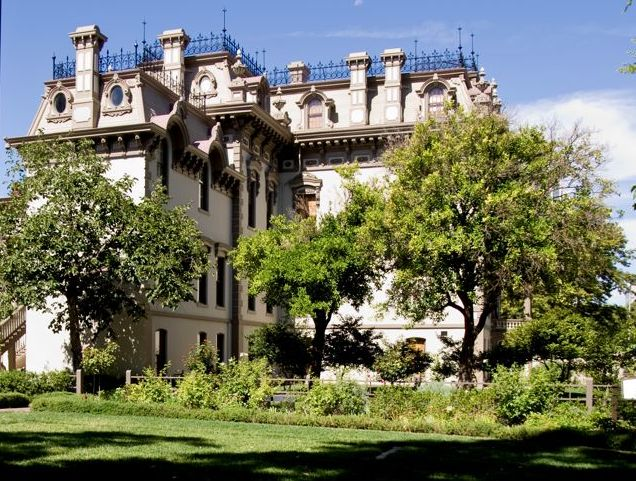
View from the mansion's gardens

In 1900, Jane Stanford donated the home to the Roman Catholic Diocese of Sacramento for the benefit of California's children. It was given to the Sisters of Mercy who ran it as an orphanage named the Stanford and Lathrop Memorial Home for Friendless Children.

In 1932, the home was given to the Sisters of Social Service who eventually transformed the mansion from an orphanage to a residence for dependent high school girls. A fire in the mansion in 1940 caused considerable damage to the fourth floor.

The mansion was designated a California Historical Landmark in 1957 and a National Historic Landmark in 1987.

=== Official reception house and state park ===
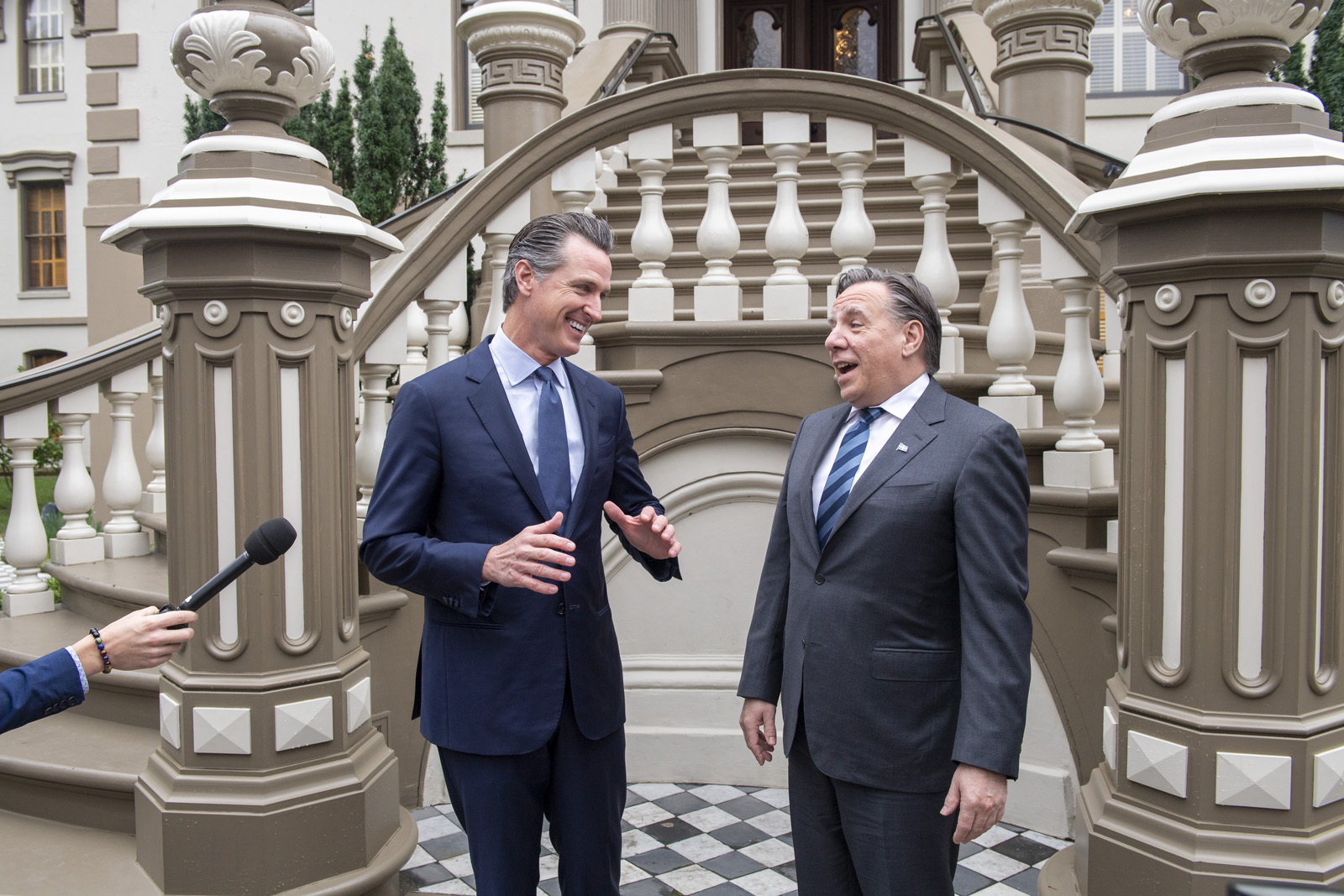
Governor Gavin Newsom meeting with François Legault, Premier of Quebec, at the Stanford Mansion

In 1978, the government of California acquired the property for use as a state park. The Sisters of Social Services remained on the grounds until 1987, when California State Parks designated the mansion and the immediate surrounding land as a state historic park. Following the state's decision, the National Park Service declared the mansion a National Historic Landmark on May 28, 1987. After $22 million in renovation and rehabilitation, the mansion finally opened to public tours in September 2005.

The mansion is also the state's official reception center for leaders from around the world.

Prior to the reopening of the mansion, California did not have a location for hosting official functions for nearly 40 years. Today, the Government of California frequently uses the mansion to host foreign dignitaries, and the governor retains an office there. Tours of the mansion are offered daily but may be impacted by official functions on behalf of the Governor's Office or the California State Legislature leadership.

=== Restoration ===
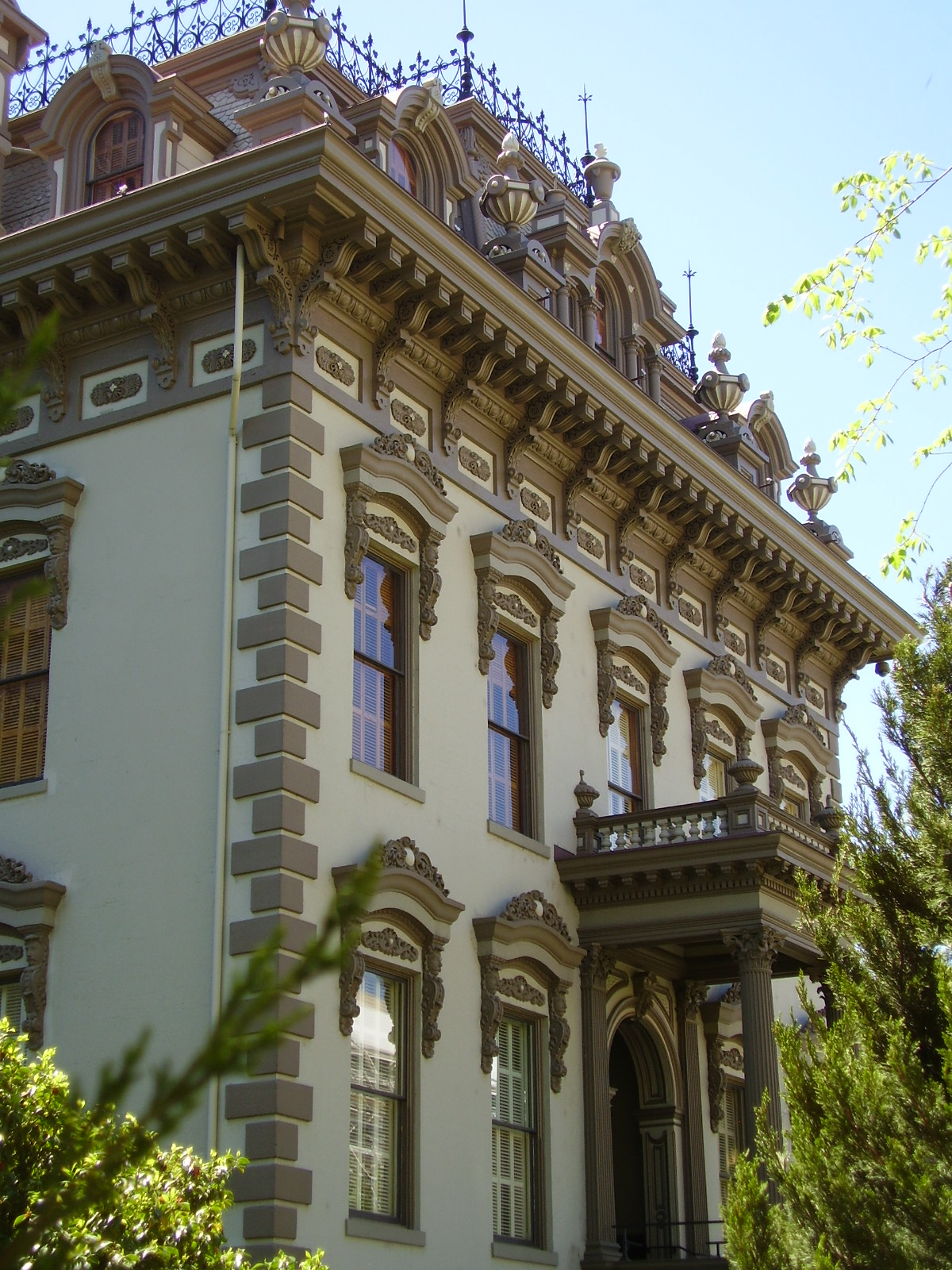
The mansion is built in a Renaissance Revival (Second Empire) style.

Beginning in 1991, the Stanford Mansion underwent a 14-year renovation at a cost of $22 million ($52 million in 2025), with the help of Sacramento businessman and former Stanford University professor Peter McCuen. Accurate restoration of the home and its rooms was aided by an extensive study of the home in 1986 through the Historic American Buildings Survey and by a large collection of photographs of the home taken in 1868 by Alfred A. Hart and again in 1872 by Eadweard Muybridge.

The repairs and restoration were completed in 2005, when the mansion opened to the public. California State Parks offers guided tours through the fully refurbished home, with rooms restored to their 1872 appearance. The Leland Stanford Mansion is physically accessible, including the gardens, Visitor Center, and restrooms. Elevators provide access to the upper floors of the mansion's tour route, and a tactile model of the Mansion is available in the Visitor Center.

== See also ==
- California Governor's Mansion
- History of Sacramento, California
- National Register of Historic Places listings in Sacramento County, California
- California Historical Landmarks in Sacramento County, California
