= Mary McIntire Pacheco =

American novelist and playwright (1842–1913)

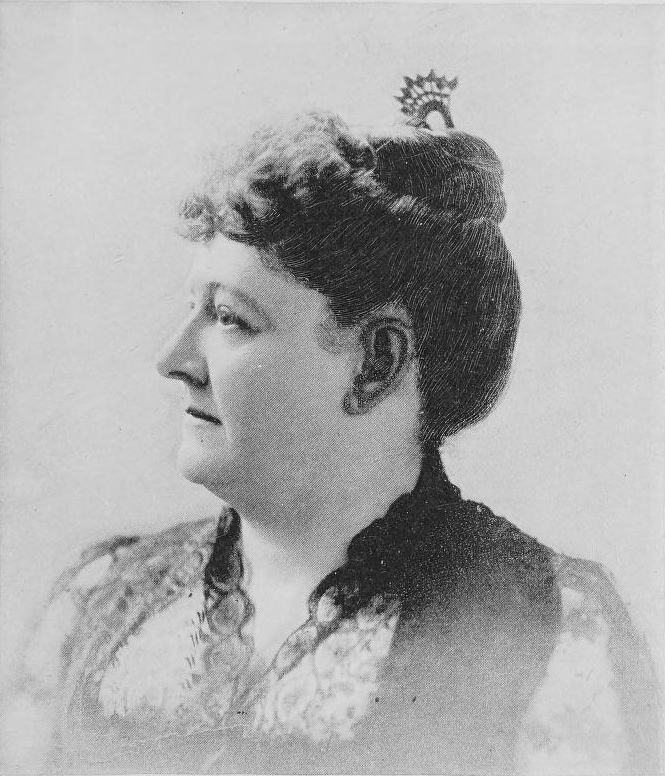
- McIntire Pacheco c. 1895

First Lady of California
- In role February 27, 1875 – December 9, 1875
- Governor: Romualdo Pacheco
- Preceded by: Anna Haight
- Succeeded by: Amelia Irwin

Personal details
- Born: Mary Catherine McIntire; January 22, 1842 Madison, Indiana, U.S.
- Died: November 5, 1913 (aged 71) Oakland, California, U.S.
- Spouse: Romualdo Pacheco (m. 1863; died 1899)
- Children: 2
- Occupation: Writer, playwright

Mary Catherine McIntire Pacheco (née McIntire; January 22, 1842 — November 5, 1913) was an American novelist and playwright. The wife of California governor Romualdo Pacheco, she was First Lady of California during her husband's term in 1875.

== Early life ==
Mary Catherine McIntire was born in Madison, Indiana (or possibly Danville, Kentucky), the daughter of David McIntire and Sarah J. Handley McIntire. She moved to California in the late 1850s, with her mother and sisters, after her father died.

== Career ==
She published a novel, Montalban, in 1874, which placed her "among the first of the women writers of California". Theatrical works by Pacheco include plays Betrayed, Loyal Til Death, Incog, Malisoff, To Nemesis; or, Love and Hate, American Assurance (later revamped as Nothing But Money), Don Roberto, Tom, Dick, and Harry, Loyal Unto Death, The Leading Man, The Two Johnnies, and Three Twins (1908, a musical).

In her life as a politician's wife, Pacheco lived in Sacramento and was, for ten months in 1875, the First Lady of California. (Her husband became the state's first California-born governor when he finished the term of Newton Booth.) She hosted a literary salon in San Francisco, drawing "all that were worth knowing in California", according to Western writer Bret Harte. She was a member of the Pacific Coast Women's Press Association.

== Personal life ==
Mary Catherine McIntire married Romualdo Pacheco in 1863, at St. Mary's Cathedral in San Francisco. They had two children, Maybella Ramona (later Mrs. William S. Tevis) and Romualdo Jr. Their son died at age 6 in 1871. Mary Pacheco was widowed in 1899, and died in 1913, aged 71 years, in Oakland, California.
