= 1863 California gubernatorial election =

- September 2, 1863
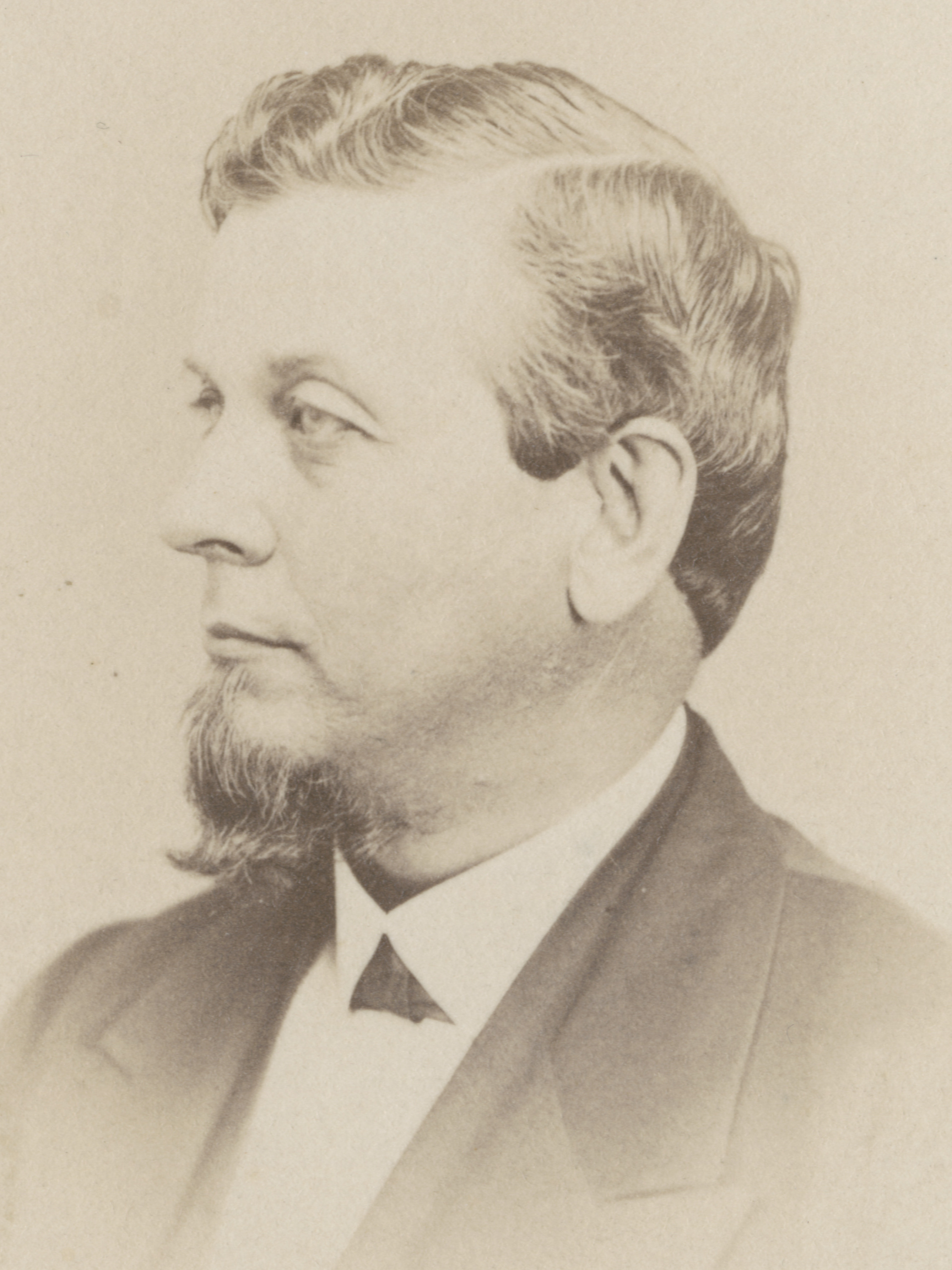

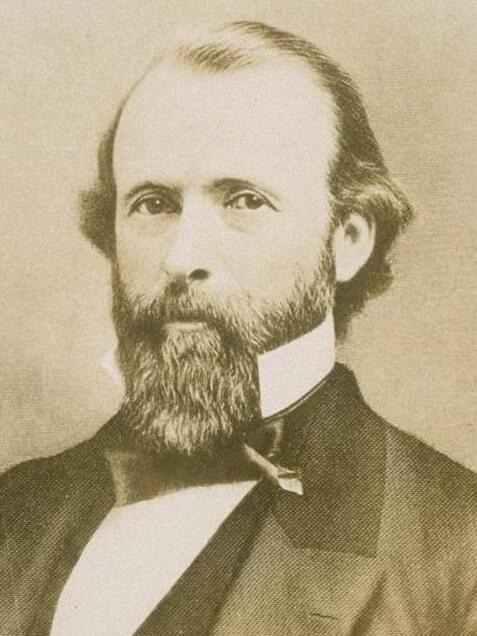
Nominee	Frederick Low	John G. Downey
Party	National Union	Democratic
Popular vote	64,283	44,622
Percentage	59.03%	40.97%
County results
Low
50–60%
60–70%
70–80%
Downey
50–60%
70–80%
80–90%
Governor before election
Leland Stanford
Republican
Elected Governor
Frederick Low
Republican

The 1863 California gubernatorial election was held on September 2, 1863, to elect the governor of California. Former governor John G. Downey was unsuccessful in his bid for reelection to a second, non-consecutive term, losing to former United States Representative Frederick Low. This was the state's first gubernatorial election for a four-year term; previous governors had only served two-year terms.

== Results ==
California gubernatorial election, 1863
Party	Candidate	Votes	%	±%
National Union	Frederick Low	64,283	59.03%	+12.22%
Democratic	John G. Downey	44,622	40.97%	−12.23%
	Scattering	1	0.00%	
Total votes		108,906	100.00%	
Majority		19,661	18.05%	
National Union hold		Swing	-1.39%	

=== Results by county ===
County (Note: No return from Lake County)	Frederick Low National Union		John G. Downey Democratic		Scattering Write-in		Margin		Total votes cast
County	#	%	#	%	#	%	#	%	Total votes cast
Alameda	1,404	63.59%	804	36.41%	0	0.00%	600	27.17%	2,208
Amador	2,245	52.10%	2,064	47.90%	0	0.00%	181	4.20%	4,309
Butte	1,876	55.73%	1,490	44.27%	0	0.00%	386	11.47%	3,366
Calaveras	2,278	52.89%	2,029	47.11%	0	0.00%	249	5.78%	4,307
Colusa	479	45.93%	564	54.07%	0	0.00%	-85	-8.15%	1,043
Contra Costa	1,064	66.58%	534	33.42%	0	0.00%	-530	-33.17%	1,598
Del Norte	184	54.76%	152	45.24%	0	0.00%	32	9.52%	336
El Dorado	3,210	60.01%	2,139	39.99%	0	0.00%	1,071	20.02%	5,349
Fresno	83	18.00%	378	82.00%	0	0.00%	-295	-63.99%	461
Humboldt	502	71.92%	196	28.08%	0	0.00%	306	43.84%	698
Klamath	204	50.62%	199	49.38%	0	0.00%	5	1.24%	403
Los Angeles	702	41.69%	982	58.31%	0	0.00%	-280	-16.63%	1,684
Marin	640	56.69%	489	43.31%	0	0.00%	151	13.37%	1,129
Mariposa	835	47.55%	921	52.45%	0	0.00%	-86	-4.90%	1,756
Mendocino	632	52.54%	571	47.46%	0	0.00%	61	5.07%	1,203
Merced	95	22.41%	329	77.59%	0	0.00%	-234	-55.19%	424
Mono	1,009	59.21%	695	40.79%	0	0.00%	314	18.43%	1,704
Monterey	522	50.73%	507	49.27%	0	0.00%	15	1.46%	1,029
Napa	898	57.64%	660	42.36%	0	0.00%	238	15.28%	1,558
Nevada	2,882	62.14%	1,756	37.86%	0	0.00%	1,126	24.28%	4,638
Placer	2,057	55.94%	1,620	44.06%	0	0.00%	437	11.88%	3,677
Plumas	1,288	62.71%	766	37.29%	0	0.00%	522	25.41%	2,054
Sacramento	3,553	64.64%	1,944	35.36%	0	0.00%	1,609	29.27%	5,497
San Bernardino	361	48.98%	376	51.02%	0	0.00%	-15	-2.04%	737
San Diego	116	46.77%	132	53.23%	0	0.00%	-16	-6.45%	248
San Francisco	9,261	62.94%	5,452	37.06%	0	0.00%	3,809	25.89%	14,713
San Joaquin	1,981	57.35%	1,473	42.65%	0	0.00%	508	14.71%	3,454
San Luis Obispo	260	54.28%	219	45.72%	0	0.00%	41	8.56%	479
San Mateo	834	71.04%	340	28.96%	0	0.00%	494	42.08%	1,174
Santa Barbara	481	77.08%	143	22.92%	0	0.00%	338	54.17%	624
Santa Clara	2,034	57.15%	1,525	42.85%	0	0.00%	509	14.30%	3,559
Santa Cruz	904	69.17%	403	30.83%	0	0.00%	501	38.33%	1,307
Shasta	936	60.27%	617	39.73%	0	0.00%	319	20.54%	1,553
Sierra	2,380	64.62%	1,303	35.38%	0	0.00%	1,077	29.24%	3,683
Siskiyou	1,053	51.29%	999	48.66%	1	0.05%	54	2.63%	2,053
Solano	1,521	57.50%	1,124	42.50%	0	0.00%	397	15.01%	2,645
Sonoma	1,700	49.82%	1,712	50.18%	0	0.00%	-12	-0.35%	3,412
Stanislaus	347	46.51%	399	53.49%	0	0.00%	-52	-6.97%	746
Sutter	718	51.40%	679	48.60%	0	0.00%	39	2.79%	1,397
Tehama	533	54.06%	453	45.94%	0	0.00%	80	8.11%	986
Trinity	785	56.52%	604	43.48%	0	0.00%	181	13.03%	1,389
Tulare	610	46.04%	715	53.96%	0	0.00%	-105	-7.92%	1,325
Tuolumne	1,813	49.31%	1,864	50.69%	0	0.00%	-51	-1.39%	3,677
Yolo	865	52.97%	768	47.03%	0	0.00%	97	5.94%	1,633
Yuba	1,989	58.81%	1,393	41.19%	0	0.00%	596	17.62%	3,382
Soldiers	4,159	96.74%	140	3.26%	0	0.00%	4,019	93.49%	4,299
Total	64,283	59.03%	44,622	40.97%	1	0.00%	19,661	18.05%	108,906

==== Counties that flipped from Democratic to National Union ====
- Del Norte
- Klamath
- Mendocino
- Mono
- San Luis Obispo
- Santa Barbara
- Shasta
- Siskiyou
- Sutter
- Tehama

==== Counties that flipped from National Union to Democratic ====
- San Diego
- Tuolumne
