= 1871 California gubernatorial election =

- September 6, 1871
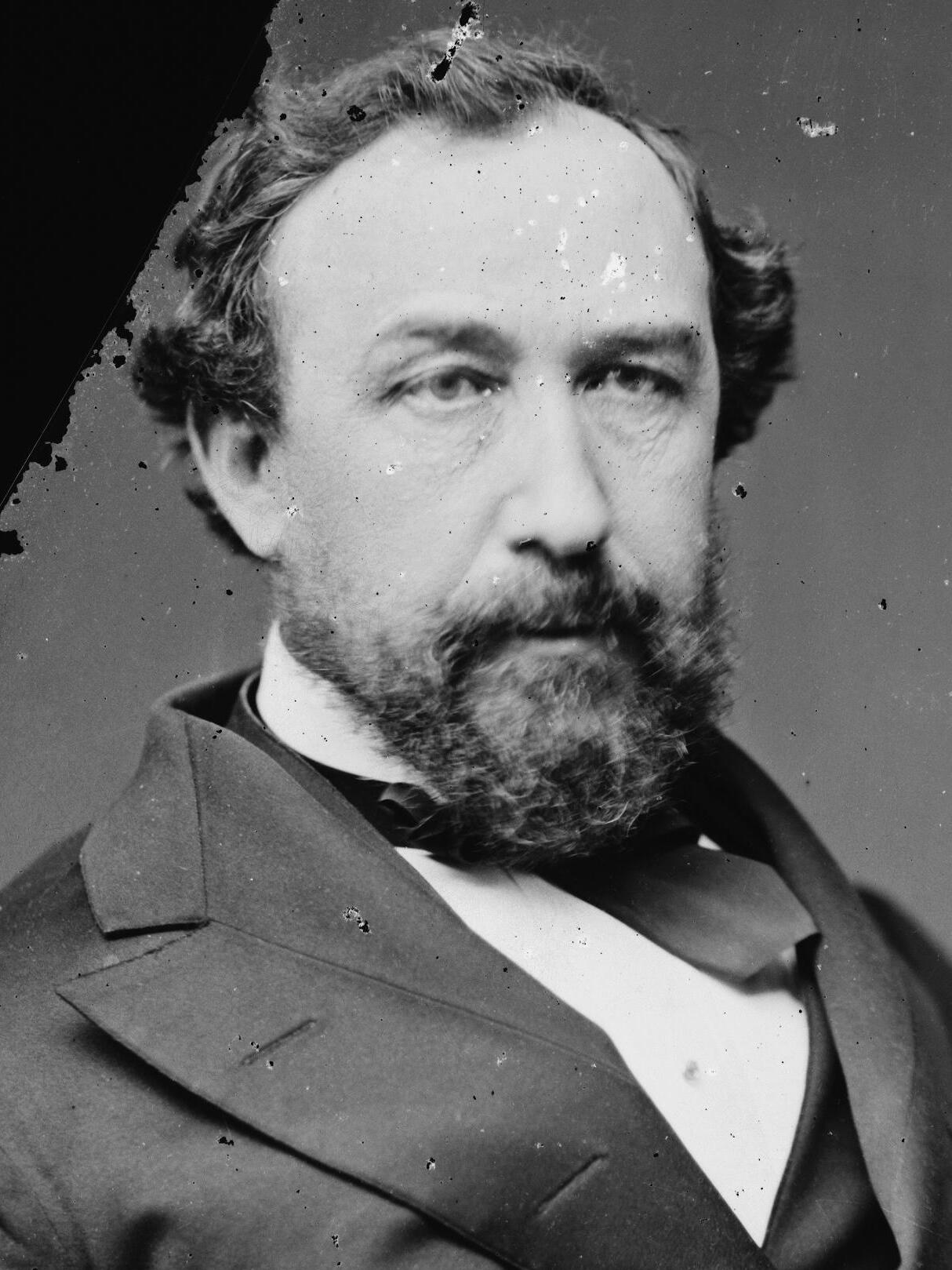

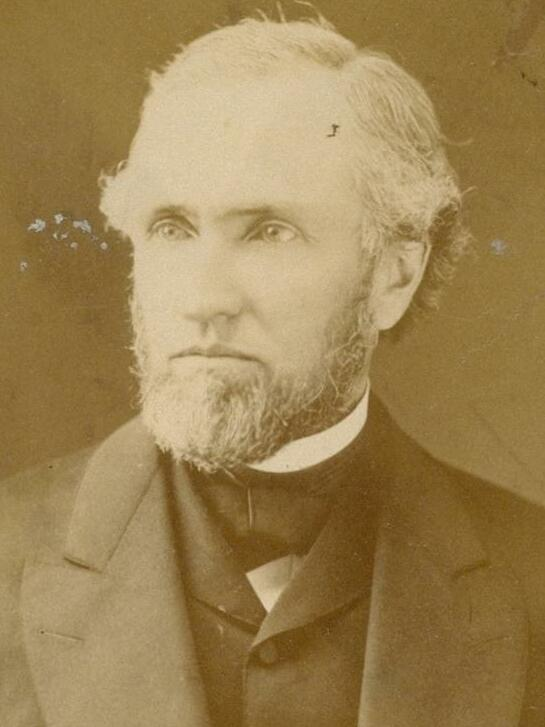
Nominee	Newton Booth	Henry Huntly Haight
Party	Republican	Democratic
Popular vote	61,819	56,800
Percentage	52.12%	47.88%
County results
Booth
50–60%
60–70%
Haight
50–60%
60–70%
70–80%
80–90%
Governor before election
H. H. Haight
Democratic
Elected Governor
Newton Booth
Republican

The 1871 California gubernatorial election was held on September 6, 1871, to elect the governor of California. Incumbent Henry Haight lost his bid for reelection.

== Results ==
California gubernatorial election, 1871
Party	Candidate	Votes	%	±%
Republican	Newton Booth	61,819	52.12%	+8.41%
Democratic	Henry Huntly Haight (incumbent)	56,800	47.88%	−6.15%
	Scattering	1	0.00%	
Majority		5,019	4.23%	
Total votes		118,620	100.00%	
Republican gain from Democratic				

=== Results by county ===
County	Newton Booth Republican		Henry H. Haight Democratic		Scattering Write-in		Margin		Total votes cast
County	#	%	#	%	#	%	#	%	Total votes cast
Alameda	2,489	61.31	1,571	38.69	0	0.00%	918	22.61	4,060
Alpine	136	59.91%	91	40.09%	0	0.00%	45	19.82%	227
Amador	1,132	51.57%	1,063	48.43%	0	0.00%	69	3.14%	2,195
Butte	1,458	49.22%	1,504	50.78%	0	0.00%	-46	-1.55%	2,962
Calaveras	1,062	47.73%	1,163	52.27%	0	0.00%	-101	-4.54%	2,225
Colusa	497	35.20%	915	64.80%	0	0.00%	-418	-29.60%	1,412
Contra Costa	1,066	60.29%	702	39.71%	0	0.00%	364	20.59%	1,768
Del Norte	188	47.00%	212	53.00%	0	0.00%	-24	-6.00%	400
El Dorado	1,532	49.66%	1,553	50.34%	0	0.00%	-21	-0.68%	3,085
Fresno	130	17.83%	599	82.17%	0	0.00%	-469	-64.33%	729
Humboldt	1,094	62.73%	650	37.27%	0	0.00%	444	25.46%	1,744
Inyo	264	45.91%	311	54.09%	0	0.00%	-47	-8.17%	575
Kern	171	32.02%	363	67.98%	0	0.00%	-192	-35.96%	534
Klamath	151	37.66%	250	62.34%	0	0.00%	-99	-24.69%	401
Lake	269	33.88%	525	66.12%	0	0.00%	-256	-32.24%	794
Lassen	248	56.62%	190	43.38%	0	0.00%	58	13.24%	438
Los Angeles	1,421	40.62%	2,077	59.38%	0	0.00%	-656	-18.75%	3,498
Marin	687	55.54%	550	44.46%	0	0.00%	137	11.08%	1,237
Mariposa	541	44.49%	675	55.51%	0	0.00%	-134	-11.02%	1,216
Mendocino	694	38.38%	1,114	61.62%	0	0.00%	-420	-23.23%	1,808
Merced	152	25.76%	438	74.24%	0	0.00%	-286	-48.47%	590
Mono	117	58.21%	84	41.79%	0	0.00%	33	16.42%	201
Monterey	1,129	48.43%	1,202	51.57%	0	0.00%	-73	-3.13%	2,331
Napa	979	54.09%	831	45.91%	0	0.00%	148	8.18%	1,810
Nevada	2,462	52.51%	2,227	47.49%	0	0.00%	235	5.01%	4,689
Placer	1,698	56.08%	1,330	43.92%	0	0.00%	368	12.15%	3,028
Plumas	645	51.77%	601	48.23%	0	0.00%	44	3.53%	1,246
Sacramento	3,734	58.52%	2,647	41.48%	0	0.00%	1,087	17.03%	6,381
San Bernardino	413	44.03%	525	55.97%	0	0.00%	-112	-11.94%	938
San Diego	631	49.11%	654	50.89%	0	0.00%	-23	-1.79%	1,285
San Francisco	13,977	55.92%	11,018	44.08%	0	0.00%	2,959	11.84%	24,995
San Joaquin	2,006	52.66%	1,803	47.34%	0	0.00%	203	5.33%	3,809
San Luis Obispo	563	49.00%	586	51.00%	0	0.00%	-23	-2.00%	1,149
San Mateo	925	58.73%	650	41.27%	0	0.00%	275	17.46%	1,575
Santa Barbara (Note: Not included in the official canvass)	762	51.42%	720	48.58%	0	0.00%	42	2.83%	1,482
Santa Clara	2,772	53.13%	2,444	46.85%	1	0.02%	328	6.29%	5,217
Santa Cruz	1,213	60.95%	777	39.05%	0	0.00%	436	21.91%	1,990
Shasta	638	49.73%	645	50.27%	0	0.00%	-7	-0.55%	1,283
Sierra	1,173	64.95%	633	35.05%	0	0.00%	540	29.90%	1,806
Siskiyou	872	44.20%	1,101	55.80%	0	0.00%	-229	-11.61%	1,973
Solano	2,701	66.49%	1,361	33.51%	0	0.00%	1,340	32.99%	4,062
Sonoma	1,881	42.82%	2,512	57.18%	0	0.00%	-631	-14.36%	4,393
Stanislaus	527	39.21%	817	60.79%	0	0.00%	-290	-21.58%	1,344
Sutter	630	48.69%	664	51.31%	0	0.00%	-34	-2.63%	1,294
Tehama	542	47.25%	605	52.75%	0	0.00%	-63	-5.49%	1,147
Trinity	429	50.41%	422	49.59%	0	0.00%	7	0.82%	851
Tulare	437	38.57%	696	61.43%	0	0.00%	-259	-22.86%	1,133
Tuolumne	899	45.29%	1,086	54.71%	0	0.00%	-187	-9.42%	1,985
Yolo	1,064	48.58%	1,126	51.42%	0	0.00%	-62	-2.83%	2,190
Yuba	1,380	52.73%	1,237	47.27%	0	0.00%	143	5.46%	2,617
Total (Note: Does not include the votes from Santa Barbara County)	61,819	52.12%	56,800	47.88%	1	0.00%	5,019	4.23%	118,620

==== Counties that flipped from Democratic to Republican ====
- Amador
- Napa
- Nevada
- Sacramento
- San Francisco
- Santa Clara
- Yuba

==== Counties that flipped from Republican to Democratic ====
- San Luis Obispo
- Shasta
