= John G. Downey =

Irish-American politician and California Governor

John Gately Downey
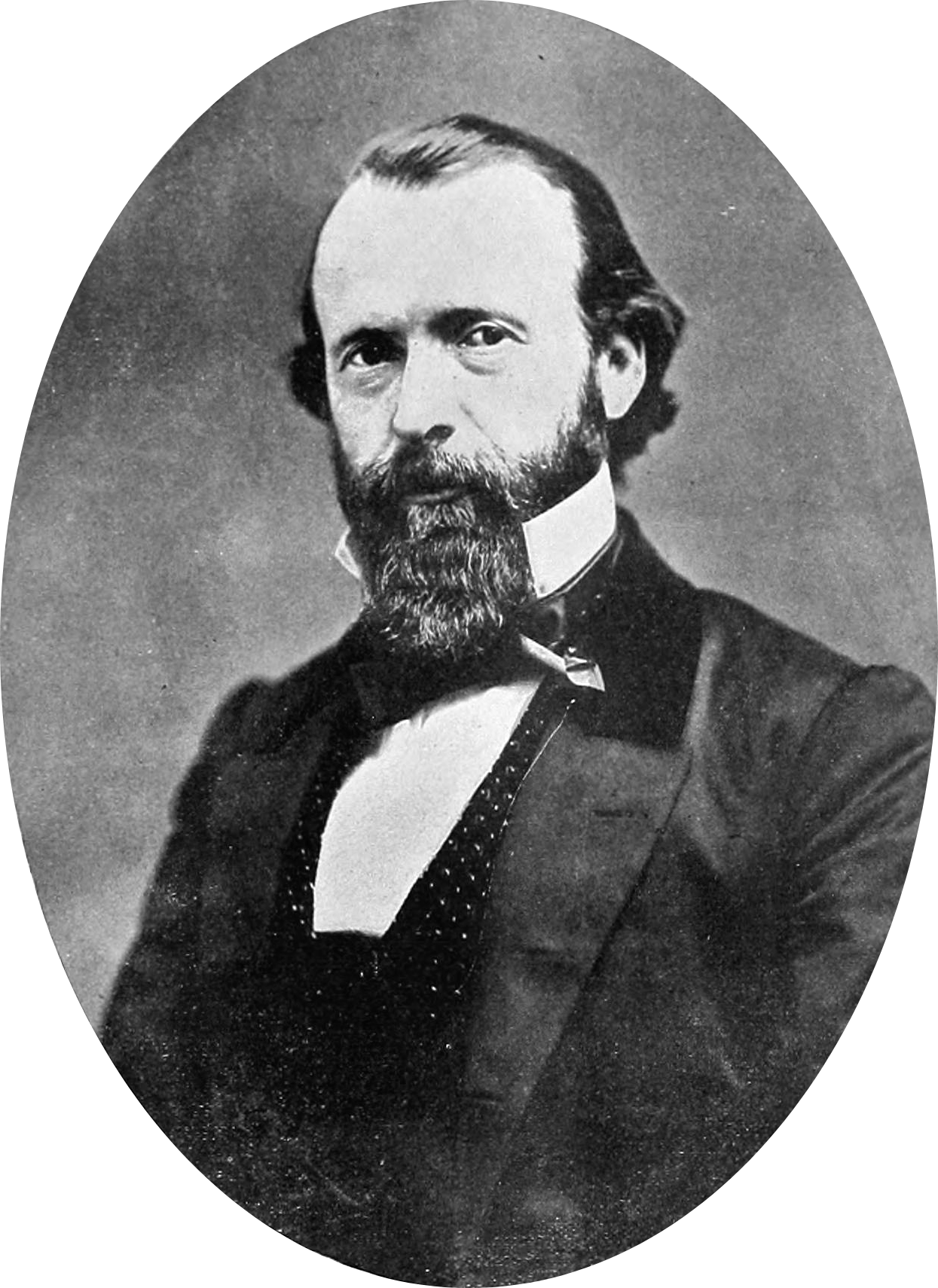

7th Governor of California
- In office January 14, 1860 – January 10, 1862
- Lieutenant: Isaac N. Quinn (acting); Pablo de la Guerra (acting)
- Preceded by: Milton Latham
- Succeeded by: Leland Stanford

6th Lieutenant Governor of California
- In office January 9, 1860 – January 14, 1860
- Governor: Milton Latham
- Preceded by: John Walkup
- Succeeded by: Isaac N. Quinn (acting)

Member of the California State Assembly from the 1st district
- In office January 7, 1856 – January 5, 1857
- Preceded by: Multi-member district
- Succeeded by: Multi-member district

Personal details
- Born: June 24, 1827 Taghmaconnell, County Roscommon, Ireland
- Died: March 1, 1894 (aged 66) Los Angeles, California, US
- Party: Lecompton Democrat
- Spouse(s): Maria Guirado (d. 1883); Rosa V. Kelly
- Profession: Apothecary
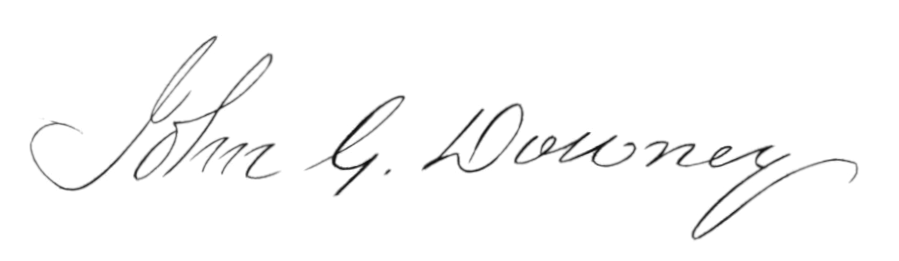
- Signature

John Gately Downey (June 24, 1827 – March 1, 1894) was an Irish-American politician and the seventh governor of California from January 14, 1860, to January 10, 1862. He was the first governor of California born outside the United States and the first to live in Southern California.

== Early years ==
Downey was born on June 24, 1827, in the townland of Castlesampson, Taughmaconnell, County Roscommon, Ireland, to Denis Downey and Bridget Gately. Castlesampson is 12 kilometres west of the town of Athlone. He emigrated with his family at the age of 14 to the United States in 1842, before the famine years. Settling in Charles County, Maryland, the family joined two stepsisters who had already settled in the U.S. Dwindling family finances forced him to halt his education at age 16 and start working toward independence. He apprenticed at an apothecary in Washington, D.C. until 1846.

== Career ==
Downey relocated to Cincinnati, Ohio, where he worked as a druggist. Like many who heard about the California Gold Rush, he went to the West Coast of the United States. He stopped along the way at Vicksburg, Mississippi; then Havana, Cuba and finally New Orleans, Louisiana. By 1849, he had arrived in California, briefly prospecting in Grass Valley before finding a job at a drug store in San Francisco.

Downey soon moved to Los Angeles and was elected for a one-year term to the Los Angeles Common Council in May 1852 and again in May 1856. He resigned from the council in December 1856.

A Lecompton Democrat who favored slavery in the Kansas Territory, Downey was elected as a member of the California State Assembly, the lower house of the State Legislature, for the 1st District, serving from 1856 to 1857. In the 1859 general elections, he was elected lieutenant governor, overcoming the split within the Democratic Party between Lecompton and Anti-Lecompton Democrats, as well as fending off a challenge from the infant Republican Party.

=== Governorship ===
Five days after Downey was sworn in as lieutenant governor, Governor Milton Latham resigned after being elected (by the Legislature) to fill the U.S. Senate vacancy left by the death of David C. Broderick, killed in a duel in 1859. He assumed the governorship on January 14, 1860.

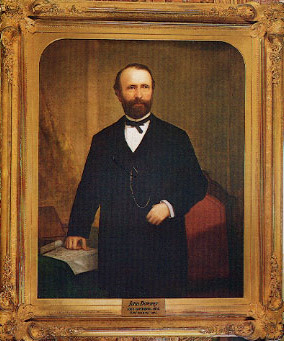
Governor John G. Downey by William F. Cogswell

During Downey's governorship, the Assembly and Senate passed the "Bulkhead Bill," a highly controversial bill heavily supported by San Francisco capitalists. It would have placed the city's waterfront in the hands of private companies within monopolies. Despite support for the bill among San Francisco's wealthy, local merchants and the public alike were in staunch opposition. In a move that stunned many wealthy former supporters, Downey vetoed the Bulkhead Bill, writing:

[I]ts provisions are not only in conflict with the constitution and the principles of natural justice, but that the measure as a whole is calculated to work irreparable injury to our commerce, internal and external, of which San Francisco is and must forever remain a metropolis.

Downey's veto was widely popular in San Francisco and throughout California, and it marked the peak of his popularity. Visiting the city shortly afterward, he was greeted as a hero. But supporters of the Bulkhead Bill never forgave the governor. During a later visit to San Francisco, he described a protester as a "bulkheader". The man responded with a fist fight, broken up only when his supporters physically restrained his opponent.

At the 1860 presidential election, the Democratic Party again splintered. Anti-Lecomptons favored Stephen A. Douglas, while Lecomptons supported John C. Breckinridge. Previously part of the Lecompton faction, Downey sided with Anti-Lecomptons, supporting Douglas in his failed bid against Abraham Lincoln.

=== American Civil War ===
By the outbreak of the American Civil War, Downey pledged support to the Union, responding to requests by U.S. Secretary of War Simon Cameron for California troop assistance. What support he gave remains vague. According to Victorian historian Theodore H. Hittell:

Downey's unionism, it was very plain, was not of the kind by which the Union could be preserved. It meant continued submission and subserviency to slavery and the slave power, which had hitherto dominated the country while the advance of the age had outgrown it ... It cannot be said that Downey had any special love for slavery or the slave power; on the contrary, he had to a very considerable extent broken loose of the chivalry and what was called an Anti-Lecompton Democrat; but unfortunately for himself, he was still hampered with old-time doctrines when slavery ruled unquestioned ...

With the Civil War in its first stages by the 1861 general elections, Downey's earlier support generated by his veto of the Bulkhead Bill had all but evaporated. The Democratic Party again splintered violently over slavery and the Union. Despite turning away from the Lecompton "Breckinridge" faction, he lost the nomination of the Anti-Lecompton "Unionist" Democrats during the state Democratic convention. During the election, the Republican Party capitalized on the Democratic split and won the elections. Californians voted for Leland Stanford over Breckinridge Democrat John R. McConnell and Unionist Democrat John Conness.

In 1863, the Democratic factions reunited and Downey won a unified nomination for governor. In the general election, he lost to his Republican opponent, former congressman Frederick F. Low. This effectively ended Downey's political career.

=== Bank and university foundings ===
Downey returned to Southern California after leaving politics. In 1871, he helped found Farmers and Merchants Bank, the first successful bank in Los Angeles, with Isaias W. Hellman, a banker, philanthropist and future president of Wells Fargo.

In 1879, Downey joined some public-spirited citizens led by Judge Robert Maclay Widney, in laying the groundwork for the University of Southern California, the first university in the region. When Widney formed a board of trustees, he secured a donation of 308 lots of land from three prominent members of the community: Ozro W. Childs, a Protestant horticulturist; Hellman, a German-Jew; and Downey. The gift provided land for a campus as well as a source of endowment, the seeds of financial support for the nascent institution. Downey Street on the USC campus is named after him.

== Train plunge, remarriage, ranch disputes and death ==
Downey later in life

In 1883, Downey and his wife, Maria Jesus Guirado, the daughter of a prominent Mexican gentleman of Sonora, were involved in a train accident at Tehachapi Pass, when their train plunged into a ravine. A porter pulled Downey from the burning wreckage, but his wife's charred body was misidentified and taken to San Francisco for burial. Later her remains were correctly identified and she was re-buried at Old Calvary Cemetery in Los Angeles. "Nervous shock" (today called post-traumatic stress disorder) affected Downey for the rest of his life.

Following the accident, Downey's friend Frank M. Pixley introduced him to the 20-year-old Yda Hillis Addis, a new writer at Pixley's San Francisco journal The Argonaut. He was 32 years older than her, and they became engaged to marry. When his two sisters discovered the betrothal, they were not pleased. He was a wealthy man and when he would die, his wealth would go to her. The sisters put him on a boat to Ireland. Addis sued for breach of promise, but left San Francisco before the trial. In 1888, some time after returning to America, Downey married Rosa V. Kelly, of Los Angeles, who died in 1892.

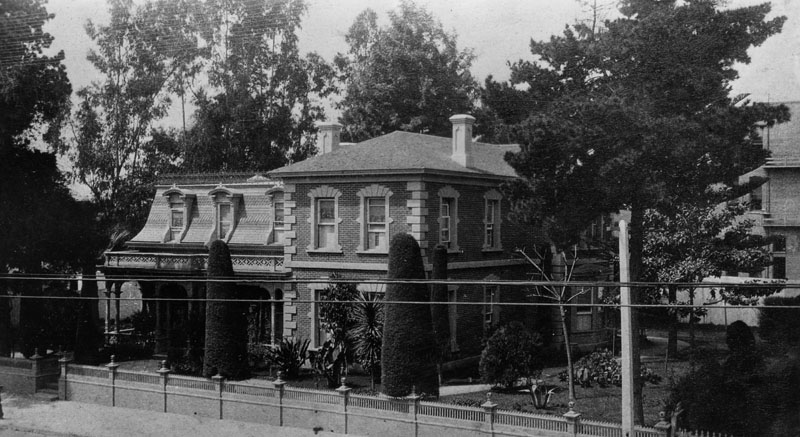
Downey's Los Angeles home, 1888.

In 1880, Downey had acquired the nearly 45,000-acre (18,000 ha) Warner's Ranch in San Diego County, which was being used for cattle ranching. In 1892 he moved to evict Cupeño American Indians who occupied some of the land as their traditional historic territory, especially near the hot springs (Agua Caliente.) The Cupeño challenged the eviction in a case that reached the U.S. Supreme Court, but by the time it was decided in 1901, he had died. While the court ruled the Cupeño did have a right to land, it said they had waited too long to press their case, according to a law about the issue when California entered the Union. In 1903 they were relocated to the Pala Indian Reservation about 75 miles (121 km) away.

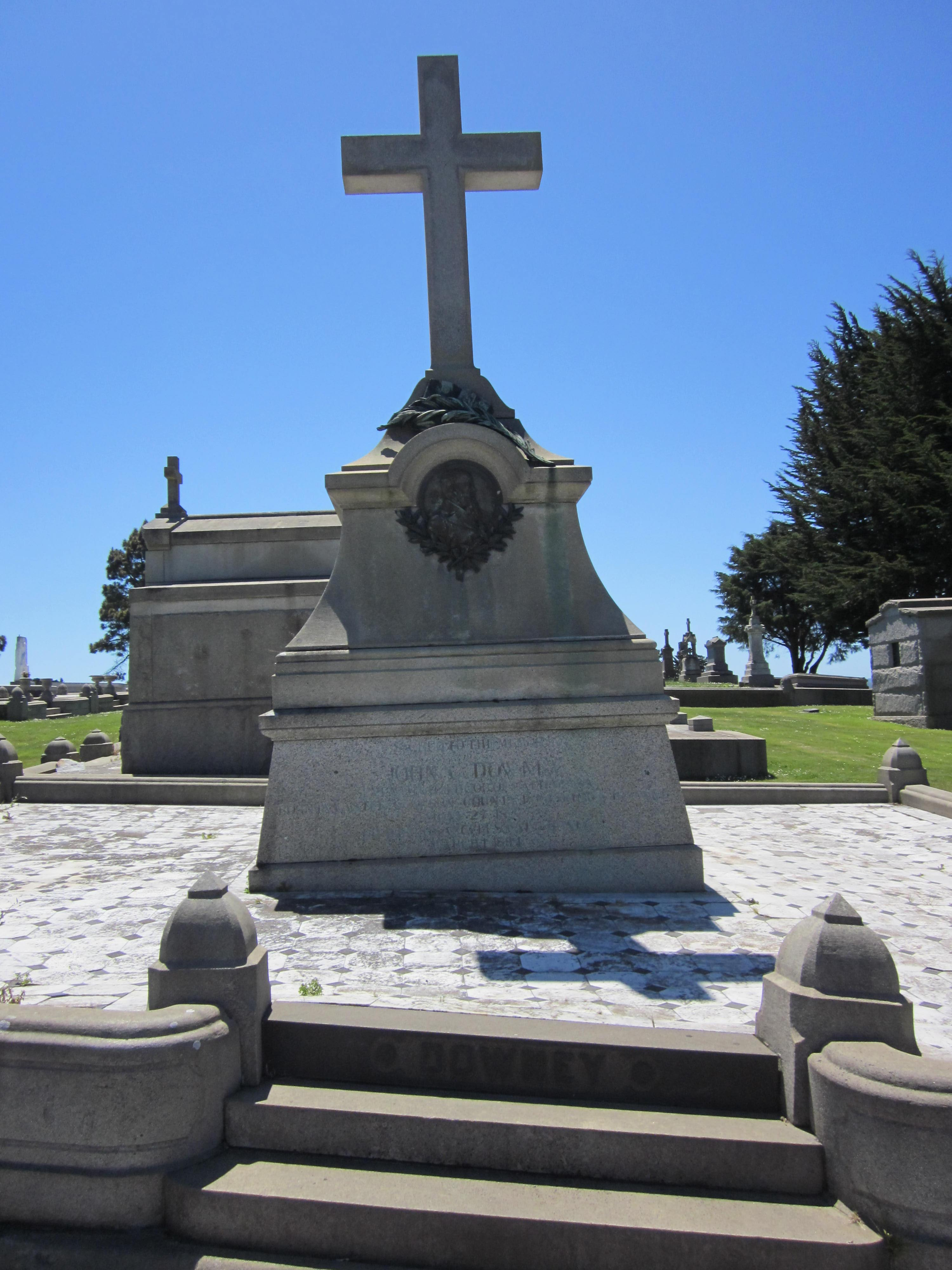
Downey's grave at Holy Cross

Downey died in 1894 at his home in Los Angeles. He was originally interred at Old Calvary Cemetery in Los Angeles, next to his first wife. After the cemetery was removed, their remains were relocated by Downey's sisters to Holy Cross Cemetery in Colma.

== Legacy ==
Downey, California was named after Downey. His land company owned the land that was subdivided to create the town in the 1870s.

During Downey's governorship, construction began on the California State Capitol in Sacramento. Also, during his governorship, the Pony Express began service to San Francisco, and the Central Pacific Railroad was formed.

== See also ==
- List of United States governors born outside the United States

Party political offices
Preceded by John Conness	Democratic nominee for Governor of California; 1863	Succeeded by Frederick F. Low
Political offices
Preceded by Milton Latham	Governor of California; January 9, 1860 – January 14, 1860	Succeeded by Leland Stanford
Preceded by John Walkup	Lieutenant Governor of California; 1860	Succeeded by Isaac N. Quinn
