= Newton Booth =

American politician (1825–1892)

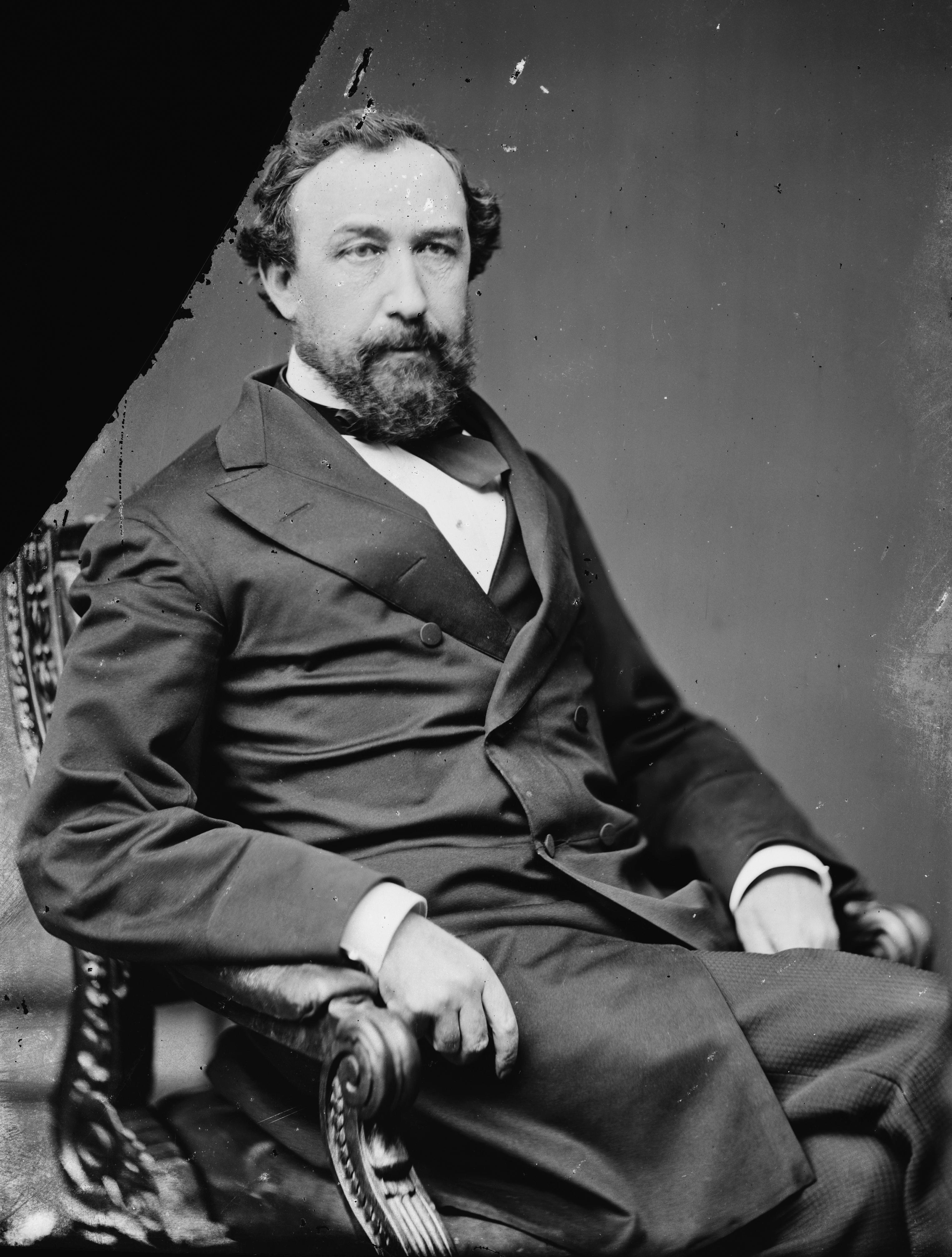
- Portrait by Brady c. 1870–1880

United States Senator from California
- In office March 4, 1875 – March 3, 1881
- Preceded by: John S. Hager
- Succeeded by: John F. Miller

11th Governor of California
- In office December 8, 1871 – February 27, 1875
- Lieutenant: Romualdo Pacheco
- Preceded by: Henry Huntly Haight
- Succeeded by: Romualdo Pacheco

Member of the California Senate from the 16th district
- In office December 7, 1863 – December 4, 1865
- Preceded by: William Watt
- Succeeded by: E. H. Heacock

Personal details
- Born: December 30, 1825 Salem, Indiana, U.S.
- Died: July 14, 1892 (aged 66) Sacramento, California, U.S.
- Party: Republican
- Other political affiliations: Democratic (before 1860); Anti-Monopoly (1874); Greenback (1876)
- Spouse: Octavine Glover (m. 1892)
- Education: DePauw University (B.A.)

Newton Booth (December 30, 1825 – July 14, 1892) was an American entrepreneur and politician who served as the 11th governor of California from 1871 to 1875 and as U.S. Senator from California from 1875 to 1881. He was the only member of the Anti-Monopoly Party elected to the U.S. Senate.

== Early life ==
Born to Hannah (née Pitts) of North Carolina and Beebe Booth of Connecticut, Quakers, in Salem, Indiana, he attended the common schools. In 1841, his parents Beebe and Hannah Booth moved from Salem to Terre Haute, Indiana. In 1846, he graduated from Asbury College (later renamed DePauw University), in nearby Greencastle, Indiana. Booth worked in his father's Terre Haute store, then studied law in the office of attorney William Dickson Griswold (1815–1896). He was admitted to the bar in 1849 and became a partner in Griswold's law firm.

== Business career ==
In 1850, Booth traveled to Panama, continuing by ship to San Francisco. Central Pacific Railroad founder, Lucius Anson Booth (1820–1906), a cousin and New York native, and Thomas Morton Lindley Sr. (1819–1896), in 1849, began the firm of Lindley & Booth. When Newton Booth arrived in Sacramento, the first cholera epidemic was spreading, and he went to Amador County, where he was sick for some time. The epidemic, reportedly, ended in three weeks. In May 1850, John Forshee, Lucius Anson Booth and John Dye established Forshee, Booth & Co. In the spring of 1851, Lucius Anson Booth and John Dye retired from Forshee, Booth & Co. In February, 1851, Charles Smith and Newton Booth established a business of Smith & Booth., on J Street, between 4th and 5th streets. Kleinhaus & Co., established in 1852, Theodore P. and David W. Kleinhaus as partners.

The firms suffered from the Sacramento Fire of November 2, 1852. Soon after Lucius Anson Booth, one of the organizers of Lindley & Booth, became a partner, and the firm assumed the name of Booth & Co. and continued until 1856, when Newton Booth retired and returned to Indiana, while the firm consolidated with Kleinhaus & Co., but the name was not changed from Booth & Co. In 1856, C. T. Wheeler and T. L. Barker were admitted as partners. The Kleinhauses retired in 1860, and Newton Booth again entered the firm. Lucius Anson Booth and T. L. Barker retired in 1862, and Joseph Terry Glover (1832–1886), of San Francisco, became a partner in the firm. In 1869, Lucius Anson Booth was working in San Francisco and living in Oakland. In December 1871, business was established in San Francisco in connection with W. W. Dodge. The firm in 1878 was composed of Newton Booth, C. T. Wheeler, Joseph Terry Glover and W. W. Dodge.

Newton Booth made his fortune as a saloon keeper.

He returned to Terre Haute in 1856 and engaged in the practice of law with future U.S. Congressman Harvey D. Scott. In the summer of 1857 Booth traveled through Europe.

== Political career ==
In 1860, Booth returned to Sacramento and the wholesale mercantile business. He campaigned for Abraham Lincoln for president. In 1862, he was elected to the California State Senate, serving from 1863 to 1865. In 1871, Booth was elected the eleventh governor of California, serving from December 8, 1871, to February 27, 1875. Booth openly sought black support.

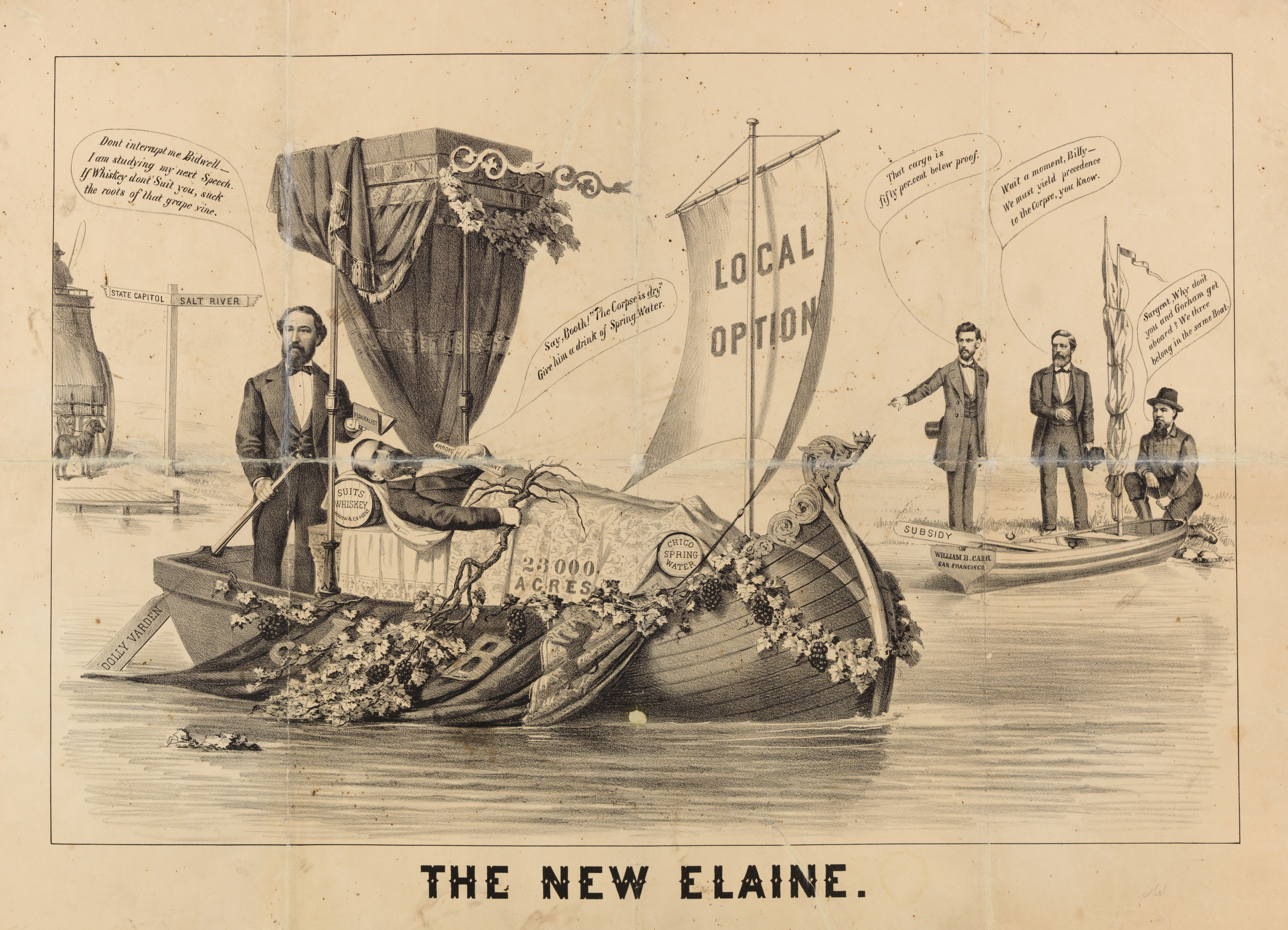
An early political caricature poster mocking California Republicans' support of a local option for alcohol, c. 1870s

In 1873, Booth helped to organize the Dolly Vardens, a new, independent, republican, anti-monopoly political party. The "Dolly Vardens" was named for a calico pattern composed of many different colors and figures, alluding to a political party made up of "sore heads from any party or by any name". With their support, he was elected to the U.S. Senate as a member of the Anti-Monopoly Party in December 1873, serving from March 4, 1875, to March 3, 1881. He was not a candidate for reelection in 1880. During his time in the Senate, he served as chairman of the U.S. Senate Committee on Manufacturers and the U.S. Senate Committee on Patents, both during the 45th Congress. In 1876, the Greenback Party nominated him for Vice President of the United States on the ticket with Peter Cooper. However, Booth declined the nomination and Samuel F. Cary replaced him. As of 2021, Booth remains the only senator from California who served as a member of a third party.

After serving in Congress, he returned to his wholesale mercantile business in Sacramento.

== Personal life ==
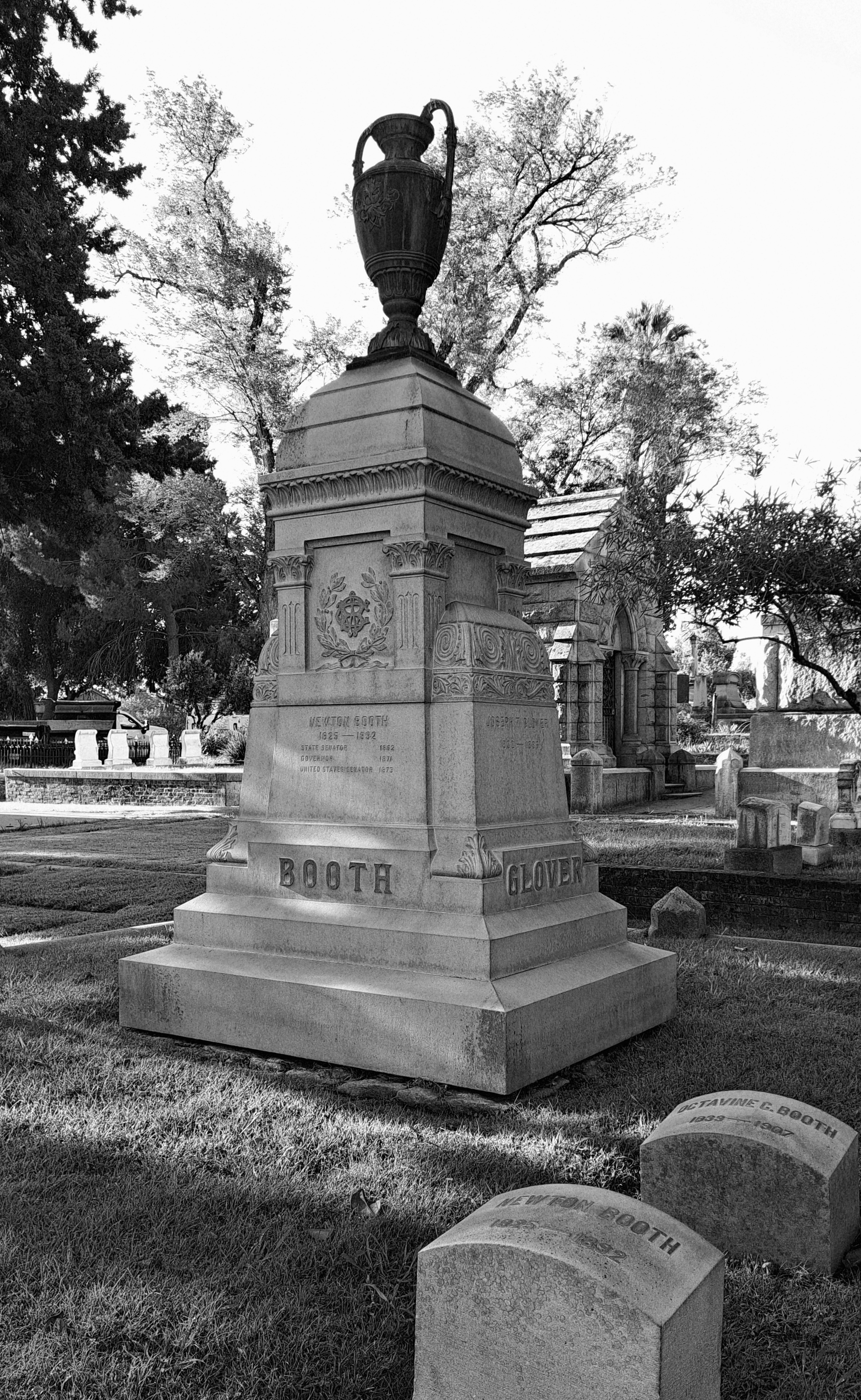
Booth gravesite

Booth married the widow of Joseph Terry Glover, his business partner, Octavine C. Glover (1833–1907) on 9 February 1892, in Sacramento, where he died, in July 1892. His wife, Octavine C. Booth (1833–1907), Glover's mother-in-law, Eliza Payne (1810–1873); his sister-in-law, Julia E. Dunn (1839–1923); and his brother-in-law, William Henry Payne (1848–1919) are interred in the Newton Booth plot in Sacramento Historic City Cemetery.

He was the uncle of author Booth Tarkington, son of his sister Elizabeth Booth, who was raised in Terre Haute.

== Recognition ==
- Sacramento's Newton Booth neighborhood was named for him.
- Native Sons of the Golden West historical plaque in front of the Booth Company wholesale grocery Building 1017 Front Street in Old Sacramento.

== Portrait gallery ==
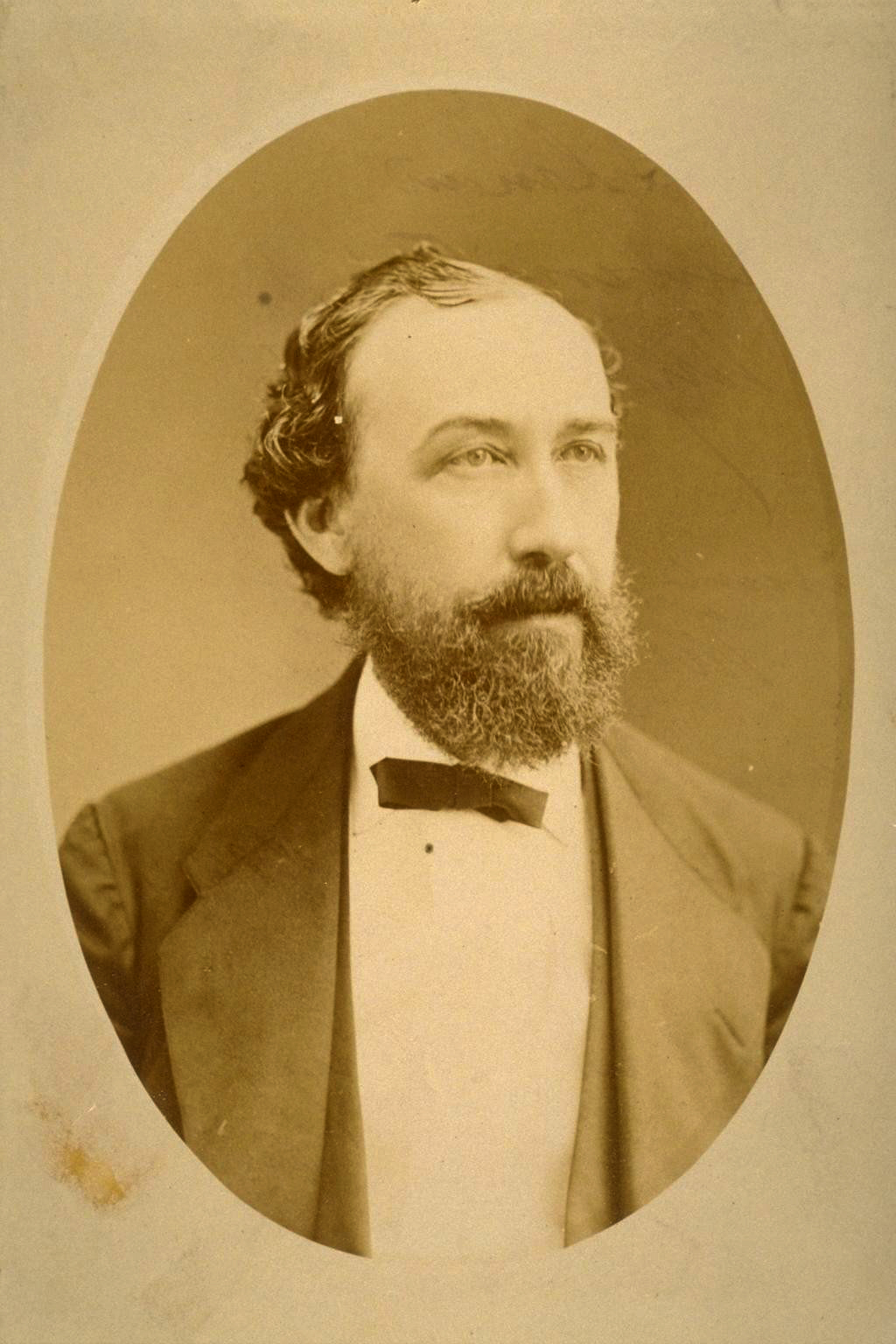
Booth in an undated portrait

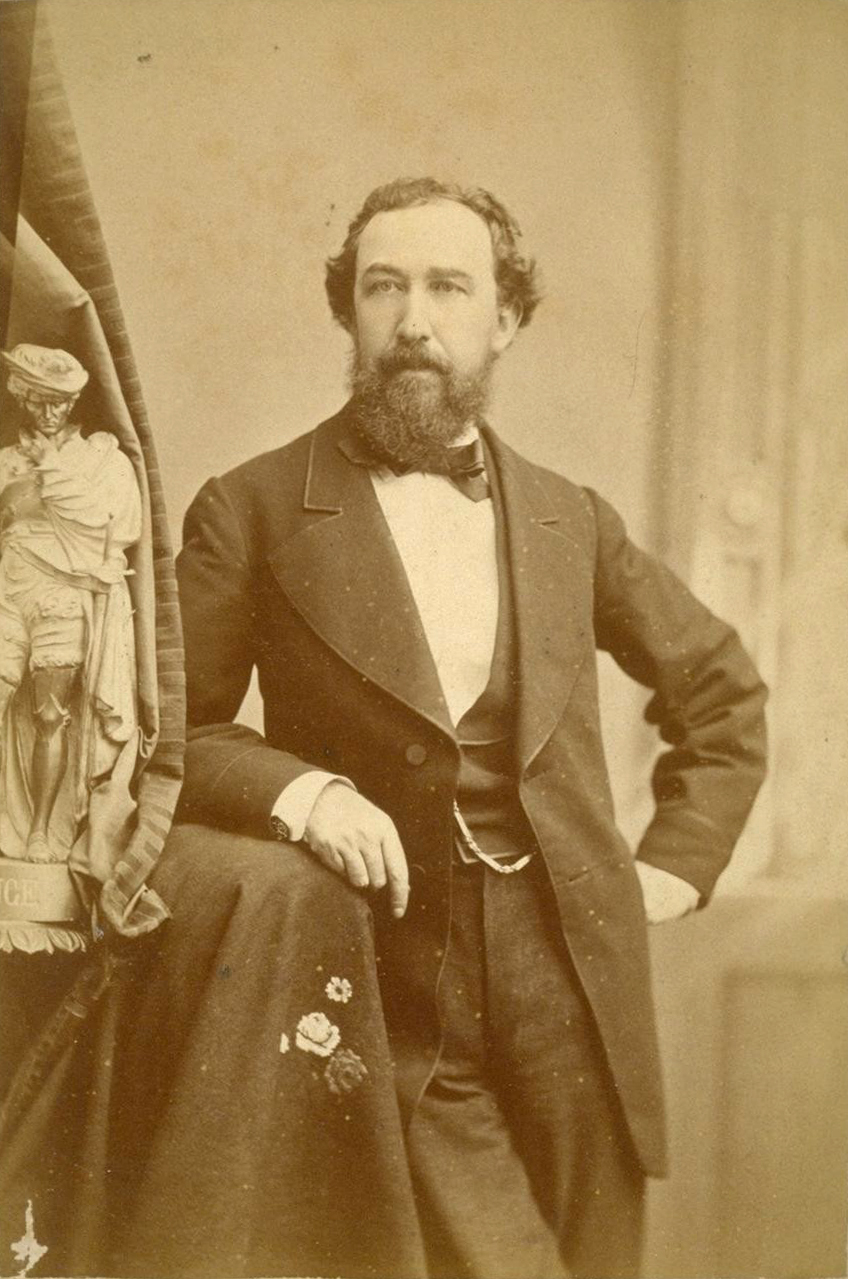
Booth in an undated portrait

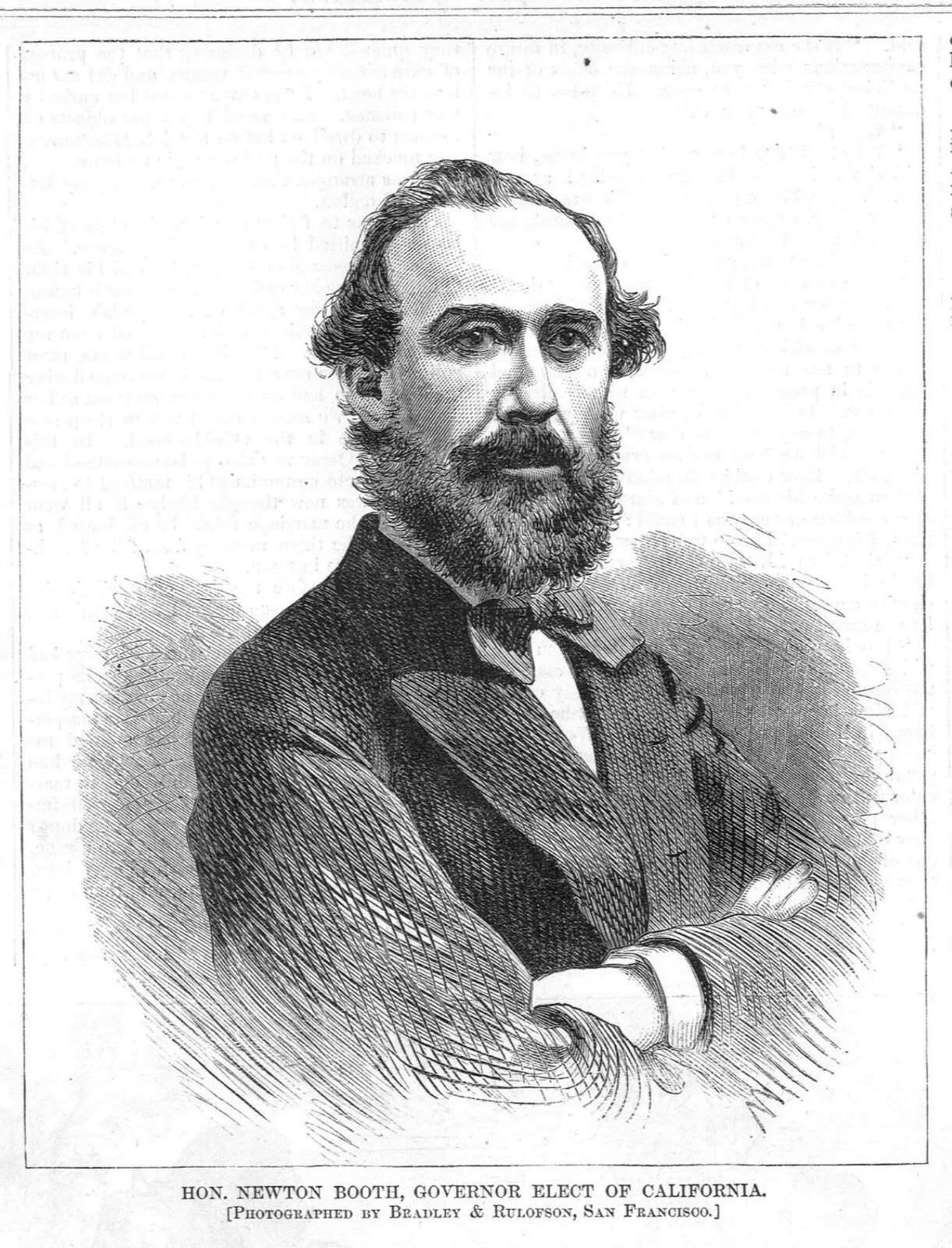
Engraving of Booth in Harper's Weekly, 1871

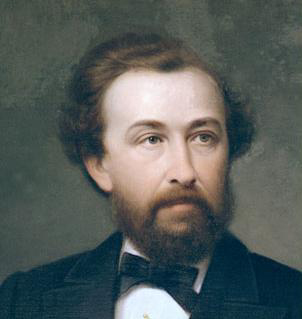
Booth's official gubernatorial portrait

== Caricature gallery ==
"Hayes Providing Gorham and Sargent With the Sinews of the Campaign for California"

"Look Upon This Picture and on This"

"The Reason why Senator Booth voted against the Hawaiian Sugar Treaty"

"Indiana's Verdict"

Party political offices
Preceded by George Congdon Gorham	Republican nominee for Governor of California; 1871	Succeeded by Timothy Guy Phelps
New political party	Greenback nominee for Vice President of the United States; Withdrew; 1876	Succeeded by Samuel F. Cary
Political offices
Preceded by Henry Huntly Haight	Governor of California; 1871–1875	Succeeded by Romualdo Pacheco
U.S. Senate
Preceded by John S. Hager	U.S. Senator (Class 1) from California; 1875–1881; Served alongside: Aaron Sargent, James T. Farley	Succeeded by John Miller
