= Frederick Low =

American politician

Frederick Ferdinand Low
- Portrait by Brady c. 1861–1863

United States Minister to China
- In office September 28, 1869 – July 24, 1873
- President: Ulysses S. Grant
- Preceded by: John Ross Browne
- Succeeded by: Benjamin Parke Avery

9th Governor of California
- In office December 10, 1863 – December 5, 1867
- Lieutenant: Tim N. Machin
- Preceded by: Leland Stanford
- Succeeded by: Henry Huntly Haight

Collector of the Port of San Francisco
- In office March 26, 1863 – August 11, 1863
- Appointed by: Abraham Lincoln
- Preceded by: Ira P. Rankin
- Succeeded by: Charles James

Member of the U.S. House of Representatives from California's at-large district
- In office June 3, 1862 – March 3, 1863
- Preceded by: Seat created
- Succeeded by: Thomas Bowles Shannon

Personal details
- Born: June 30, 1828 Frankfort, Maine, U.S.
- Died: July 21, 1894 (aged 66) San Francisco, California, U.S.
- Resting place: Cypress Lawn Memorial Park
- Party: Whig (before 1856); Republican (after 1856)
- Other political affiliations: National Union
- Spouse: Mollie Creed
- Children: Flora
- Profession: Banker, politician

Frederick Ferdinand Low (June 30, 1828 – July 21, 1894) was an American politician and diplomat who served as the 9th governor of California from 1863 to 1867. He was previously a member of the United States House of Representatives from 1862 to 1863, and was later appointed United States Minister to China, serving from 1869 to 1873.

== Early life and education ==
Low was born in Frankfort, Maine on June 30, 1828. He received a common school education and attended the Hampden Academy before moving to Boston in 1846 to clerk for a mercantile company. He came to California on the SS Panama in 1849, during the gold rush, working in the mines for three months and earning over $1,500 in gold. He then settled in San Francisco and became a merchant himself before the great fire of 1850 burned down his general store. He then relocated to Marysville and became a banker, as well as a co-founder of the California Steam Navigation Company.

== Career ==
Low later in life

Low presented credentials as a Republican representative-elect to the 37th Congress but was not permitted to take his seat until a special act of Congress was passed. He served as a member of the U.S. House of Representatives from June 3, 1862 to March 3, 1863.

Low was appointed collector of the Port of San Francisco by President Abraham Lincoln in 1863, and later that year was elected the 9th Governor of California, serving from December 10, 1863 to December 5, 1867. He was the second California governor to live in the Stanford Mansion as the official residence and office until the opening of the California State Capitol in 1869. Low was California's last Civil War governor. Hallmarks of his administration were the establishment of Yosemite National Park and University of California. Low was considered the father of the University of California, though his successor, Henry H. Haight, signed the Charter of the University.

Low served as United States Minister to China from 1869 to 1874. During his tenure, the Tianjin Massacre occurred, which Low reported back on to the United States.

== Personal life ==
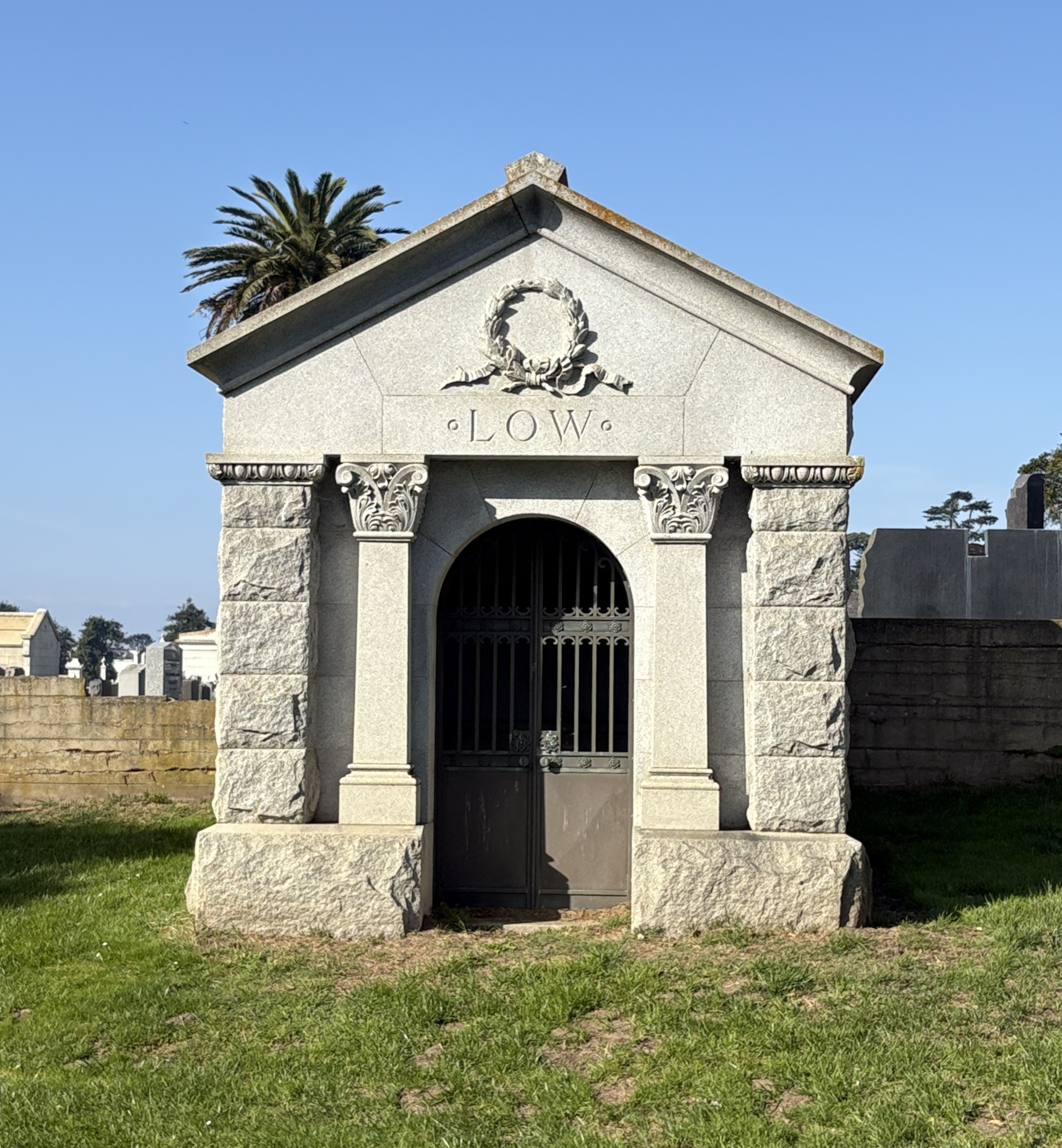
Low mausoleum at Cypress Lawn Memorial Park

He died in San Francisco on July 21, 1894. He is buried in the Cypress Lawn Memorial Park in Colma.

Party political offices
Preceded by Leland Stanford	Republican nominee for Governor of California; 1863	Succeeded by George Congdon Gorham
U.S. House of Representatives
Preceded by seat created	Member of the U.S. House of Representatives from California's at-large congressional district June 3, 1862–March 3, 1863	Succeeded by Thomas B. Shannon
Political offices
Preceded by Leland Stanford	Governor of California; December 10, 1863 – December 5, 1867	Succeeded by Henry H. Haight
