= List of burial places of governors of California =

This is a list of burial places of the governors of California.

== Burial places of the governors of California ==
No.	Governor	Date of death	Burial place	City	County	State	Site image
1	Peter H. Burnett	May 17, 1895	Santa Clara Mission Cemetery	Santa Clara	Santa Clara	California	
2	John McDougall	March 30, 1866	Cypress Lawn Memorial ParkCypress Lawn Memorial Park (Note: McDougall was originally buried at Laurel Hill Cemetery in San Francisco, and subsequently re-interred at Cypress Lawn Memorial Park.)	Colma	San Mateo	California	
3	John Bigler	November 29, 1871	Sacramento Historic City Cemetery	Sacramento	Sacramento	California	
4	J. Neely Johnson	August 31, 1872	Fort Douglas Cemetery	Salt Lake City	Salt Lake	Utah	
5	John B. Weller	August 17, 1875	St. John's Cemetery	New Orleans		Louisiana	
6	Milton Latham	March 4, 1882	Cypress Lawn Memorial ParkCypress Lawn Memorial Park (Note: Latham and his wife Sophie were originally buried at Laurel Hill Cemetery in San Francisco, and subsequently re-interred at Cypress Lawn Memorial Park in 1940.)	Colma	San Mateo	California	
7	John G. Downey	March 1, 1894	Holy Cross Cemetery	Colma	San Mateo	California	
8	Leland Stanford	June 21, 1893	Stanford Mausoleum	Palo Alto	Santa Clara	California	
9	Frederick Low	July 21, 1894	Cypress Lawn Memorial ParkCypress Lawn Memorial Park (Note: Low was originally buried at Laurel Hill Cemetery in San Francisco, and subsequently re-interred at Cypress Lawn Memorial Park.)	Colma	San Mateo	California	
10	Henry Huntly Haight	September 2, 1878	Mountain View Cemetery	Oakland	Alameda	California	
11	Newton Booth	July 14, 1892	Sacramento Historic City Cemetery	Sacramento	Sacramento	California	
12	Romualdo Pacheco	January 23, 1899	Mountain View Cemetery	Oakland	Alameda	California	
13	William Irwin	March 15, 1886	Sacramento Historic City Cemetery	Sacramento	Sacramento	California	
14	George C. Perkins	February 26, 1923	Mountain View Cemetery	Oakland	Alameda	California	
15	George Stoneman	September 5, 1894	Bentley Cemetery	Lakewood	Chautauqua	New York	
16	Washington Bartlett	September 12, 1887	Mountain View Cemetery	Oakland	Alameda	California	
17	Robert W. Waterman	April 12, 1891	Mt. Hope Cemetery	San Diego	San Diego	California	
18	Henry H. Markham	October 9, 1923	Mountain View Cemetery and Mausoleum	Altadena	Los Angeles	California	
19	James Budd	July 30, 1908	Stockton Rural Cemetery	Stockton	San Joaquin	California	
20	Henry Gage	August 28, 1924	New Calvary Cemetery	East Los Angeles	Los Angeles	California	
21	George Pardee	September 1, 1941	Mountain View Cemetery	Oakland	Alameda	California	
22	James Gillett	April 20, 1937	Chapel of Memories Columbarium	Oakland	Alameda	California	
23	Hiram Johnson	August 6, 1945	Cypress Lawn Memorial Park	Colma	San Mateo	California	
24	William Stephens	April 25, 1944	Angelus-Rosedale Cemetery	Los Angeles	Los Angeles	California	
25	Friend Richardson	September 6, 1943	Chapel of the Chimes	Oakland	Alameda	California	
26	C. C. Young	December 24, 1947	Sunset View Cemetery	El Cerrito	Contra Costa	California	
27	James Rolph	June 2, 1934	Greenlawn Memorial Park	Colma	San Mateo	California	
28	Frank Merriam	April 25, 1955	Forest Lawn Memorial Park	Long Beach	Los Angeles	California	
29	Culbert Olson	April 13, 1962	Forest Lawn Memorial Park	Glendale	Los Angeles	California	
30	Earl Warren	July 9, 1974	Arlington National Cemetery	Arlington		Virginia	
31	Goodwin Knight	May 22, 1970	Rose Hills Memorial Park	Whittier	Los Angeles	California	
32	Pat Brown	February 16, 1996	Holy Cross Cemetery	Colma	San Mateo	California	
33	Ronald Reagan	June 5, 2004	Ronald Reagan Presidential Library	Simi Valley	Ventura	California	
35	George Deukmejian	May 8, 2018	Unknown				

== See also ==
- List of governors of California
- List of burial places of presidents and vice presidents of the United States
