= 1902 California gubernatorial election =

- November 4, 1902
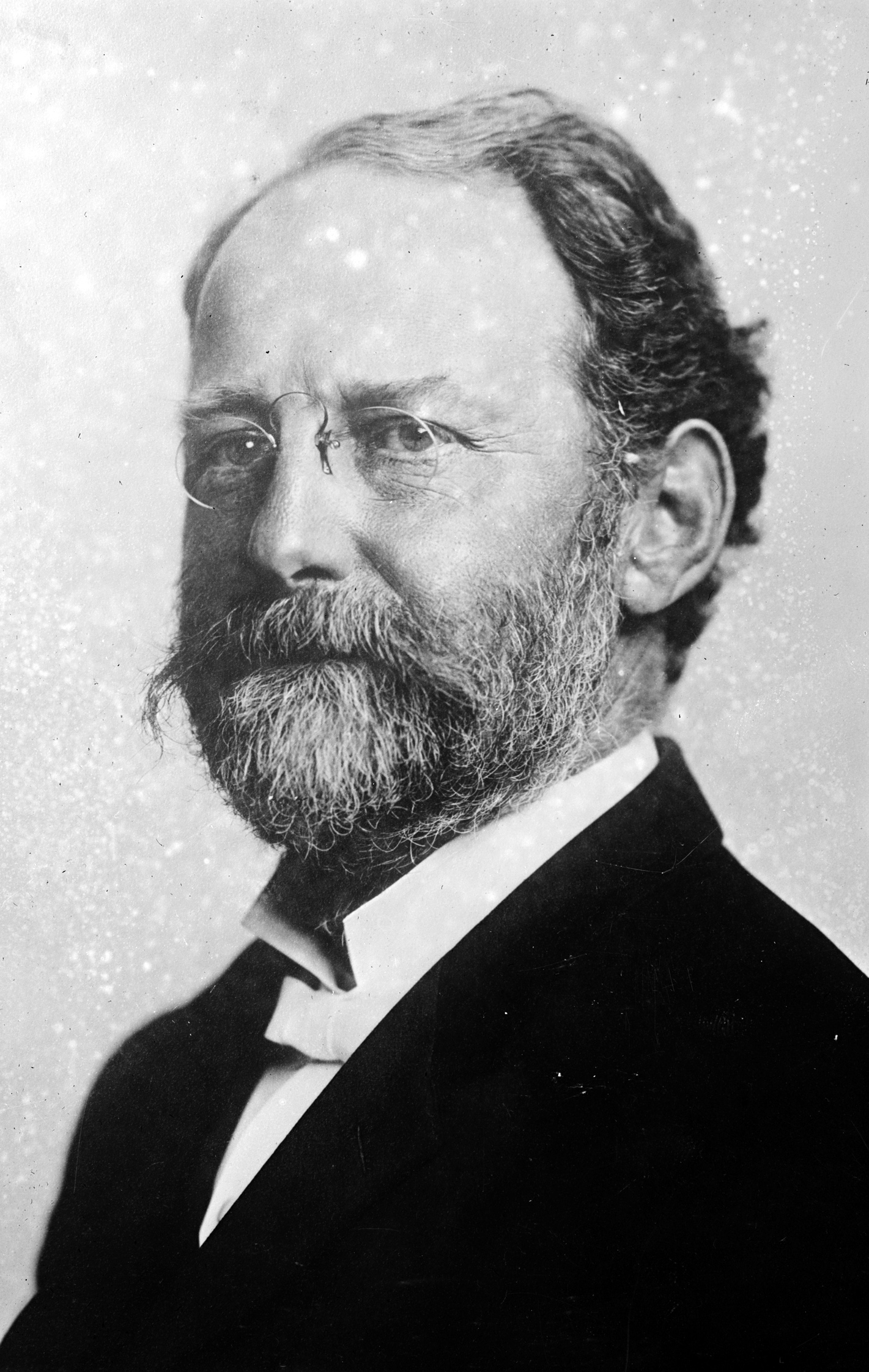

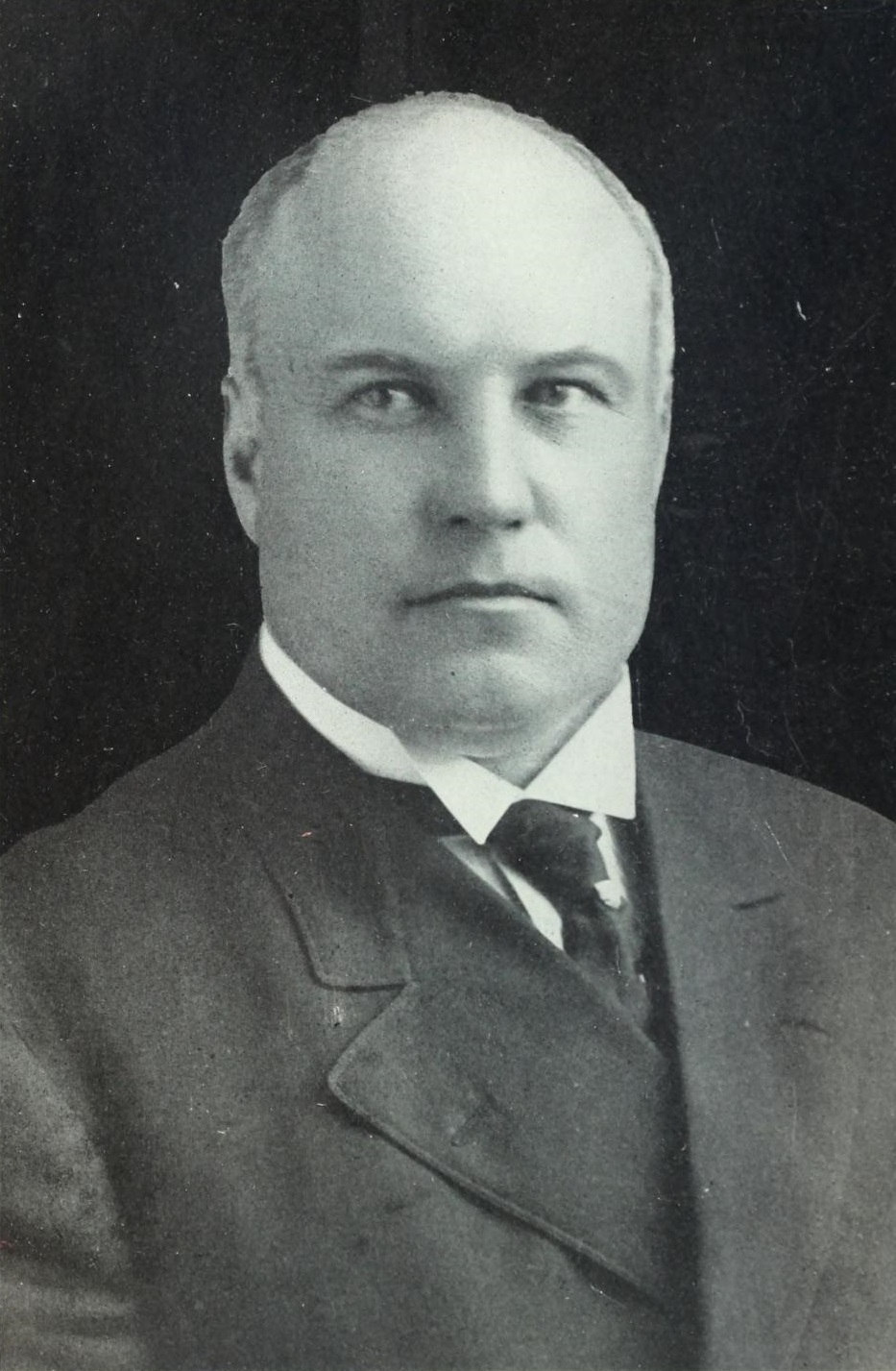
Nominee	George Pardee	Franklin Knight Lane
Party	Republican	Democratic
Popular vote	146,332	143,783
Percentage	48.06%	47.22%
- County results Pardee: 40–50% 50–60% 60–70% Lane: 40–50% 50–60% 60–70%
Governor before election
Henry Gage
Republican
Elected Governor
George Pardee
Republican

The 1902 California gubernatorial election was held on November 4, 1902, to elect the governor of California. George Pardee won the election with 48.06% percent of the popular vote and was the Governor of California until 1907. This was the first time since 1863 that the Republican Party retained control of the governorship in California.

== Republican primary campaign ==
At the beginning of the year 1902, Henry Gage the 20th governor was still favored to be re-elected, if not at least re-nominated. However, he and his administration were embroiled in a series of issues, the most prominent of which was the San Francisco plague of 1900–1904. His poor handling of the situation, alongside accusations of being a pawn of the Southern Pacific Railroad Company, led to a steep decline in his popularity. Despite this unpopularity, Gage still held a significant amount of power within the State Republican Party, and observers noted that he might force his way through to the Republican Party nomination.

George Pardee sent out word early in the election year that he would be running for the Republican nomination. He would later make his announcement official at a dinner in Oakland on January 27, 1902. At the time Pardee was working as a Regent of the University of California. In the beginning stages of the campaign, many observers doubted the seriousness of Pardee as a candidate, with some thinking that he was a stalking horse candidate, or that his infighting among those in the Republican Party would prove too costly in the primary.

The Republican State Convention would begin in San Jose on April 14, 1902. Governor Gage was still the favorite to win the nomination, despite his political scandals. He received several endorsements from Republican groups, and even received cheers from the crowd at the convention. However, as the convention continued, Gage received more negative press and more delegates were unclear as to whether they would support his renomination. While Gage lead in the initial ballots at the convention, he would steadily lose support, until the sixth and final ballot when George Pardee was nominated, with 515 votes.

== Democratic primary campaign ==
At the beginning of the year, the favorites for the Democratic nomination were Barney Murphy, Washington Dodge, and Franklin K. Lane. Franklin Knight Lane was the San Francisco City Attorney at the time of his campaign announcement. Despite not being favored to win the nomination at first, Lane would become the favorite to win by August 1902. On September 3, 1902, Lane was officially nominated by the Democratic Party, doing so on the first ballot. At the convention the Democratic Party would develop a progressive platform, which included low tariffs, the direct election of U.S. Senators, and support for the use of referendum, recall, and initiatives on the ballot in California. The party also supported the exclusion of Chinese immigration, as well as the establishment of a mine bureau, and labor bureau.

== Third party campaigns ==
In September 1902, the Socialist Campaign Committee of California nominated Gideon S. Brower for Governor of California. Brower was born in New York in 1849. He moved to California in 1886 and began working as a carpenter in Fresno. He joined Carpenters Union, Local 701 and became a member of the Socialist Party shortly after.

On August 28, 1902, the Prohibition Party nominated Theodore D. Kanouse as their candidate for governor. Kanouse was a former Civil War veteran, who served as a musician in the 6th Wisconsin Infantry Regiment and in the 3rd Wisconsin Light Artillery Regiment. After the war he retired to California, where he was active in the temperance movement.

In September 1902, the United Labor Party nominated Carl Browne, a former leader in the Workingmen's Party of California and Coxey's Army, for governor. The following month, secretary of state Charles F. Curry denied Browne and his party a place on the November ballot on the grounds that their name was too similar to the preexisting Union Labor Party (who supported Lane) and that the signatures the party collected were invalid.

== General election campaigns ==
After both parties selected their nominees, newspapers around the State of California stated that Pardee was likely to win. The Santa Cruz Sentinel stated,"Pardee's majority over Lane will be nearer 40,000 than 20,000. This is a Republican year on the Pacific Coast." George Pardee opened his general election campaign with a speech in Oakland, where he stated,

I am glad whenever labor adds another cent to its daily wages, and I rejoice when the laboring man is able to cut off another hour from the time that he spends at his daily toil. I am glad and I rejoice over these things because I know that the more wages the laboring man gets the better citizen he will be, the more able he will be to send his children to school and to our university, and to make of them our future great men. For it is a fact that our greatest men have sprung from the common people. And I rejoice when the hours of labor are shortened because I know that with shorter hours the workingman will have more time to give to his wife and his children. And I know, from my own experience, that the more time a man can give to his wife and children the better man he is. And I believe that shorter hours and higher, wages will give us better citizens and make us all more prosperous. And I am convinced that there is but one way for the working people to gain their ends, and that is by a wise, intelligent and firm organization. There never was a better exemplification of the motto "United we stand, divided we fall" than in the case of the working people.

For this speech, Pardee was praised by standing ovation from a supportive crowd. Franklin K. Lane opened his general election campaign on September 22, 1902, in the city of San Diego. It was there that he addressed a large crowd and stated

I am extremely pleased that I came here to open my campaign. I am pleased that I decided to begin at the bottom and work up as I have done in many other things. I am glad that I have done this because I have gained a larger conception of the state as I came down through the mountains and the valley and broke through the foothills at last onto the inimitable surf line which lands us here. My ideas have grown and I have expanded on the trip and have a larger idea of the state which I would serve. It is a wonderful state, with her high mountains, deep valleys and remarkable scenery, and I feel tonight that I would be a governor for the whole state and not for any section of it. My eye is not fixed on San Francisco as some have said, but I have my eye looking as from Eagle Peak at the Yosemite, looking broadly over the whole state. I would not be a man of the narrow kind. I would not be a governor of the narrow kind.

Both candidates pledged to campaign "cleanly", with no mudslinging to occur between the two campaigns. Lane and Pardee would cross the state, speaking in major cities and looking for support and endorsements from newspapers, civic groups, and labor unions across California. Towards the end of the campaign, and near the date of the general election, many papers believed that the election of George Pardee was likely if not inevitable.

== Results ==
California gubernatorial election, 1902
Party	Candidate	Votes	%	±%
Republican	George Pardee	146,332	48.06%	−3.62%
Democratic	Franklin Knight Lane	143,783	47.22%	+2.19%
Socialist	Gideon S. Brower	9,592	3.15%	+3.15%
Prohibition	Theodore D. Kanouse	4,636	1.52%	+0.03%
	Scattering	130	0.04%	
Majority		2,549	0.84%	
Total votes		304,473	100.00%	
Republican hold		Swing	-5.81%	

=== Results by county ===
County	George C. Pardee Republican		Franklin K. Lane Democratic		Gideon S. Brower Socialist		Theodore D. Kanouse Prohibition		Scattering Write-in		Margin		Total votes cast
County	#	%	#	%	#	%	#	%	#	%	#	%	Total votes cast
Alameda	13,915	57.54%	9,022	37.31%	1,009	4.17%	238	0.98%	0	0.00%	4,893	20.23%	24,184
Alpine	87	61.70%	52	36.88%	1	0.71%	1	0.71%	0	0.00%	35	24.82%	141
Amador	1,376	50.98%	1,290	47.80%	16	0.59%	17	0.63%	0	0.00%	86	3.19%	2,699
Butte	2,271	49.64%	2,171	47.45%	57	1.25%	76	1.66%	0	0.00%	100	2.19%	4,575
Calaveras	1,726	53.47%	1,456	45.11%	35	1.08%	10	0.31%	1	0.03%	270	8.36%	3,228
Colusa	606	33.74%	1,158	64.48%	23	1.28%	9	0.50%	0	0.00%	-552	-30.73%	1,796
Contra Costa	2,122	49.82%	1,950	45.79%	155	3.64%	31	0.73%	1	0.02%	172	4.04%	4,259
Del Norte	368	50.97%	305	42.24%	43	5.96%	6	0.83%	0	0.00%	63	8.73%	722
El Dorado	1,160	45.53%	1,320	51.81%	49	1.92%	19	0.75%	0	0.00%	-160	-6.28%	2,548
Fresno	3,677	44.17%	4,080	49.01%	371	4.46%	196	2.35%	1	0.01%	-403	-4.84%	8,325
Glenn	540	37.60%	880	61.28%	11	0.77%	5	0.35%	0	0.00%	-340	-23.68%	1,436
Humboldt	3,447	57.54%	2,316	38.66%	135	2.25%	87	1.45%	6	0.10%	1,131	18.88%	5,991
Inyo	435	47.80%	427	46.92%	25	2.75%	23	2.53%	0	0.00%	8	0.88%	910
Kern	1,748	39.92%	2,539	57.98%	66	1.51%	23	0.53%	3	0.07%	-791	-18.06%	4,379
Kings	956	46.98%	999	49.09%	51	2.51%	28	1.38%	1	0.05%	-43	-2.11%	2,035
Lake	636	43.83%	747	51.48%	32	2.21%	34	2.34%	2	0.14%	-11	-7.65%	1,451
Lassen	540	53.62%	434	43.10%	29	2.88%	4	0.40%	0	0.00%	106	10.53%	1,007
Los Angeles	17,471	56.07%	11,121	35.69%	1,140	3.66%	1,402	4.50%	26	0.08%	6,350	20.38%	31,160
Madera	737	42.63%	929	53.73%	46	2.66%	16	0.93%	1	0.06%	-192	-11.10%	1,729
Marin	1,646	57.47%	1,168	40.78%	44	1.54%	6	0.21%	0	0.00%	478	16.69%	2,864
Mariposa	526	38.23%	828	60.17%	15	1.09%	7	0.51%	0	0.00%	-302	-21.95%	1,376
Mendocino	2,129	46.67%	2,340	51.29%	44	0.96%	49	1.07%	0	0.00%	-211	-4.63%	4,562
Merced	742	37.16%	1,179	59.04%	55	2.75%	21	1.05%	0	0.00%	-437	-21.88%	1,997
Modoc	478	43.77%	592	54.21%	12	1.10%	10	0.92%	0	0.00%	-114	-10.44%	1,092
Mono	292	50.43%	278	48.01%	7	1.21%	2	0.35%	0	0.00%	14	2.42%	579
Monterey	1,924	48.03%	1,957	48.85%	36	0.90%	89	2.22%	0	0.00%	-33	-0.82%	4,006
Napa	1,941	54.08%	1,563	43.55%	45	1.25%	38	1.06%	2	0.06%	378	10.53%	3,589
Nevada	2,000	48.65%	1,901	46.24%	142	3.45%	68	1.65%	0	0.00%	99	2.41%	4,111
Orange	2,338	54.41%	1,536	35.75%	194	4.51%	229	5.33%	0	0.00%	802	18.66%	4,297
Placer	1,800	49.09%	1,722	46.96%	104	2.84%	41	1.12%	0	0.00%	78	2.13%	3,667
Plumas	669	56.89%	498	42.35%	1	0.09%	7	0.60%	1	0.09%	171	14.54%	1,176
Riverside	2,216	63.44%	807	23.10%	314	8.99%	156	4.47%	0	0.00%	1,409	40.34%	3,493
Sacramento	4,661	45.66%	5,154	50.49%	310	3.04%	81	0.79%	1	0.01%	-493	-4.83%	10,207
San Benito	680	40.84%	945	56.76%	12	0.72%	28	1.68%	0	0.00%	-265	-15.92%	1,665
San Bernardino	3,103	55.76%	1,932	34.72%	291	5.23%	237	4.26%	2	0.04%	1,171	21.04%	5,565
San Diego	3,182	49.26%	2,517	38.97%	657	10.17%	97	1.50%	6	0.09%	665	10.30%	6,459
San Francisco	24,106	40.13%	33,743	56.18%	1,993	3.32%	164	0.27%	61	0.10%	-9,637	-16.04%	60,067
San Joaquin	3,413	48.14%	3,488	49.20%	120	1.69%	68	0.96%	1	0.01%	-75	-1.06%	7,090
San Luis Obispo	1,628	43.56%	1,972	52.77%	53	1.42%	84	2.25%	0	0.00%	-344	-9.21%	3,737
San Mateo	1,426	50.25%	1,383	48.73%	28	0.99%	1	0.04%	0	0.00%	43	1.52%	2,838
Santa Barbara	2,150	52.43%	1,722	41.99%	178	4.34%	51	1.24%	0	0.00%	428	10.44%	4,101
Santa Clara	6,078	49.40%	5,745	46.70%	209	1.70%	265	2.15%	6	0.05%	333	2.71%	12,303
Santa Cruz	1,819	44.84%	2,009	49.52%	127	3.13%	101	2.49%	1	0.02%	-190	-4.68%	4,057
Shasta	1,741	41.53%	2,291	54.65%	120	2.86%	40	0.95%	0	0.00%	-550	-13.12%	4,192
Sierra	708	58.03%	506	41.48%	5	0.41%	1	0.08%	0	0.00%	202	16.56%	1,220
Siskiyou	1,643	44.20%	1,998	53.75%	56	1.51%	19	0.51%	1	0.03%	-355	-9.55%	3,717
Solano	2,366	45.83%	2,411	46.70%	310	6.00%	76	1.47%	0	0.00%	-45	-0.87%	5,163
Sonoma	4,192	48.95%	4,097	47.84%	182	2.13%	89	1.04%	4	0.05%	95	1.11%	8,564
Stanislaus	1,069	40.96%	1,458	55.86%	39	1.49%	44	1.69%	0	0.00%	-389	-14.90%	2,610
Sutter	815	52.61%	704	45.45%	15	0.97%	15	0.97%	0	0.00%	111	7.17%	1,549
Tehama	1,138	45.98%	1,255	50.71%	45	1.82%	37	1.49%	0	0.00%	-117	-4.73%	2,475
Trinity	565	45.38%	662	53.17%	16	1.29%	2	0.16%	0	0.00%	-97	-7.79%	1,245
Tulare	1,683	38.56%	2,397	54.91%	223	5.11%	62	1.42%	0	0.00%	-714	-16.36%	4,365
Tuolumne	1,227	40.44%	1,682	55.44%	94	3.10%	31	1.02%	0	0.00%	-455	15.00%	3,034
Ventura	1,844	54.01%	1,405	41.15%	115	3.37%	49	1.44%	1	0.03%	439	12.86%	3,414
Yolo	1,447	44.41%	1,695	52.03%	75	2.30%	40	1.23%	1	0.03%	-248	-7.61%	3,258
Yuba	1,129	51.46%	1,047	47.72%	12	0.55%	6	0.27%	0	0.00%	82	3.74%	2,194
Total	146,332	48.06%	143,783	47.22%	9,592	3.15%	4,636	1.52%	130	0.04%	2,549	0.84%	304,473

==== Counties that flipped from Democratic to Republican ====
- Inyo

==== Counties that flipped from Republican to Democratic ====
- Kings
- Sacramento
- San Francisco
- San Joaquin
- Santa Cruz
- Siskiyou
- Solano
- Trinity
- Yolo
