= List of governors of California by education =

Below is a list of governors of California by education. Most California governors received a college education, especially since 1895. Of the nineteenth century governors, half attended college. College degrees have set governors apart from the general population, and governors of California have often held such a degree even when this was extremely rare and, indeed, unnecessary for practicing most occupations, including law. Every California governor since 1923 has had a degree, with the most degrees being attained from UC Berkeley.

== List of governors of California by education ==
Governor	Schools	Degrees
Peter Burnett	None	None
John McDougall	None	None
John Bigler	Dickinson College	Dropped out
J. Neely Johnson	None	None
John B. Weller	Miami University	
Milton Latham	Washington & Jefferson College	1845
John G. Downey	None	None
Leland Stanford	Cazenovia College	LL.B. 1845
Frederick Low	None	None
H.H. Haight	Yale University	A.B. 1844
Newton Booth	De Pauw University	A.B. 1846
Romualdo Pacheco	None	None
William Irwin	Marietta College	1848
George Perkins	None	None
George Stoneman	United States Military Academy	1846
Washington Bartlett	None	None
Robert Waterman	None	None
Henry Markham	None	None
James Budd	University of California, Berkeley	A.B. 1873
Henry Gage	None	None
George Pardee	University of California, Berkeley	Ph.B. 1879
George Pardee	University of California, Berkeley	A.M. 1882
George Pardee	University of Leipzig	M.D. 1885
James Gillett	None	None
Hiram Johnson	University of California, Berkeley	Dropped out 1887
William Stephens	None	None
Friend Richardson	San Bernardino College	
C. C. Young	University of California, Berkeley	B.L. 1892
James Rolph	None	None
Frank Merriam	Lenox College	B.S. 1887
Culbert Olson	Brigham Young University	B.A. in Law and Journalism, 1890
Culbert Olson	University of Michigan Law School	Transferred to GWU Law
Culbert Olson	George Washington University Law School	LL.B. 1901
Earl Warren	University of California, Berkeley	B.A. 1912
Earl Warren	University of California, Berkeley School of Law	LL.B. 1914
Goodwin Knight	Stanford University	A.B. in Law and Business, 1919
Goodwin Knight	Cornell University	Graduate work, 1920
Pat Brown	San Francisco Law School	LL.B. 1927
Ronald Reagan	Eureka College	B.A. in Economics, 1932
Jerry Brown	University of California, Berkeley	B.A. in Classics, 1961
Jerry Brown	Yale Law School	J.D. 1964
George Deukmejian	Siena College	B.A. in Sociology, 1949
George Deukmejian	St. John's University School of Law	J.D. 1952
Pete Wilson	Yale University	B.A. in English, 1956
Pete Wilson	University of California, Berkeley School of Law	J.D. 1962
Gray Davis	Stanford University	A.B. in History, 1964
Gray Davis	Columbia Law School	J.D. 1967
Arnold Schwarzenegger	University of Wisconsin–Superior	B.A. in Business and International Economics, 1979
Jerry Brown	University of California, Berkeley	B.A. in Classics, 1961
Jerry Brown	Yale Law School	J.D. 1964
Gavin Newsom	Santa Clara University	B.A. in Political Science, 1989

== List by institutions ==
School	Governor(s)	Degree(s)
University of California, Berkeley & UC Berkeley Law School	James Budd	A.B. 1873
University of California, Berkeley & UC Berkeley Law School	George Pardee	Ph.B. 1879
University of California, Berkeley & UC Berkeley Law School	George Pardee	A.M. 1882
University of California, Berkeley & UC Berkeley Law School	Hiram Johnson	Dropped out 1887
University of California, Berkeley & UC Berkeley Law School	C. C. Young	B.L. 1892
University of California, Berkeley & UC Berkeley Law School	Earl Warren	B.A. 1912
University of California, Berkeley & UC Berkeley Law School	Earl Warren	LL.B. 1914
University of California, Berkeley & UC Berkeley Law School	Jerry Brown	B.A. in Classics, 1961
University of California, Berkeley & UC Berkeley Law School	Pete Wilson	J.D. 1962
Yale University & Yale Law School	H.H. Haight	A.B. 1844
Yale University & Yale Law School	Jerry Brown	J.D. 1964
Yale University & Yale Law School	Pete Wilson	B.A. in English, 1956
Stanford University	Goodwin Knight	A.B. in Law and Business, 1919
Stanford University	Gray Davis	A.B. in History, 1964
Brigham Young University	Culbert Olson	B.A. in Law and Journalism, 1890
Cazenovia College	Leland Stanford	LL.B. 1845
Columbia Law School	Gray Davis	J.D. 1967
Cornell University	Goodwin Knight	Graduate work, 1920
De Pauw University	Newton Booth	A.B. 1846
Dickinson College	John Bigler	Dropped out
Eureka College	Ronald Reagan	B.A. in Economics, 1932
George Washington University Law School	Culbert Olson	LL.B. 1901
University of Leipzig	George Pardee	M.D. 1885
Lenox College	Frank Merriam	B.S. 1887
Marietta College	William Irwin	1848
Miami University	John B. Weller	
University of Michigan Law School	Culbert Olson	Transferred to GWU Law
St. John's University School of Law	George Deukmejian	J.D. 1952
San Bernardino College	Friend Richardson	
San Francisco Law School	Pat Brown	LL.B. 1927
Santa Clara University	Gavin Newsom	B.A. 1989
Siena College	George Deukmejian	B.A. in Sociology, 1949
United States Military Academy	George Stoneman	1846
Washington & Jefferson College	Milton Latham	1845
University of Wisconsin–Superior	Arnold Schwarzenegger	B.A. in Business and International Economics, 1979
None	Peter Burnett	None
None	John McDougall	None
None	J. Neely Johnson	None
None	John G. Downey	None
None	Frederick Low	None
None	Romualdo Pacheco	None
None	George Perkins	None
None	Washington Bartlett	None
None	Robert Waterman	None
None	Henry Markham	None
None	Henry Gage	None
None	James Gillett	None
None	William Stephens	None
None	James Rolph	None
