= Wahaka =

Wahaka may refer to:

- The phonetic pronunciation of the state of Oaxaca in Mexico
- The name of a brand of an artisanal mezcal produced by Zapotec family in San Dionisio, Oaxaca
- Wahaka, the name of the rock also known as the "Three Brothers (Yosemite)", in Yosemite Valley, Mariposa County, California
- Wahaka, a former Awami village at the base of the rock known as the "Three Brothers", in Yosemite Valley, Mariposa County, California
- USS Wahaka (YTB-526), later YTM-526, a United States Navy tug placed in commission in 1947

== See also ==
- Oaxaca—a homonym
