= Pierce H. Ryan =

American politician (1829–1889)

Member of the California Senate from the 27th district
- In office January 5, 1880 – January 5, 1885
- Preceded by: Robert McGarvey
- Succeeded by: Belden G. Hurlburt

Personal details
- Born: November 3, 1829 County Tipperary, Ireland
- Died: November 7, 1889 (aged 60) Eureka, California, U.S.
- Party: Democratic (before 1879, after 1881); Workingmen's (1879–1881)
- Spouse: Annie B. Rice
- Children: 6
- Occupation: Merchant, military officer, politician

Military service
- Allegiance: United States
- Branch/service: California National Guard
- Years of service: 1876–1886
- Rank: Major
- Unit: 6th Brigade, Eureka Guard

Pierce Howard Ryan (November 3, 1829 – November 7, 1889) was an Irish American merchant, military officer and politician who served in the California State Senate from 1880 to 1885. Elected as a member of the Workingmen's Party of California, he entered politics as a Douglas Democrat and rejoined the party following the WPC's collapse.

Ryan was previously appointed Humboldt Harbor Commissioner in 1870, engrossing clerk of the State Senate in 1875, and notary public for Humboldt County in 1877. He also served as a major in the California National Guard from 1876 to 1886. He belonged to the same unit as future governor James Gillett, and the two men were active together in Eureka's anti-Chinese movement.

In 1886, Ryan was nominated for register of the Eureka Land Office by president Grover Cleveland. Less than a month later, the nomination was withdrawn due to the opposition of senator George Hearst and representative Barclay Henley; Ryan's previous defection to the WPC had made him a controversial figure in the Democratic Party.

== Sources ==
- Irvine, Leigh H. (1915). History of Humboldt County, California. Los Angeles: Historic Record Company. pp. 280–281.
