= Enoch H. Pardee =

American politician

Enoch Homer Pardee
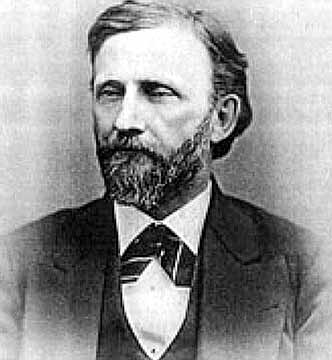

18th Mayor of Oakland
- In office 1876–1878
- Preceded by: Mark Weber
- Succeeded by: Washburne R. Andrus

Personal details
- Born: 1829 Greece, New York, U.S.
- Died: 1896 (aged 66–67)

Enoch Homer Pardee (1829–1896) was an American medical doctor and politician. He served as the 18th Mayor of Oakland, California, from 1876 to 1878.

== Biography ==
Pardee c. 1892

Born in Greece, New York, on April 1, 1829, Pardee settled in the Midwest before immigrating to California during the Gold Rush in the late 1840s, when he panned gold in the Sierra Nevada. Following the end of the Gold Rush, Pardee settled in San Francisco, becoming a prominent oculist. Between 1868 and 1869, Pardee built his home in Oakland, known today as the Pardee Home. Outside of the medical profession, Pardee ventured into politics. He was elected as a Republican to the lower house California State Assembly between 1871 and 1873, representing the East Bay 9th District. In 1876, Pardee was elected to a single term as Mayor of Oakland.

Pardee died in his adopted city of Oakland in 1896. He is interred at Mountain View Cemetery in Oakland.

His only son, George C. Pardee, also became a respected medical doctor and politician like his father. He was elected as Oakland Mayor between 1893 and 1895, and later served a single term as Governor of California from 1903 to 1907.

Political offices
Preceded by Mark Weber	Mayor of Oakland, California; 1876—1878	Succeeded by Washburne R. Andrus
