= Pardee Home =

Historic house in California, United States

- Pardee House
- U.S. National Register of Historic Places
- California Historical Landmark
- Oakland Designated Landmark
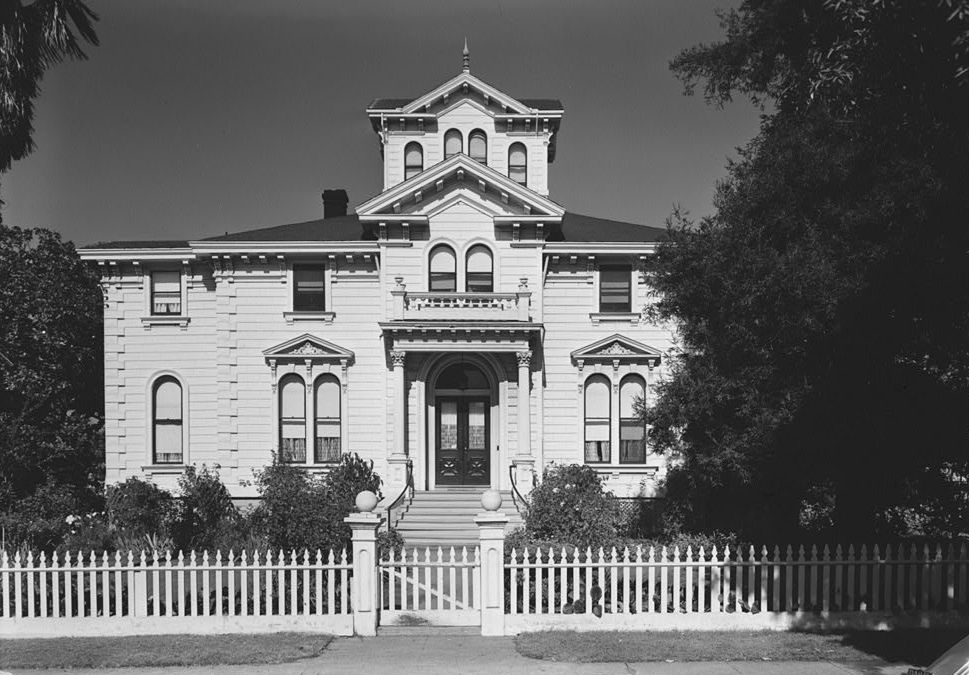
- The Pardee Home in 1960

- Location within Oakland, California Location within California Location within the United States
- Location: 672 11th Street; Oakland, CA, U.S.
- Coordinates: 37°48′17.1″N 122°16′40.4″W
- Built: 1868
- Architectural style: Italianate
- NRHP reference No.: 76000476
- CHISL No.: 1027
- ODL No.: 7

Significant dates
- Added to NRHP: May 24, 1976
- Designated CHISL: 1998

The Pardee Home is a house in Oakland, California. It was the home of three generations of the Pardee family. It is now a non-profit museum showing over 100 years of the life of a prominent California family. The house, a well-preserved example of Italianate architecture, is a city landmark, a California Historical Landmark, and listed on the National Register of Historic Places.

The house was constructed in 1868 by California State Senator Enoch H. Pardee. His son, George Pardee, a Governor of California, also inhabited the house, inheriting it after his father's death. After George's death in 1941, it passed on to his two daughters, Madeline and Helen (the same name as her mother), who lived in the house until their deaths in 1980 and 1981 respectively.

The interior of the house is the main attraction of the museum. George's wife Helen collected knick-knacks from all over the world, including scrimshaw from Alaska, tobacco pipes from the Philippines, and a giant elk head. She was fond of giving house tours to show off her collection. All of the furnishings are original and the house looks as it did in 1981.

The original carriage house and stable are still standing and the entire complex is part of Oakland's Preservation Park Historic District. The house was to be demolished for the construction of Interstate 980, but conservationists were able to save the building. It opened as a public museum in 1991.
