= 1885 Chinese expulsion from Eureka =

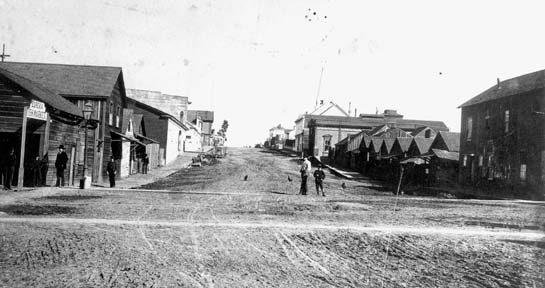
- Eureka Chinatown 1885
- Location: Eureka, California
- Date: February 7, 1885
- Attack type: Ethnic cleansing
- Victim: Eureka Chinese
- Perpetrator: Eureka city government
- Motive: Sinophobia, racial discrimination

1885 Chinese expulsion from Eureka was an ethnic cleansing event that took place in Eureka, California on February 7, 1885.

== Background ==
Anti-Chinese sentiment in the United States had been rising since mid-19th century. Numerous anti-Chinese riots broke out in the west, including California. The San Francisco riot of 1877 led to the formation of the Workingmen's Party of California that same year; its slogan "The Chinese must go!" served to further incite resentment toward Chinese immigrants. The growing sinophobia was reflected in 1882 when the United States Congress passed the Chinese Exclusion Act, ceasing Chinese immigration.

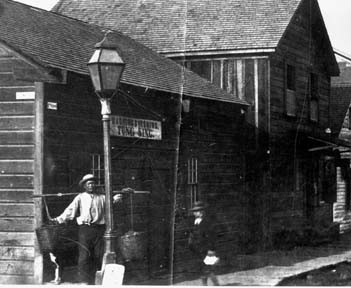
Eureka Chinatown laundry

In the Humboldt Bay area, the logging industry drew Chinese laborers, who formed a Chinatown in Eureka around Fourth and E streets. By 1880 the Chinese population in Eureka was reported to be 96.

== Expulsion ==
On the evening of February 6, 1885, around 6 pm, Eureka City Councilman David Kendall was caught in the crossfire of two rival Chinese gangs and killed. Two hundred feet from Chinatown was Centennial Hall (built a decade before to celebrate the 100th anniversary of the Declaration of Independence), where a crowd of over 600 whites gathered and decided to evict the Chinese.

Next day, February 7, city resolutions were passed stipulating that "all Chinamen be expelled from the city and that none be allowed to return."

A Committee of Fifteen organized the systemic deportation of virtually all 480 Chinese residents aboard two steamships to San Francisco; only a few Chinese managed to stay within the county.

Amazingly, no fatalities occurred during the expulsion, but Chinatown was demolished, with nothing left behind. To this day, there are few Asians in Humboldt County.

== Aftermath ==
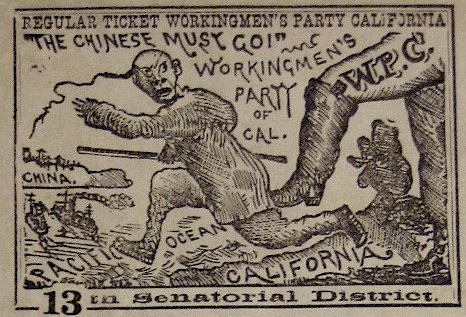
Workingmen's Party of California ticket, 1879

This "peaceful" method of expelling Chinese was touted as The Eureka Method (or Eureka Plan), and served as a model for Chinese expulsions in other California cities, including Crescent City (1885), Arcata (1886), Ferndale (1906), as well as other towns along the west coast such as Tacoma, Washington (1885).

In 1886 the San Francisco Chinese Six Companies sued the city of Eureka in Wing Hing vs. Eureka, demanding reparations and financial compensation as a consequence of the expulsion, but the case was dropped since the Chinese could not own land, they had lost no property. The same year, the city hosted its largest anti-Chinese mass meeting to date, packing Centennial Hall and featuring such speakers as former state senator Pierce H. Ryan and future governor James Gillett.

In 1890, the Humboldt County business directory boasted it is "The Only County in the State Containing No Chinamen".

Exclusion of Chinese and other Asians in Eureka continued well into the 20th century. In 1941, the Eureka City Council revised its charter:

Sec. 190 No Chinese shall ever be employed, either directly or indirectly on any work of the city, or in the performance of any contract or sub-contract of the city, except in punishment of a crime. Nor shall any provisions, supplies, materials, or articles of Chinese manufacture or production ever be use or purchased by or furnished to the city.

This section was not removed from Eureka's charter until 1959.
