= USS Wahaka =

Tugboat of the United States Navy

History

United States
- Name: USS Wahaka
- Namesake: Wahaka, a former Ahwanechee village at the base of the rock known as "Wahaka" or "The Three Brothers," in Yosemite Valley, Mariposa County, California.
- Builder: Mare Island Navy Yard, Vallejo, California
- Laid down: 2 June 1945
- Launched: 9 September 1945
- Completed: 3 December 1945
- Stricken: 30 September 1985
- Fate: Sold

General characteristics
- Class & type: Sassaba-class harbor tug
- Displacement: 310 tons (full)
- Length: 101 ft 0 in (30.78 m)
- Beam: 28 ft 0 in (8.53 m)
- Draft: 11 ft 0 in (3.35 m)
- Speed: 12 knots
- Complement: 10

USS Wahaka (YTB-526), later YTM-526, was a yard tug placed in commission in 1947.

Wahaka was laid down on 2 June 1945 at Jacksonville, Florida, by the Gibbs Gas Engine Company, Inc. and launched on 9 September 1945, sponsored by Mrs. Charles Strohmeyer, wife of Lieutenant Charles Strohmeyer, an officer who was attached to the Industrial Manager's Office, Jacksonville, Florida. She was completed on 3 December 1945.

Allocated to the 11th Naval District at San Diego, California, upon completion, Wahaka was briefly placed in reserve before being activated once more in December 1947 for service in the 6th Naval District. She operated out of Charleston, South Carolina, through the 1950s, providing tug and tow service as well as pilot assistance.

From 1961 to 1963, Wahaka was assigned to Naval Station Rota at Rota, Spain.

In 1962, Wahaka was reclassified as a medium harbor tug and redesignated YTM-526. She was then assigned to Advanced Bases, Atlantic Area. She remained active in that assignment into 1979. Wahaka was stricken from the Naval Vessel Register on 30 September 1985 and was later sold.
