= Nova Iorque =

- Municipality
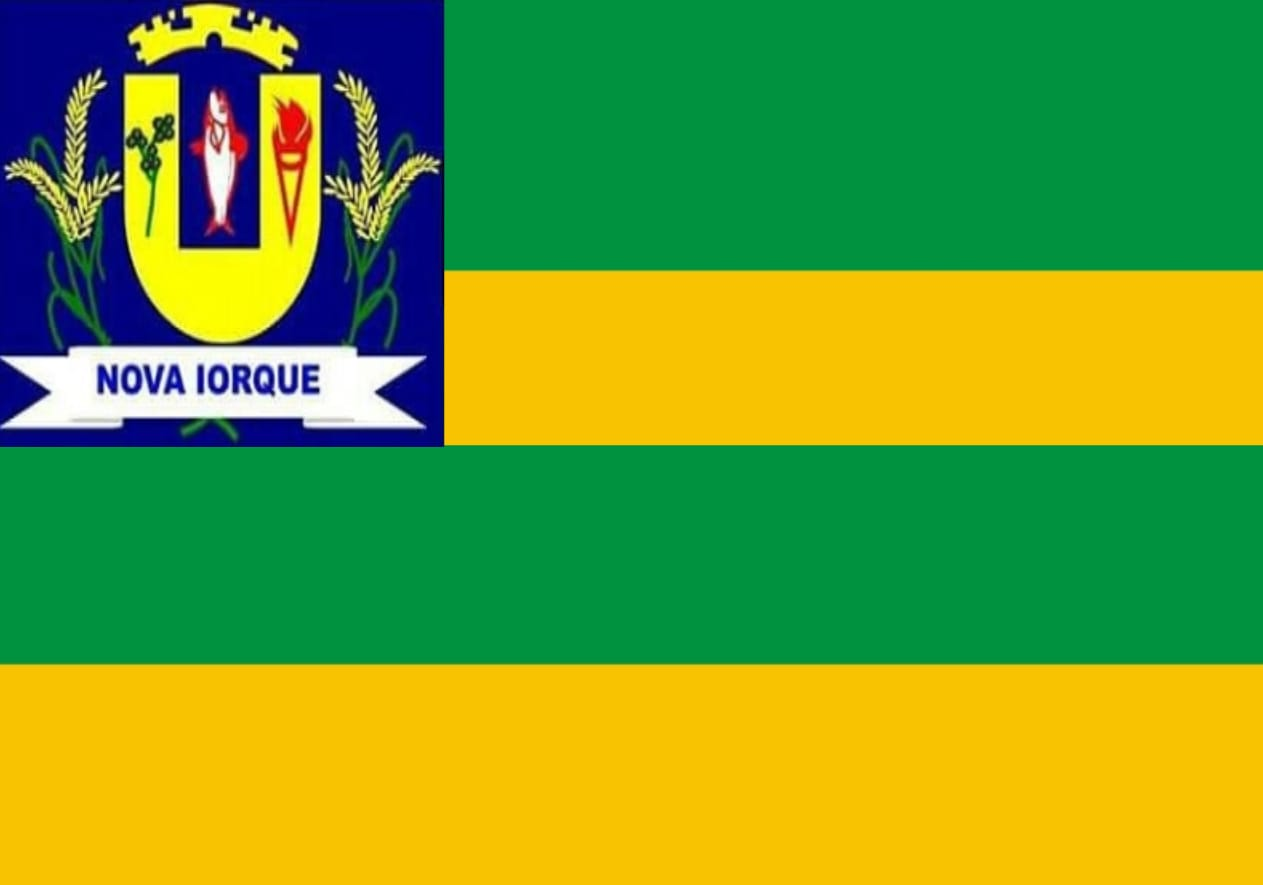
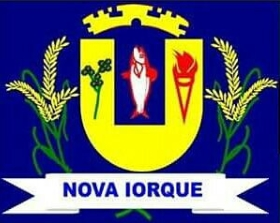
- Flag Coat of arms

- Location in Maranhão state

- Location in Brazil
- Coordinates: 06°44′02″S 44°02′38″W
- Country: Brazil
- Region: Northeast
- State: Maranhão
- Named for: New York City, United States

Government
  - Mayor: Daniel Franco de Castro (PL)

Area
  - Total: 977 km^{2} (377 sq mi)

Population (2020)
  - Total: 4,682
  - Density: 4.79/km^{2} (12.4/sq mi)
- Time zone: UTC−3 (BRT)
- Area code: +55 (99)
- Website: http://www.novaiorque.ma.gov.br/portal/

Nova Iorque (English: New York) is a Brazilian municipality in the state of Maranhão. Its population is 4,682 (2020) and the total area is 977 km^{2}.
