= Henry T. Gage =

American politician (1852–1924)

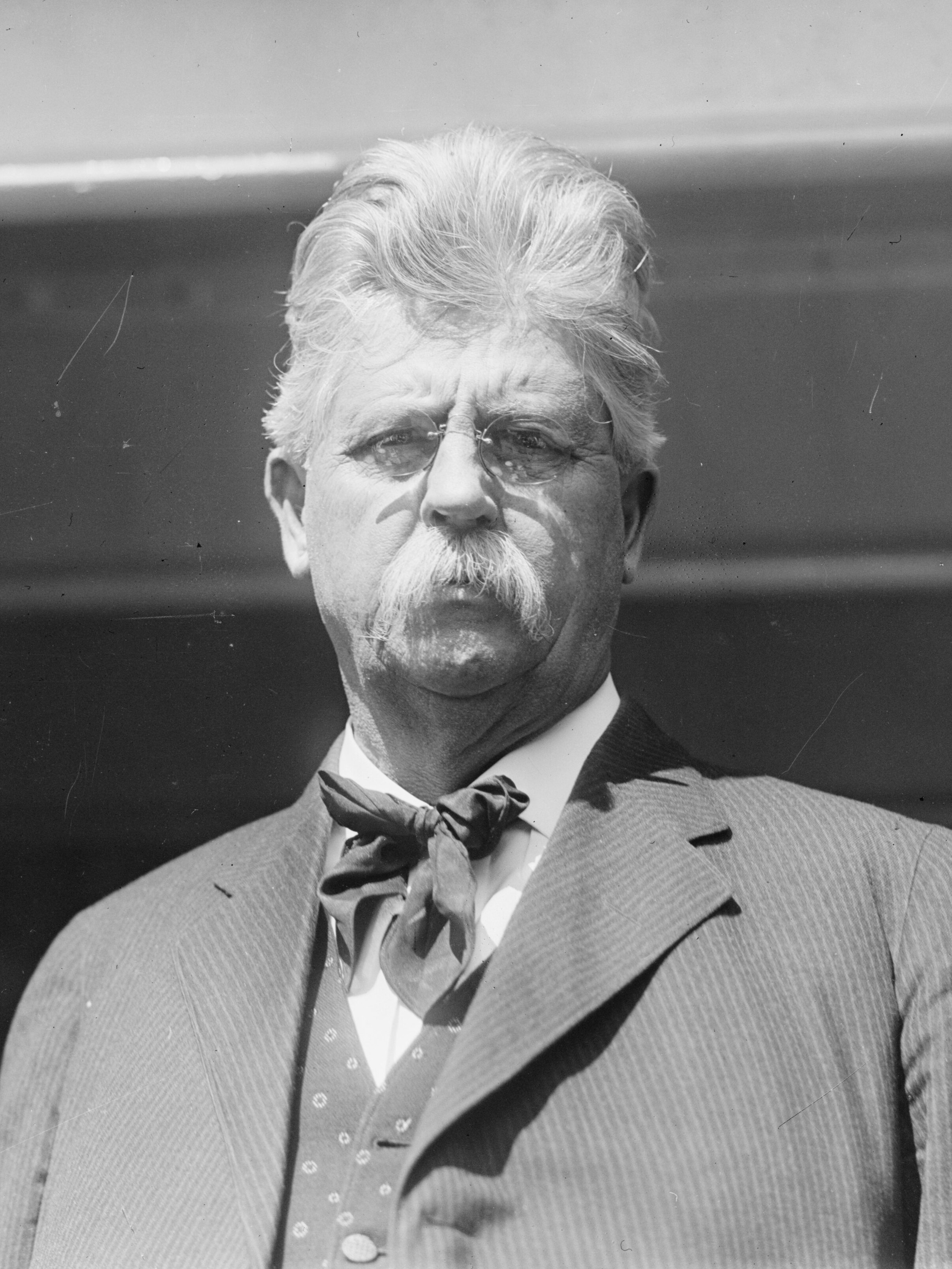
- Gage in 1910

United States Minister to Portugal
- In office June 11, 1910 – November 19, 1910
- President: William Howard Taft
- Preceded by: Charles Page Bryan
- Succeeded by: Edwin Vernon Morgan

20th Governor of California
- In office January 4, 1899 – January 7, 1903
- Lieutenant: Jacob H. Neff
- Preceded by: James Budd
- Succeeded by: George Pardee

Personal details
- Born: Henry Tifft Gage; December 25, 1852 Geneva, New York, U.S.
- Died: August 28, 1924 (aged 71) Los Angeles, California, U.S.
- Party: Republican
- Spouse: Frances V. Rains
- Children: 5
- Profession: Lawyer, politician, diplomat

Henry Tifft Gage (December 25, 1852 – August 28, 1924) was an American lawyer, politician and diplomat. A Republican, Gage was elected to a single term as the 20th governor of California from 1899 to 1903. Gage was also the U.S. Minister to Portugal for several months in 1910.

== Biography ==
Gage was born on Christmas Day, 1852 in Geneva, New York. Relocating with his family to East Saginaw, Michigan, he spent his teenage years in Michigan, studying law with his lawyer father. In 1873 at the age of 21, Gage was admitted to the Michigan Bar, working for his father's law practice in East Saginaw for over a year. Over a year later, Gage relocated to California, settling in Los Angeles. Between 1874 and 1877, Gage was a successful sheep dealer, selling sheep to various farms around Los Angeles County. In 1877, Gage returned to law, opening his own practice. Largely successful in court, his practice quickly began to attract a number of prominent corporate clients in Southern California, including the Southern Pacific Railroad, who would enjoy a decades-long relationship with Gage. Three years later, Gage married Francesca V. Rains, a great-granddaughter of a Californio family. The Gages settled in Bell Gardens at his wife's family home.

Running as a Republican, Gage was elected as Los Angeles City Attorney in 1881, beginning a slow rise within party ranks. At the 1888 Republican National Convention in Chicago, Gage was chosen as a delegate-at-large during the proceedings. In a speech to the convention, Gage seconded the motion to nominate Levi P. Morton as the party's nomination for the vice presidency.

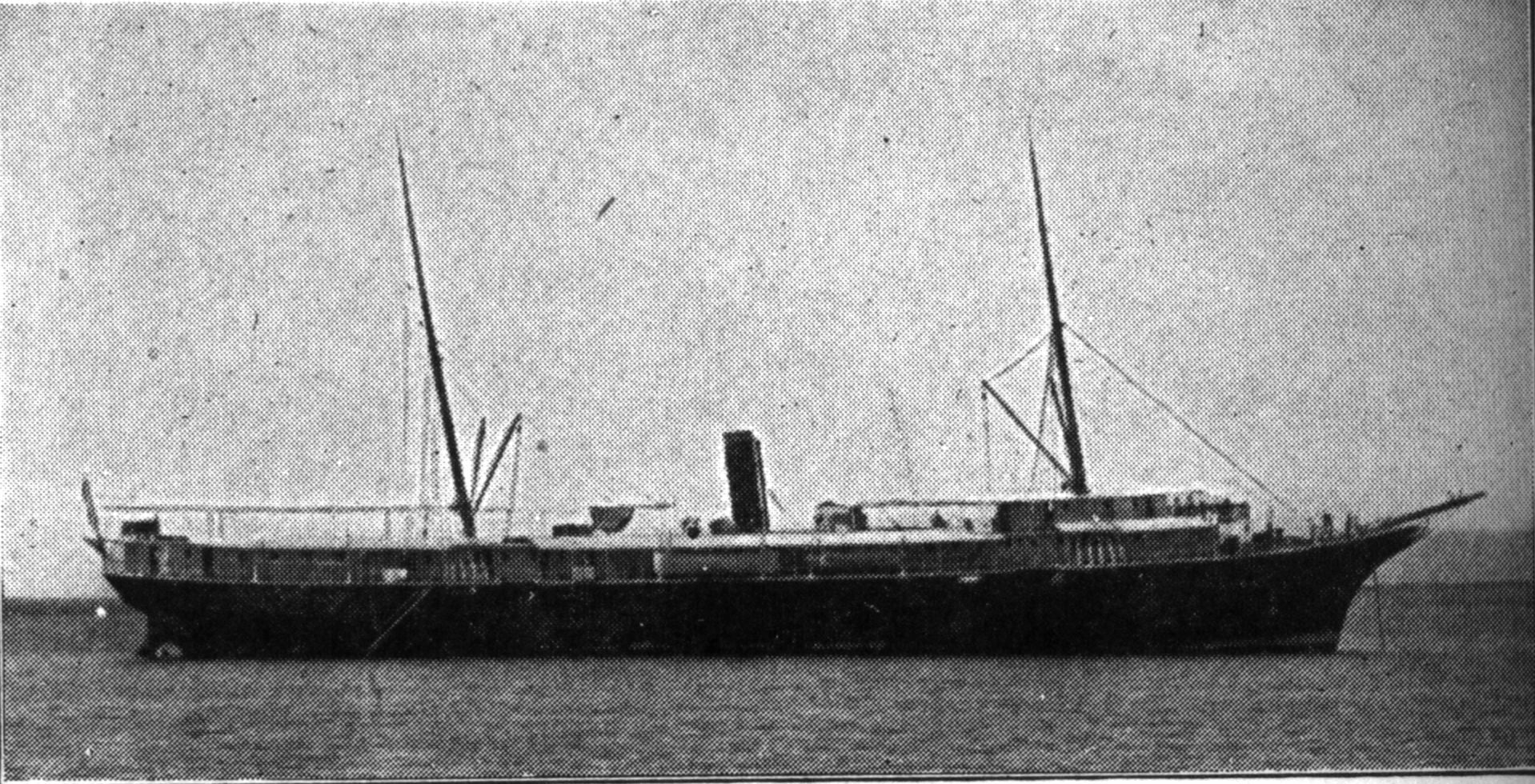
S.S. Itata in San Diego Bay in 1891

In 1891, President Benjamin Harrison appointed Gage as a federal prosecutor to prosecute the crew of the Chilean steamer Itata due to the Itata Incident. The U.S. federal government charged the crew with knowingly assisting an illegal arms purchase. Its cargo had consisted of weapons purchased for National Congressional insurgent forces fighting in the 1891 Chilean Civil War against President José Manuel Balmaceda. Upon review of the federal government's case, Gage dropped all charges against Itata's crew, claiming that the government had mistaken the arms purchase as illegal.

By 1898, Gage had become a prominent corporate lawyer within Los Angeles business circles, as well as a successful owner of real estate, particularly the Red Rover gold mine in Acton in the Santa Clarita Valley. At the state Republican convention that year, Gage was chosen in the first round of voting as the party's nominee for the governorship. His nomination was largely orchestrated by the Southern Pacific Railroad, who had worked with Gage since the 1870s, and saw him as supportive of their interests.

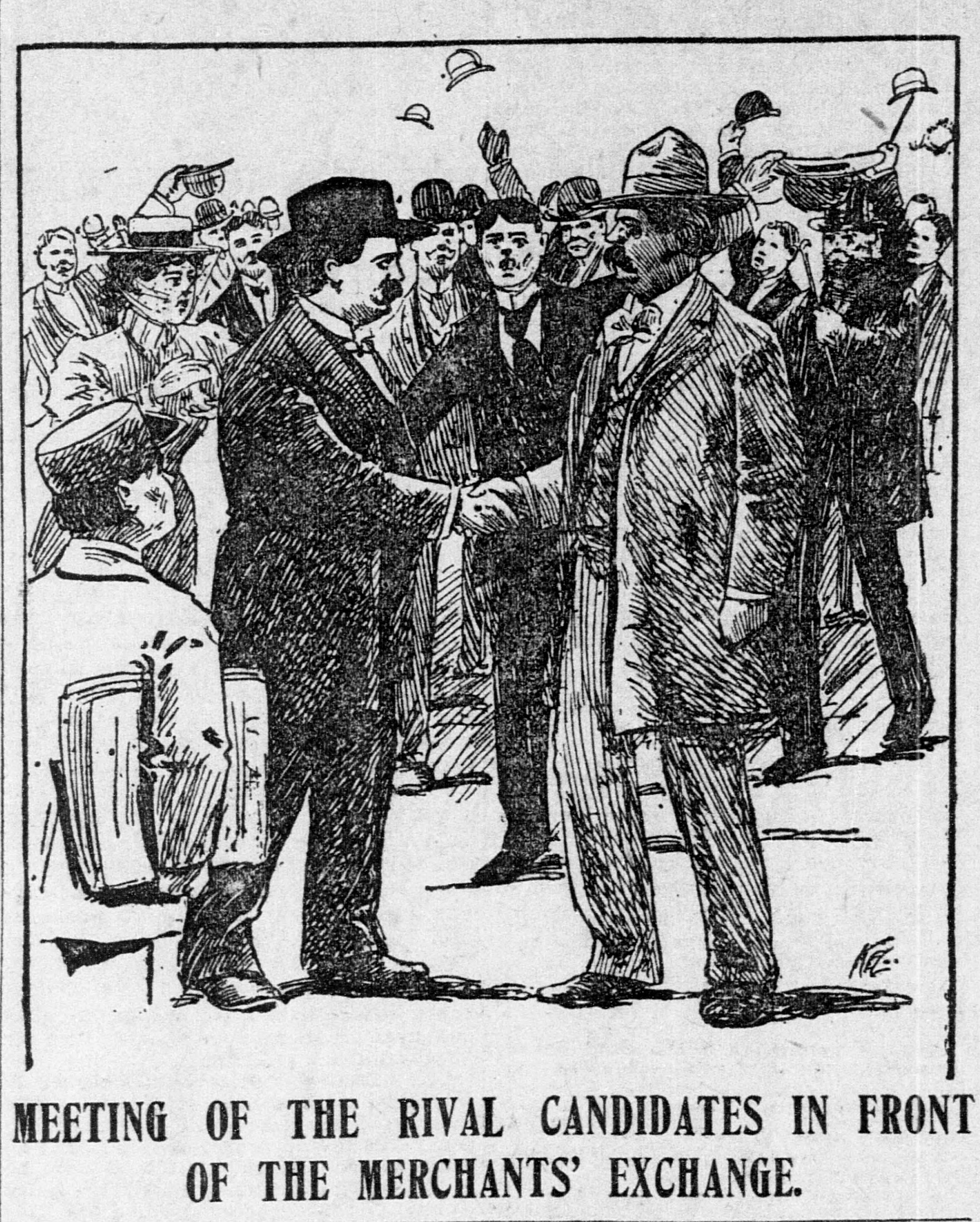
Gage (right) shakes hands with his opponent, Democrat James G. Maguire, outside the Merchants Exchange Building in San Francisco, October 8, 1898

In the 1898 California gubernatorial election, Gage defeated his Democratic rival, U.S. Representative James G. Maguire by 6.7%. Other minor candidates in the election included Job Harriman of the Socialist Labor Party of America and Prohibitionist J.E. McComas, a former State Senator.

== Governorship ==
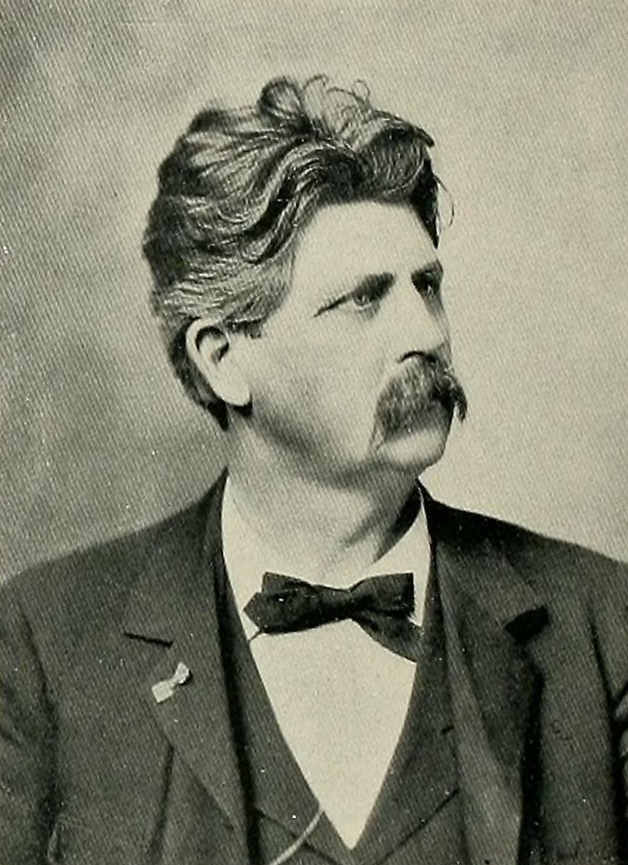
Gage c. 1898

Gage was inaugurated as the 20th governor of California on January 4, 1899. In his inauguration speech, Gage spoke at length about foreign policy, viewing with favor the recent results of the Spanish–American War and their effect on California's economy. "The peaceful acquisition of the Hawaiian Islands, extending our empire beyond our Pacific shore, should be followed as a political necessity by the annexation of the Philippines," Gage stated. "The center of commerce must move westward. California, favorably situated, will, among other advantages, reap the harvest of trade with these new territories, developing our many varied and growing resources, creating a western merchant marine for the carriage of our imports and exports, and luring to our markets the nations of the world."

In one of his first acts, Gage's administration reopened the State Printing Office, which had been closed down by Governor James Budd to cut governmental expenditures.

From early on in his administration, Gage was highly partisan, mostly because of frequent accusations from Reform Republicans and Democrats alike who accused Gage as being a pawn for the Southern Pacific. When a newspaper published a political cartoon portraying railroad tycoon Collis Potter Huntington leading the governor around on a leash, Gage was so incensed by the accusation that he ramrodded a censorship bill through the California State Legislature, restricting the press whenever editorial content involved politics or politicians.

=== San Francisco bubonic plague outbreak ===
On January 3, 1900, Gage held a legislative session to discuss ways to improve San Francisco's port in attempt to increase trading with Asia. He also wanted to bring back the State Quarantine Service which had recently been removed. The federal Marine Hospital Service on Angel Island was responsible for the inspection of all incoming ships and preventing all foreign diseases from coming into California. Reintroduction of the State Quarantine Service would provide Gage with more oversight and ability to minimize threats of quarantine. However, the session was adjourned before any action upon the request could take place. From 1900 onwards, Gage's administration was often rocky. That year, the ship Australia laid anchor in the Port of San Francisco, unknowingly bringing to the city rats carrying the Third Pandemic of the bubonic plague. The disease soon made home in the cramped ghetto quarters of the city's Chinatown. Rumors of the plague's presence abounded in the city, quickly gaining the notice of authorities from the federal Marine Hospital Service, including the Marine Hospital Service's head in San Francisco, Joseph J. Kinyoun.

Allied with powerful railroad and city business interests, Gage publicly denied the existence of any pestilence outbreak in the city, fearing that any word of the plague's presence would deeply damage the city and state's economy. Supportive newspapers, such as the San Francisco Call, San Francisco Chronicle and the San Francisco Bulletin, echoed Gage's denials, beginning what was to become an intense defamation campaign against Joseph Kinyoun, director of the San Francisco Quarantine Station. In response to the state's refuting of the plague's existence, U.S. Surgeon General Walter Wyman recommended to federal Treasury Secretary Lyman J. Gage (no relation to the governor) to intervene. Secretary Gage agreed, creating a three-man medical commission to medically investigate the city. The commission conclusively discovered that bubonic plague was present.

Like Kinyoun, the Treasury commission's findings were again immediately denounced by Governor Gage. Gage believed the federal government's growing presence in the matter was a gross intrusion of what he recognized as a state concern. In his retaliation, Gage denied the federal commission any use of the University of California, Berkeley's laboratories to further study the outbreak. The Bulletin would also attack the federal commission, branding it as a "youthful and inexperienced trio".

The clash between Gage and federal authorities intensified. Surgeon General Wyman instructed Kinyoun to place Chinatown under quarantine, as well as blocking all East Asians from entering state borders. Upon hearing Kinyoun's announcement, Gage sent telegrams and spread the word to California's elected officials, party leaders, and even delegates of the National Convention. He encouraged them to speak with the President about cancelling the quarantine and removing Kinyoun from his duties. This event along with the help of San Francisco newspapers sparked the campaign to remove and discredit Kinyoun. Chinese residents, supported by Gage and local businesses, fought the quarantine through numerous federal court battles, claiming the Marine Hospital Service was violating their rights under the Fourteenth Amendment, and in the process, launched lawsuits against Kinyoun. In these court proceedings, residents insisted Gage was correct in his denials of the plague outbreak. The courts initially agreed that Chinatown residents were correct in that the quarantine violated their civil rights, yet most of these lawsuits were eventually thrown out of court on later dates.

Between 1901 and 1902, the plague outbreak continued to worsen. On January 8, 1901, Gage pushed to allow the state health board members to delegate the local health units in attempt to monitor and control cases regarding the plague. In a 1901 address to both houses of the California State Legislature, Gage accused federal authorities, particularly Kinyoun, of injecting bubonic plague into cadavers. In response to what he said to be massive scaremongering by the Marine Hospital Service, Gage pushed a censorship bill through the legislature to gag any media reports of plague infection. The legislation failed, yet laws to gag reports amongst the medical community succeeded in passage and were signed into law by the governor. In addition, $100,000 was allocated to a public campaign led by Gage to deny the plague's existence. Privately, however, Gage sent a special commission to Washington, consisting of Southern Pacific, newspaper and shipping lawyers to negotiate a settlement with the Marine Hospital Service, whereby the federal government would remove Kinyoun from San Francisco with the promise that the state would secretly cooperate with the Marine Hospital Service in stamping out the plague outbreak.

Secret cooperations included preventive measures such as inspection, isolation and disinfection. Gage and Mayor Phelan provided funding to inspect and disinfect Chinatown of any signs of the plague. To the public, however, this was marketed as a cleanup campaign that was renovating and getting rid of the town's filth. Despite the secret agreement allowing for Kinyoun's removal, Gage went back on his promise of assisting federal authorities and continued to obstruct their efforts for study and quarantine. A report issued by the State Board of Health on September 16, 1901, bolstered Gage's claims, denying the plague's outbreak.

=== Labor agitation ===
As Gage fought his growing battle with the federal government, labor agitation was starting to spill over along the San Francisco waterfront. In July 1901, members of the International Brotherhood of Teamsters went on strike, protesting against recent orders to haul luggage for a non-unionized cargo company. The Teamsters strike was quickly joined by sympathizing sailors, stevedores and fireman belonging to the City Front Federation. Between 10,000 and 16,000 men joined the strike.

Employers grew quickly frustrated with the strikers, asking for San Francisco Mayor James D. Phelan to request Gage in ordering in the state militia to crush the strike. Phelan refused, though violence between strikers and officers of the San Francisco Police Department began to break out in September.

Gage became increasingly concerned that violence along San Francisco's waterfront was spilling out of the city's control. On one instance, in order to reassure himself that violence was not increasing, Gage disguised himself as a striker and walked amongst the stevedores to observe conditions personally. In October, Gage negotiated settlement with employers and the Teamsters, though the terms of the settlement were never made publicly known. Gage was the first California governor to negotiate an end to a labor strike.

=== End of administration ===
Gage's troubles over the bubonic plague continued to worsen. Despite San Francisco-based newspapers continual denials, contradicting reports from the Sacramento Bee and the Associated Press on the plague's spread had made the outbreak become publicly known throughout the United States. The state governments of Colorado, Texas and Louisiana passed quarantines of California, arguing that since the state had refused to admit a health crisis within its borders, states receiving rail or shipping cargo from California ports of call had the duty to protect themselves. Threats of a national quarantine grew.

As the 1902 elections approached, Southern Pacific supporters increasingly saw Gage, a man who had represented their interests since his days as a Los Angeles-based lawyer, as an embarrassment to state Republicans. This harmed Gage whose allies were mostly business interests. However, instead of putting allegations of the outbreak to rest, conflicting studies and reports from federal officials and the media continued to contradict Gage's assertions. In turn, the powerful shipping and rail companies within the state and throughout the country faced quarantine and economic boycotts from other states.

At the state Republican convention that year, the Railroad Republican faction refused Gage renomination for the governorship. In his place, former Mayor of Oakland George Pardee, a German-trained physician, received the nomination. Pardee's nomination was largely a compromise between the Railroad and the growing progressive-minded Reform factions of the party.

In his final address to the California State Legislature in early January 1903, Gage continued to publicly deny the outbreak, blaming the federal government, in particular Joseph Kinyoun, the Marine Hospital Service and the San Francisco Board of Health, for damaging the state's economy.

In my first biennial message, January 7, 1901, I referred, at some length, to the subject of certain false and exaggerated reports concerning the alleged existence of bubonic plague in San Francisco, which, through the interest, ignorance, or recklessness of a few persons, were indiscriminately published in the year 1900, and thereafter intermittently continued.
The falsity of the reports has been frequently proved, but, unfortunately, through the ill-designed efforts and action of Dr. J. J. Kinyoun, assuming to represent the United States Marine Hospital Service at San Francisco, and of the members of the San Francisco Board of Health, much damage nevertheless accrued to the various commercial, industrial, and other productive interests of the State, injuring alike the laborer, merchant, farmer, and fruit-grower.

— Governor Henry T. Gage, Journals of the Senate and Assembly of California, 35th Session, vol. 1. 1903

== Post governorship ==
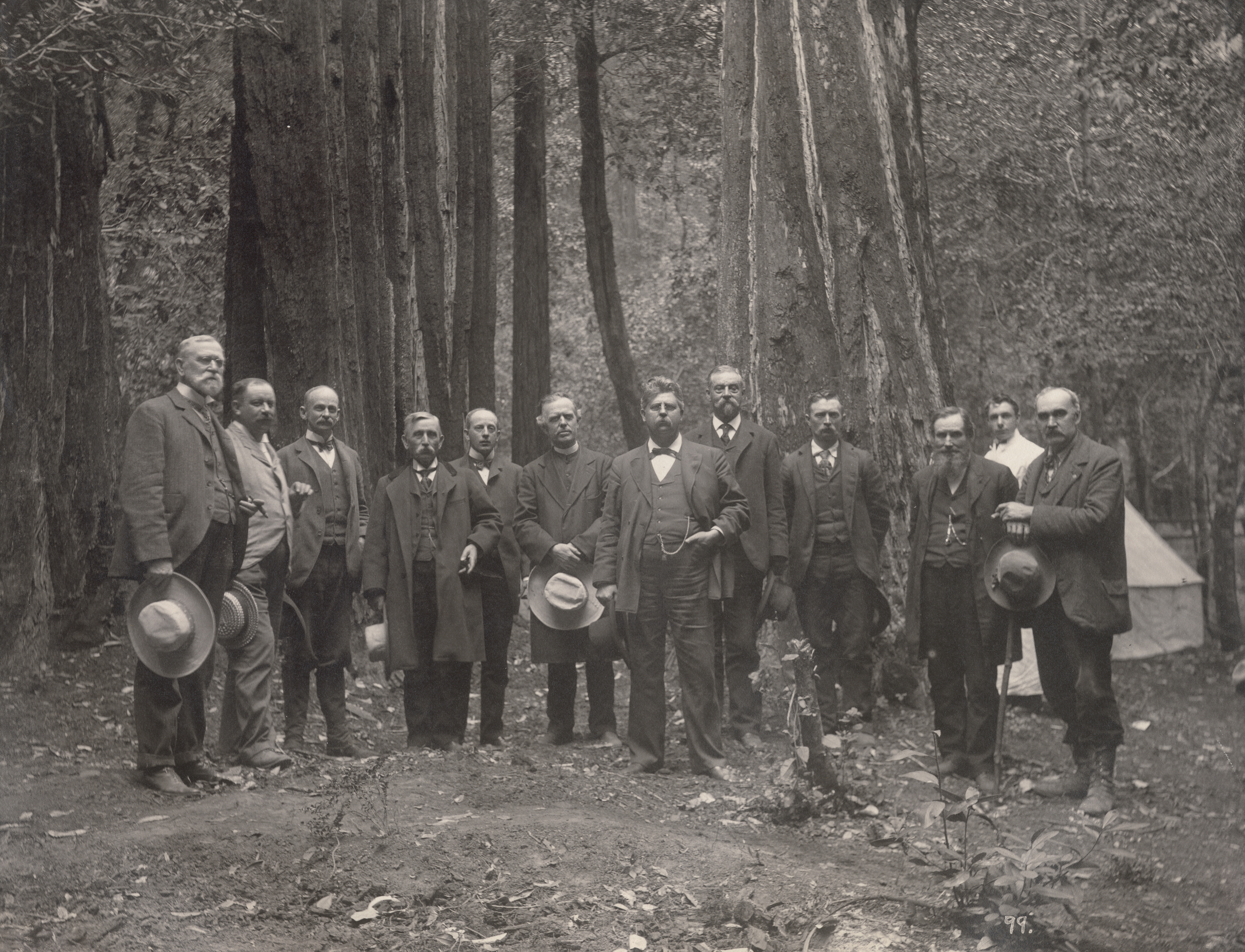
Ex-Governor Gage (seventh from left) with members of the Redwood Park Commission, including Robert E. Kenna (sixth from left), at Big Basin State Park, 1911

After leaving Sacramento, Gage returned to Los Angeles to resume his law practice. In 1909, President William Howard Taft appointed Gage as U.S. Minister to Portugal. Gage served in Lisbon for a little more than five months until November 1910. Political instability in Portugal, due to the Revolution of 1910 that deposed King Manuel II, as well as his wife's deteriorating health, forced Gage to submit his resignation to the U.S. Department of State and President Taft. He returned to California shortly afterwards.

Gage died in Los Angeles on August 28, 1924, at the age of 71.

== Legacy ==
Despite his administration being characterized by historians as both rocky and incompetent, a lasting legacy of Gage's tenure of office was his signing off on the establishment of California Polytechnic State University in 1901.

In 1902, Gage appointed Ulysses S. Webb as California Attorney General. Webb became one of the most successful attorneys general in the history of California and its longest-serving (37 years, until his retirement in 1939).

Gage Avenue in Los Angeles was named after the former governor on October 28, 1929. Henry T. Gage Middle School, located on Gage Avenue, also is named after him.

The Henry Gage Mansion is a California Historic Landmark (No. 984), given the designation on May 26, 1989. Located in Bell Gardens, the Gage Mansion, built in 1795, is the oldest remaining home in Los Angeles County.

Party political offices
Preceded by Morris M. Estee	Republican nominee for Governor of California; 1898	Succeeded by George Pardee
Political offices
Preceded by James Budd	Governor of California; 1899–1903	Succeeded by George Pardee
Diplomatic posts
Preceded by Charles Page Bryan	United States Minister to Portugal; June 11, 1910–November 19, 1910	Succeeded by Edwin V. Morgan
