= George Pardee =

American doctor of medicine and politician (1857–1941)

George Cooper Pardee
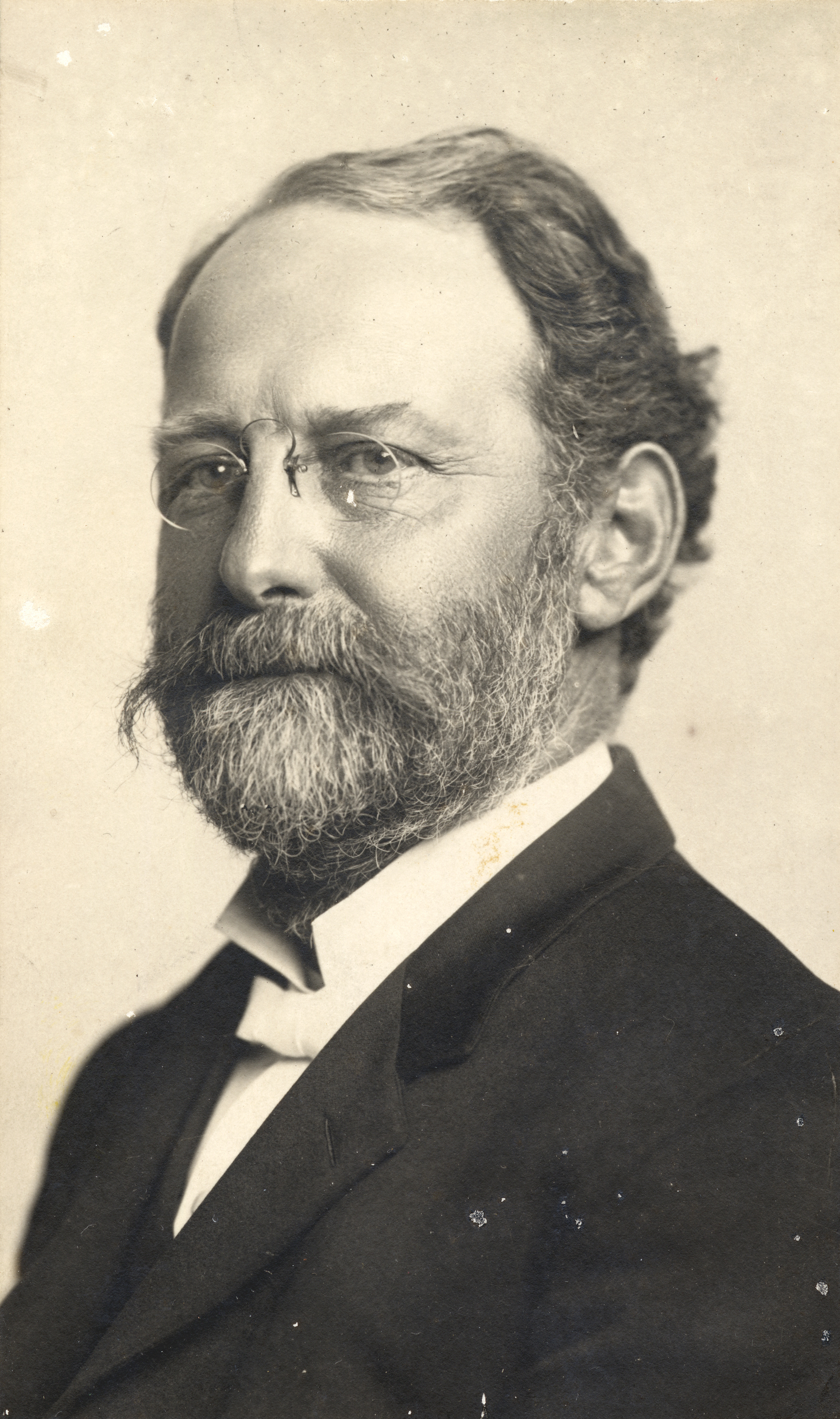
- Pardee c. 1911

21st Governor of California
- In office January 7, 1903 – January 9, 1907
- Lieutenant: Alden Anderson
- Preceded by: Henry Gage
- Succeeded by: James Gillett

29th Mayor of Oakland
- In office March 13, 1893 – March 10, 1895
- Preceded by: Melvin C. Chapman
- Succeeded by: John L. Davie

Personal details
- Born: July 25, 1857 San Francisco, California, U.S.
- Died: September 1, 1941 (aged 84) Oakland, California, U.S.
- Party: Republican
- Spouse: Helen Newhall Penniman
- Children: 4
- Parent: Enoch H. Pardee (father)
- Profession: Physician, politician

Military service
- Allegiance: United States
- Branch/service: California National Guard
- Years of service: 1873–1876; 1885–1892
- Rank: Lieutenant Colonel
- Unit: Company A, 5th Infantry Regiment, 2nd Brigade

George Cooper Pardee (July 25, 1857 – September 1, 1941) was an American doctor of medicine and Republican politician. As the 21st governor of California, holding office from January 7, 1903, to January 9, 1907, Pardee was the second native-born Californian to assume the governorship, after Romualdo Pacheco, and the first governor born in California after statehood.

== Early life and career ==
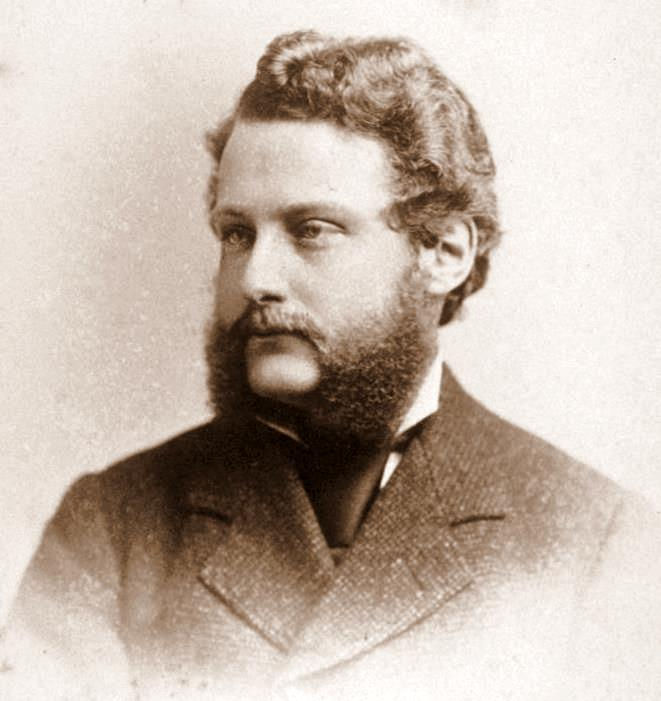
Pardee in 1879

Pardee was born on July 25, 1857, in San Francisco, California, the only child of Enoch H. Pardee and Mary Pardee. The Pardee family was well known in the San Francisco Bay Area. His father was a prominent oculist in San Francisco and Oakland. Enoch's stature within the community helped him get elected to the California State Assembly in the early 1870s, and later as the mayor of Oakland for a single term from 1876 to 1878.

Raised in the Pardee Home in Oakland, George Pardee closely followed in his father's medical background. He attended the nearby University of California, Berkeley, then studied medicine at the Cooper Medical College in San Francisco. In 1885, Pardee traveled abroad to receive his medical degree at the University of Leipzig in the German Empire. After his return from Germany, Pardee joined his father's medical practice, specializing in eye and ear diseases. He also served in the California National Guard from 1873 to 1876 and again from 1885 to 1892, rising to the rank of lieutenant colonel and surgeon on the staff of general John T. Cutting.

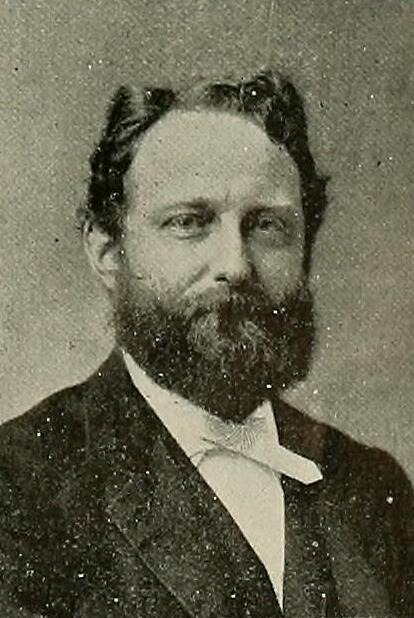
Pardee c. 1891

Like his father, Enoch, Pardee also developed an early interest in politics. By the early 1890s, Pardee had become an active member of the Republican Party, and was elected to the Oakland Board of Health and the Oakland City Council. In 1893, following a successful election, Pardee became the 29th mayor of Oakland, serving a single two-year term until 1895. During his mayoralship, Pardee began a public battle with the Southern Pacific Railroad's ownership of the Port of Oakland. At one point, Pardee kicked down a piece of the port's fence erected by the Southern Pacific out of anger.

== Governorship ==
Pardee (left) and major general Arthur MacArthur Jr. during joint maneuvers between the U.S. Army and the California National Guard in San Luis Obispo County, August 1904

During the San Francisco plague, Pardee's quick rise in East Bay politics was noticed by the state Republican leadership prior to the 1902 gubernatorial election. Deeply embarrassed and financially hurt by the denials of an ongoing bubonic plague outbreak in San Francisco's Chinatown by Governor Henry Gage, Republicans withdrew their support of Gage during the state convention. The party, divided by Railroad Republicans with the backing of the Southern Pacific Railroad and Reform Republicans of the growing Progressive movement, nominated Pardee, due to his municipal and medical background, as a compromise candidate. Despite clashes in the past with their interests, Southern Pacific Republicans believed Pardee the better candidate against the Democratic contender Franklin K. Lane, a San Francisco City Attorney and an ardent anti-Southern Pacific campaigner.

In the 1902 election, Pardee faced a four-way race between the Democrats' Lane, Socialist Gideon Brower and Prohibitionist Theodore Kanouse. Pardee barely edged over Lane, winning the governorship with a plurality of 0.9%. Less than 3,000 votes separated the two leading candidates.

=== San Francisco Bubonic Plague ===
Pardee took office on January 7, 1903. At the start of his term, Pardee did not fully acknowledge the presence of plague in San Francisco. Preceding his inauguration, the Public Health and Marine Hospital Service act was created by Congress on July 1, 1902. This act established that state health officials could initiate a surgeon general call conference, upon request. Due to the uncertainty and fear of the plague, a conference call was requested by eleven states to discuss the plague situation in California. In response, Walter Wyman, Surgeon General, called for a conference to be held on January 19, 1903, at Washington, D.C. Under the Public Health and Marine Hospital Service law, each state had to send one state health board representative to a surgeon general call conference. The problem for California was that the state health board officers, previously headed by former governor, Henry Gage, strongly denied the presence of the plague. In efforts to rectify this dilemma, Surgeon Arthur H. Glennan from the U.S Public Health Service was tasked with working with the new governor, Pardee. With his efforts, Matthew Gardner, former surgeon-in-chief of Southern Pacific Railroad, was selected to represent California at the conference.

San Francisco was the heart of trade and commerce. Due to plague rumors, San Francisco commercial circles were alarmed by the advances of the Northwestern Railway and Northern Pacific Railways success. During this time, Northwestern Railway and Northern Pacific Railways wanted to divert commerce towards the western states. A preliminary meeting was held on January 18, 1903, a day before the conference call. Other state health officials that attended were hostile to Gardner, believing that California health officials were interested more in railroad business. Gardner acknowledged the presence of plague and promised to provide statements from Pardee and San Francisco Mayor Eugene Schmitz, promising to undertake a sanitary campaign and eradication. Pardee promised to fulfill all the conditions the officials wanted. But the officials did not take his promise into consideration and voted to change the location troop transport from San Francisco. On the day of the conference call, Wyman discussed inspection results, revealing no detection of plague. But he also did acknowledge it was not fully eradicated. Many health officials were not happy with this answer and proposed two plans. The first plan pertained to the federal support system, which Wyman objected to. The second plan suggested placing embargoes on California borders, where railroads entered, if health officials were not actively participating in plague eradication. This conference concluded the presence of bubonic plague in California and blamed Governor Henry Gage and his state health board for his negligence in acknowledging and eradicating plague. Wyman, after the conference, firmly stated that acknowledging plague would not affect trade. In hopes to avoid a quarantine, Gardner urged Pardee to recognize bubonic plague in San Francisco.

Pardee had won the governor election by a narrow margin. He feared that acknowledging the plague would divide the already split Republican Party. Shortly after his inauguration, Pardee and Glennan met privately. He readily supported the U.S. Public Health Service and agreed to remove state inspectors in Chinatown. Pardee also complied to the resolutions established at the conference. But he continued to avoid directly addressing the presence of plague. He stated any disease regardless of plague required sanitary control. Wyman believed Pardee's stance did not reassure the country health officials and urged Glennan to address the issue again with Pardee and Mayor Schmitz. He believed that acknowledging the presence of plague would ease health officials and foreign countries' fear. Pardee continued to elude the topic of plague but continued to work with the government. On the other hand, Schmitz continued to deny plague existence. The unrest caused by the government and San Francisco Health Board lead to Mexico and Australia to ban San Francisco goods. This ban encouraged more cooperation with Seattle and Vancouver. San Francisco businesses established the Mercantile Joint Committee to promote sanitary and preventive measures, in an effort to prove that plague did not exist. The Mercantile Joint Committee were concerned that officially admitting plague would result in a quarantine, leading to decreased trade and commerce. Merchants continued to ignore Wyman, who was still adamant about officially acknowledging plague. Finally, Glennan stated that if there was no official address regarding plague, the U.S Public Health Service would withdraw from San Francisco. This forced the Mercantile Joint Committee to formally admit that there had been ninety three plague cases over the span of 3 years. They also asked for the support from Schmitz and Pardee to officially admit that there was no current risk or danger from plague. Schmitz was the first to sign this document. Pardee, who was resistant to this, eventually signed it. With this in place, Wyman reported that there were no new outbreaks of plague since December 1902 and Chinatown had met satisfactory sanitary conditions to business leaders. This news encouraged Mexico and other foreign countries to lift the embargoes. Under Pardee's orders, new officials were appointed for the State Health Board. His administration was now focused on being transparent and would acknowledge all plague cases. Pardee welcomed health officials to visit California and provide input regarding sanitation and sanitary conditions. On September 8, the first California State, County, and Municipal Sanitary Conference was held in San Francisco. This first meeting was able to create a community where sanitary information and preventative measures could be shared. By the end of 1904, the plague had been brought under control. Nearly 200 deaths were attributed to the outbreak.

=== Conservation and education ===
President Theodore Roosevelt and Governor George Pardee together in 1904

During his medical studies in the German Empire, Pardee was greatly influenced by Germany's push for higher education and environmental conservation during its rapid industrialization. Throughout his administration, Pardee strongly supported irrigation projects and waterworks throughout the Central Valley with the desire of increasing the state's agricultural output and providing safe drinking water from the Sierra Nevada.

Pardee's progressive ideas regarding conservation and distrust of corporate monopolies quickly placed him as an ally of President Theodore Roosevelt. Both the governor and President Roosevelt enjoyed a good working relationship during their respective terms of office on the state and federal levels. On a visit to California in 1903, Pardee was asked by Roosevelt if he would be his running mate as Vice President for the 1904 presidential election. Pardee declined, instead continuing to take an active role in state politics. Both Pardee and Roosevelt remained political allies for the next decade.

Since 1901, proposals for a state agricultural school had undergone discussion within the California State Legislature, yet no proposal had gained a serious following. Most agricultural studies in the state during the period were concentrated at UC Berkeley, but due to the climate of Berkeley, most studies remained strictly limited to organic and soil chemistry study and analysis. In 1903, an agricultural bill sponsoring a state agricultural school to give first-hand experience for future farmers passed the legislature. Pardee vetoed the bill, explaining that he was not hostile to the idea of an agricultural school, but wanted a less vague proposal.

The Legislature drafted a more detailed bill, the University Farm Bill, in 1905. In it, the bill specified that a future state agricultural school would need a location already irrigated, with provisions for ideal soil and climatic conditions, as well as water and land rights. Pardee agreed, and signed the bill into law. For the next year, an agricultural commission sponsored by Pardee investigated more than fifty sites from Glenn County to Fresno. In 1906, Pardee announced that he decided upon Davisville in Yolo County, located nearly fifteen miles southwest of the state capital of Sacramento. Opened to students in 1908, the School of Agriculture quickly became one of the premier centers of agricultural study in the state. In 1959, the Regents of the University of California granted the school campus autonomy, designating it UC Davis.

The state of California's forests also came under Pardee's agenda. Shortly after the beginning of his administration, Pardee, with the help of Gifford Pinchot, ordered a joint state and federal commission to inspect and survey California's forests. In 1905, a State Forestry Act was passed by the legislature and signed by the governor, creating a Board of Forestry to monitor and supervise logging, land usage, and forest fires. The act, along with Pinchot's advocacy, helped influence President Roosevelt to transfer federal forest land over to the U.S. Department of Agriculture, later becoming the National Forest Service. Pardee's own Board of Forestry would later evolve into the California Department of Forestry and Fire Protection.

=== 1906 San Francisco earthquake ===
In the early morning hours of April 18, 1906, a magnitude 7.7 to 8.3 earthquake struck along the San Andreas Fault, with an epicenter two miles (three km) from San Francisco, near Mussel Rock in neighboring San Mateo County. While cities as spread as Santa Rosa, San Jose and Palo Alto suffered considerable damage, San Francisco remained hardest hit, with resulting fires destroying much of the central core of the city.

As telegraphed reports slowly filtered into the Governor's Office in Sacramento, Pardee mobilized the California Army National Guard to be dispatched to San Francisco, though Pardee was unaware that federal troops of the U.S. Army, under the command Brigadier General Frederick Funston, were already patrolling the streets.

Pardee sought to take command of the situation himself, traveling to his native Oakland in the later afternoon to oversee the state response to the disaster. Making his headquarters in Oakland Mayor Frank K. Mott's office, Pardee worked twenty-hour days during the disaster, signing travel permission papers, coordinating state and federal relief funds and trains, and remaining in contact with the outside world through Oakland's undamaged telegraph lines. In addition, Pardee also visited other afflicted cities, such as San Jose and Santa Rosa, to tour and coordinate their own disaster responses.

=== Downfall ===
Pardee as depicted by cartoonist George Herriman in 1906

Despite having been heavily praised by the public for his handling of the state bureaucracy during the 1906 disaster, Pardee continued to have a strained relationship with the Southern Pacific Railroad, one that had been ongoing since the 1890s while he was Mayor of Oakland. Pardee's role in the burgeoning Progressive movement which distrusted large corporate monopolies, as well as his efforts to conserve and protect state forests, remained a constant thorn for Southern Pacific executives. A lengthy bitter battle over the Port of Oakland, which Pardee argued on behalf of Oakland that the port was a municipal rather than private corporation, dragged out for much of his governorship. The case was decided upon by the California Supreme Court in 1906, ruling in Oakland's favor. Pardee also encouraged creation of new railroad companies to break the Southern Pacific's monopolies.

At the state Republican convention in Santa Cruz to nominate the party's candidate for the governorship in the 1906 general elections, Railroad Republicans led by party machine boss Abe Ruef, sought to strip Pardee of the nomination. Southern Pacific interests within the Republicans believed Pardee as too independent and troublesome. Writing in the San Francisco Chronicle on September 1, 1906, Pardee commented that "[I]t is evident that the Railroad machine and [Abe] Ruef did not want me to be governor again, and as they were in control of the convention, what kick have I coming?"

Railroad Republicans, now dominating the Santa Cruz convention due to intense lobbying by Ruef, denied Pardee the nomination. Instead, Republicans and Southern Pacific supporters nominated U.S. House Representative James Gillett, a pro-railroad supporter. Pardee's loss of the nomination sparked anger amongst many Progressive Republican circles, fueling desires for Progressives to reform the political nomination process or to break away from the Republicans altogether. In 1912, a party split occurred with the creation of the Bull Moose Party, led by Theodore Roosevelt and California Governor Hiram Johnson, who himself would lead Progressives to control the legislature and Governor's Office throughout much of the 1910s.

In his farewell address to the California State Legislature in January 1907, Pardee demanded that the legislature take up calls for creating a direct primary law.

== Post-governorship ==
Pardee c. 1927

Leaving the governorship in 1907, he returned to serve on many national and state boards, including the National Conservation Commission and the California Board of Forestry.

Pardee remained publicly active, returning to his native Oakland to become a co-founder of the state Bull Moose Party in 1912. In 1920, he was invited to become Commodore of the Oakland Yacht Club, a position he would enjoy again from 1925 to 1928. In the years following his governorship, Pardee lobbied intensely for a water district specifically for the East Bay. In 1921, the legislature passed the Municipal Utility District Act, and two years later, the East Bay Municipal Utility District (EBMUD) was organized. Pardee would administer EBMUD from 1924 until shortly before his death in 1941.

In 1927, Oakland citizens awarded Pardee as a founding commissioner to the Port of Oakland due to his lengthy battle to remove the Southern Pacific monopoly over the waterfront.

Pardee died in Oakland on September 1, 1941, at the age of 84.

== Family ==
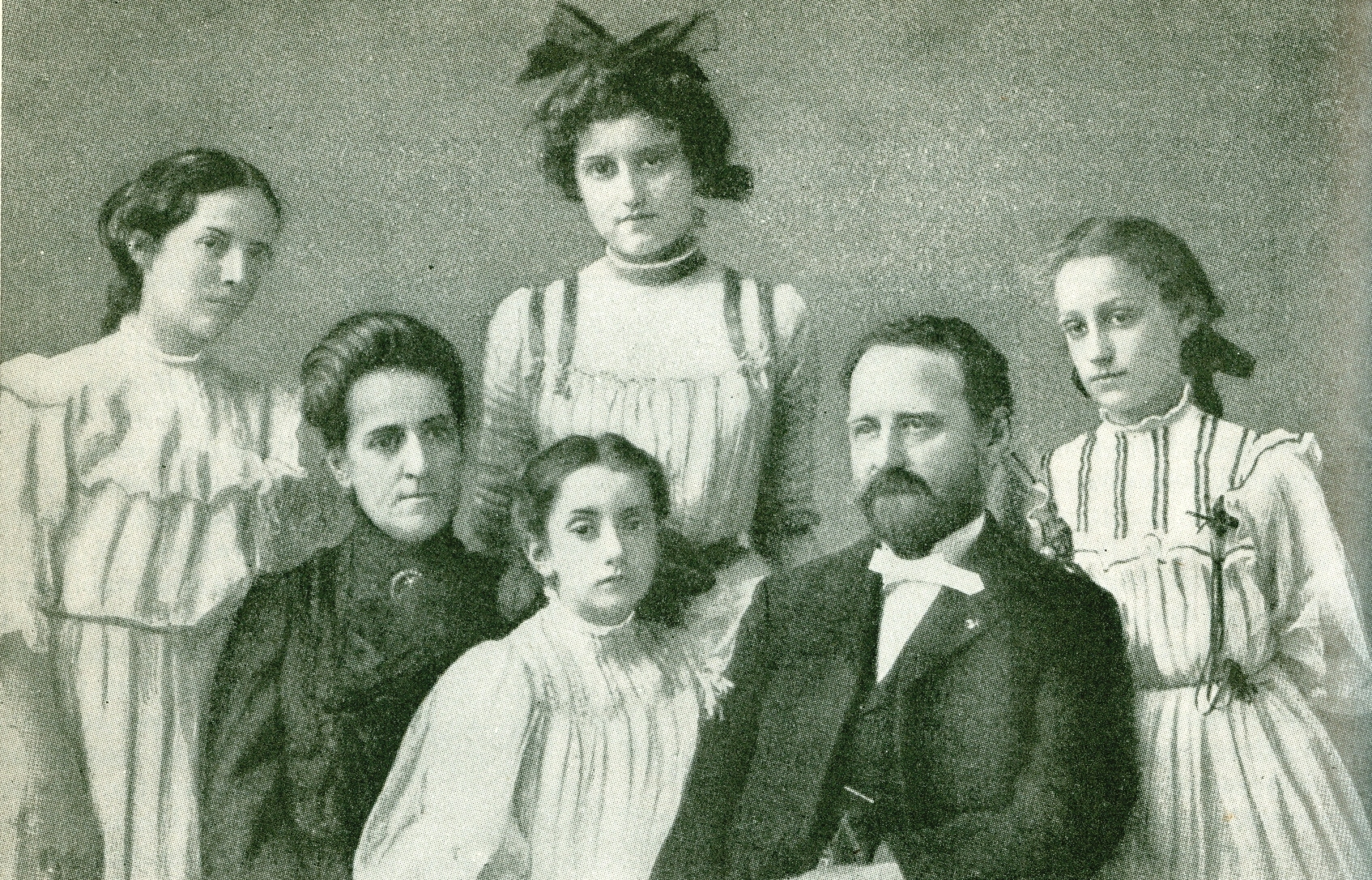
The Pardee family c. 1902

Pardee met his future wife, Helen Newhall Penniman, at Oakland High School in the 1870s, graduating together in 1875. Helen was a school teacher, photographer, and art collector.

The Pardees had four daughters, Florence, Caroline, Madeline and Helen. Florence Pardee was killed in a car accident in 1910. Caroline Pardee died from the Spanish flu in 1920. Surviving daughters Madeline and Helen would continue to own and live in the family's Pardee Home until Helen Pardee's death in 1981. The Pardee Home opened as a public museum in 1991.

== Legacy ==
Unlike his predecessor Henry Gage and his successor James Gillett, Pardee's governorship has been generally well regarded amongst historians. His efforts of conservation and education have proved to be long standing, such as the creations of bodies that would later become UC Davis and the California Department of Forestry and Fire Protection. Despite their initial support of his nomination in 1902, Pardee's near-constant resistance to the Southern Pacific Railroad has spared his reputation of criticism for being too close to rail monopolies. State historians from the California Secretary of State's office wrote that between Gage, Pardee and Gillett, "only Pardee can be considered an honest earnest administrator."

Environmental historian Philip L. Fradkin has cited Pardee as one of the unsung heroes of the 1906 San Francisco earthquake. "Pardee lacked a glamorous frontline role, and he was criticized for not dashing in the flame-licked streets. With a large staff imported from Sacramento, the governor was the expediter of paper; in every great disaster there needs to be at least one such competent bureaucrat."

Pardee was also the first governor to reside in the California Governor's Mansion. The mansion would continue to be lived in by the state executive until the governorship of Ronald Reagan.

The Pardee Home, located in downtown Oakland, remains a tourist attraction in the center of the city, hosting tours and speaking events.

The Pardee Dam and the adjacent Pardee Reservoir along the Mokelumne River are named after the governor.

The old Governor's Office within the California State Capitol is refurbished to appear as it did during the time of George Pardee's governorship in 1906.

== See also ==
- National Irrigation Congress

Party political offices
Preceded by Henry Gage	Republican nominee for Governor of California; 1902	Succeeded by James Gillett
Political offices
Preceded by Melvin C. Chapman	Mayor of Oakland; March 13, 1893 – March 10, 1895	Succeeded by John L. Davie
Preceded by Henry Gage	Governor of California; 1903–1907	Succeeded by James Gillett
