= Eagle Peak (Mariposa County, California) =

Mountain in Yosemite National Park, California

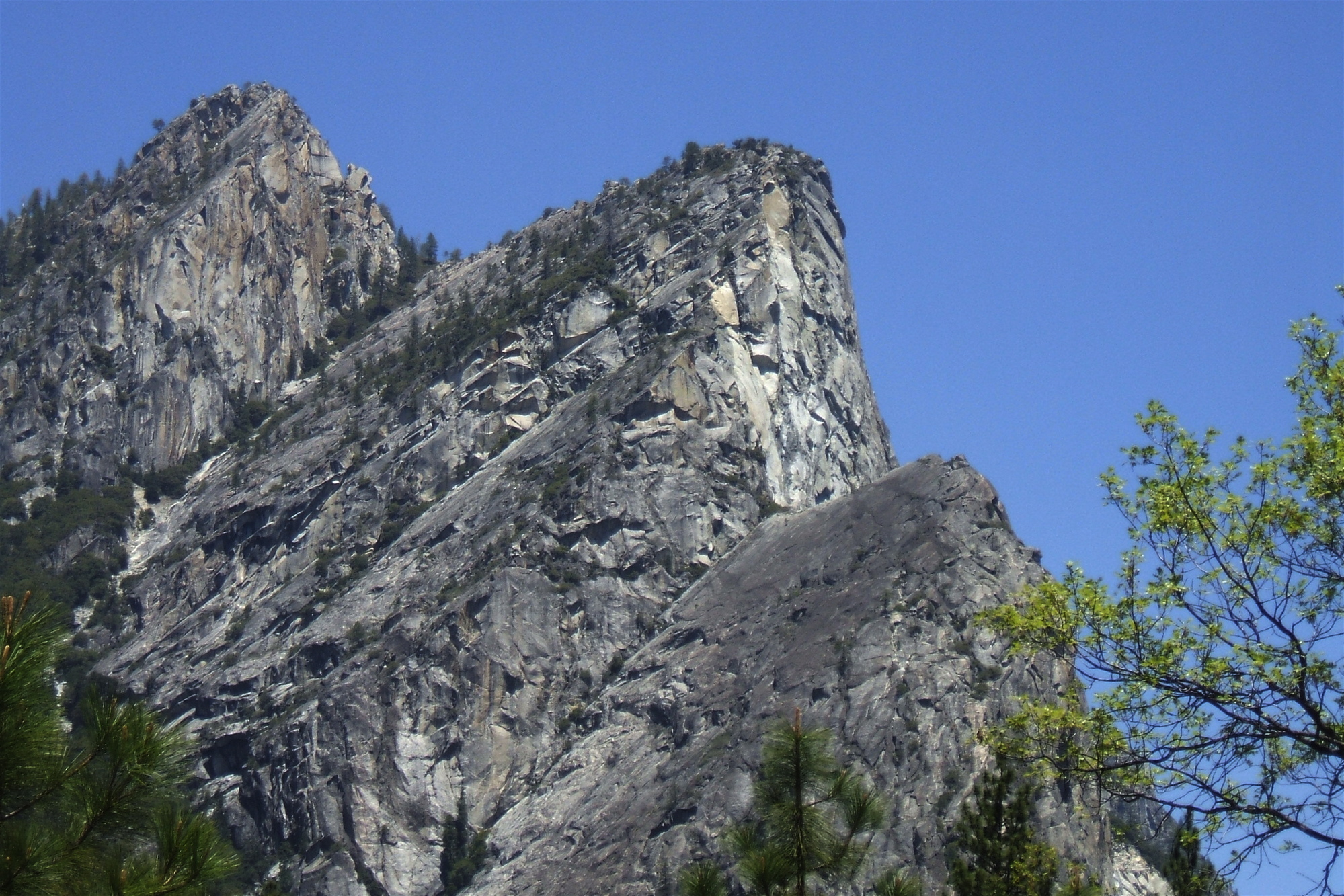
- Three Brothers as seen from Valley Loop trail

Highest point
- Elevation: 7,783 ft (2,372 m) NAVD 88
- Prominence: 379 ft (116 m)
- Coordinates: 37°44′46″N 119°36′53″W

Geography
- Location within California Location within the United States
- Location: Yosemite National Park, Mariposa County, California, U.S.
- Parent range: Sierra Nevada
- Topo map: USGS Half Dome

Geology
- Rock age: Cretaceous
- Mountain type: granite rock

Climbing
- Easiest route: Scramble, class 2

Eagle Peak is the highest of the Three Brothers, a rock formation, above Yosemite Valley in California. This independent peak is located just east of El Capitan. John Muir considered the view from the summit to be "most comprehensive of all the views" available from the north wall.

== Recreation ==
Eagle Peak can be reached by following the Upper Yosemite Falls and Eagle Peak trails. The hike is 6.0 miles (9.7 km) one way with a climb of over 3,500 feet (1,100 m). The trailhead is at Camp 4 near Yosemite Village. It passes near Yosemite Falls and affords many views of the valley.

The peak can also be reached form the Tamarack Flat Campground located off the Tioga Pass Road. The hike, which follows the El Capitan trail most of the way, is 7.7 miles (12.4 km) but the trailhead is at about 6,400 feet (2,000 m). Another route starts at Yosemite Creek Campground at an elevation of 7,200 feet (2,200 m). This trailhead is at the end of a very rough, single lane, 4-mile (6.4 km) road.

== See also ==
- Three Brothers (Yosemite)
