= Three Brothers (Yosemite) =

Rock formation in California, United States

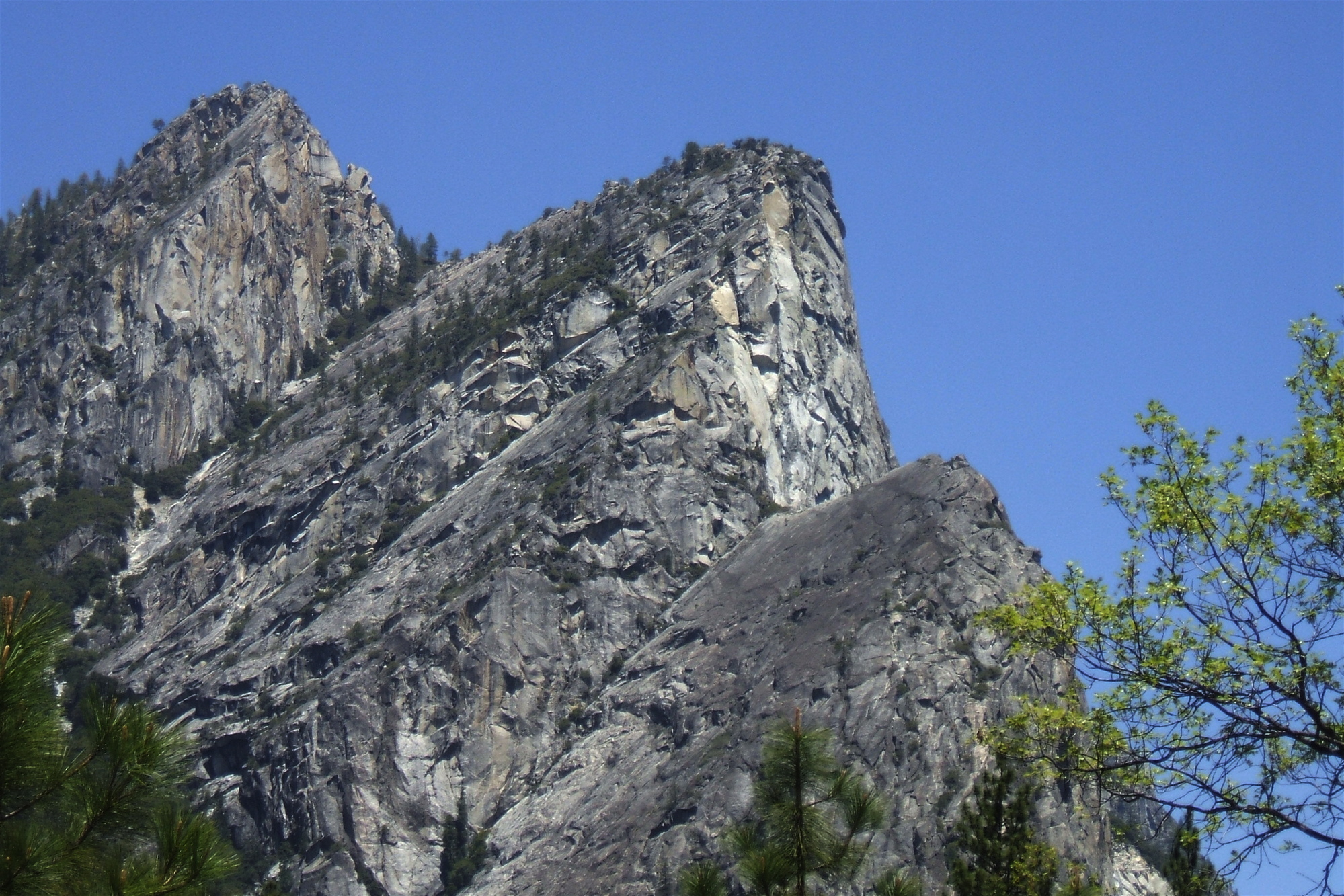
- Three Brothers as seen from Valley Loop trail

Highest point
- Elevation: 7,783 ft (2,372 m) NAVD 88
- Prominence: 379 ft (116 m)
- Coordinates: 37°44′46″N 119°36′53″W

Geography
- Location within California Location within the United States
- Location: Yosemite National Park, Mariposa County, California, United States
- Parent range: Sierra Nevada
- Topo map: USGS Half Dome

Geology
- Rock age: Cretaceous
- Mountain type: granite rock

The Three Brothers is a rock formation in Yosemite Valley, California. It is located just east of El Capitan and consists of Eagle Peak (the uppermost "brother"), and Middle and Lower Brothers.

== The name Three Brothers ==
Members of the Mariposa Battalion named the Three Brothers after the capture of the three sons of Chief Tenaya near the base of the Three Brothers.

== Their original name ==
The Ahwahnechee name was "Kom-po-pai-zes", or sometimes "Pompomposus", is translated as "mountains with heads like frogs when ready to leap".

== John Muir ==
John Muir considered the view from Eagle Peak to be the most beautiful view of Yosemite Valley available.
