= James Gillett =

American lawyer and politician (1860–1937)

James Norris Gillett
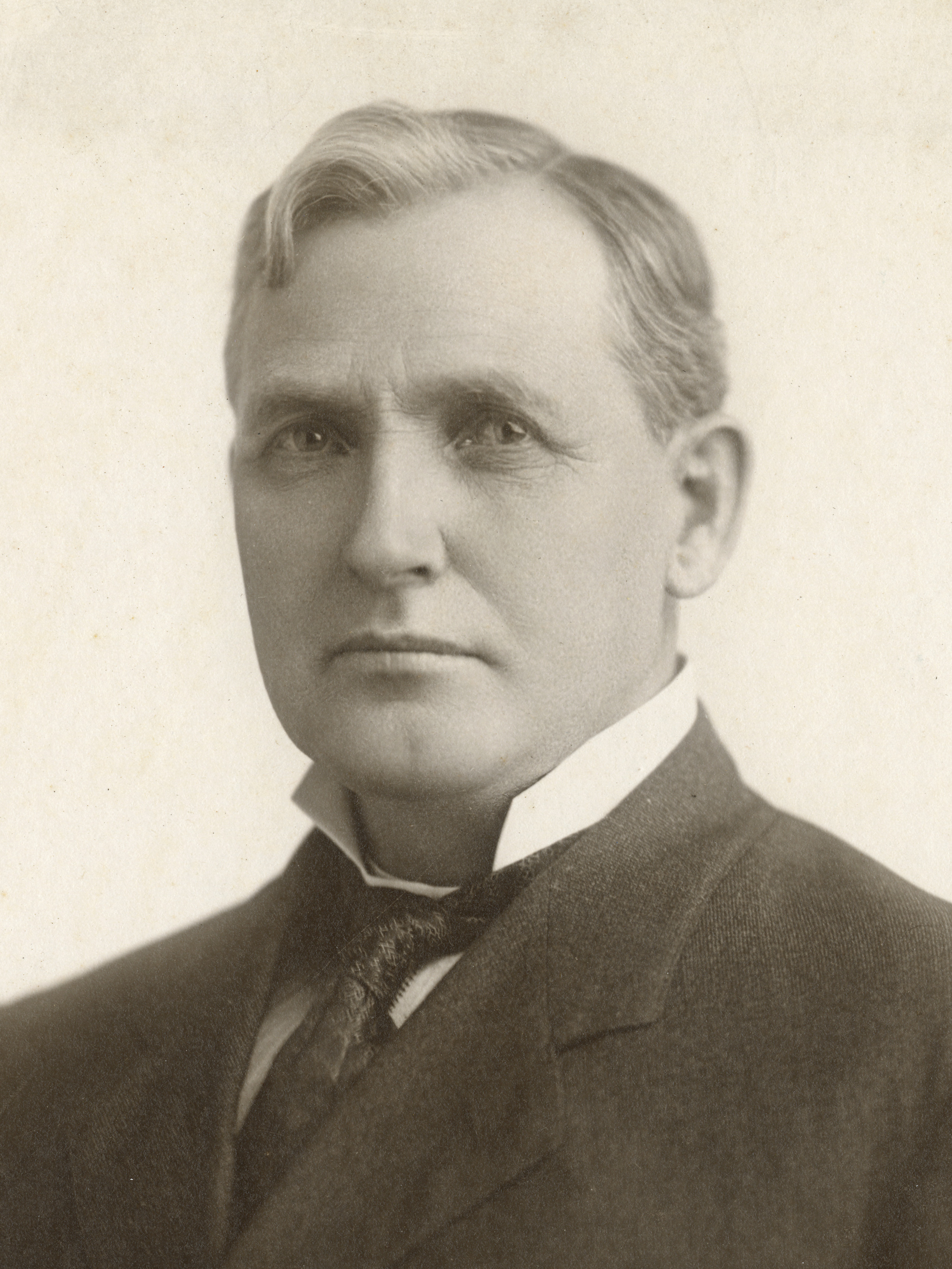
- Gillett in 1907

22nd Governor of California
- In office January 9, 1907 – January 3, 1911
- Lieutenant: Warren R. Porter
- Preceded by: George Pardee
- Succeeded by: Hiram Johnson

Member of the U.S. House of Representatives from California's 1st district
- In office March 4, 1903 – November 4, 1906
- Preceded by: Frank Coombs
- Succeeded by: William F. Englebright

Member of the California Senate from the 1st district
- In office January 4, 1897 – January 1, 1901
- Preceded by: Frank McGowan
- Succeeded by: Thomas H. Selvage

Personal details
- Born: September 20, 1860 Viroqua, Wisconsin, U.S.
- Died: April 20, 1937 (aged 76) Berkeley, California, U.S.
- Party: Republican
- Spouse(s): Adelaide Pratt, Isabella Erzgraber
- Children: 7
- Profession: Lawyer, politician

James Norris Gillett (September 20, 1860 – April 20, 1937) was an American lawyer and politician. A Republican involved in federal and state politics, Gillett was elected both a member of the U.S. House of Representatives from California from March 4, 1903, to November 4, 1906, and as the 22nd governor of California from January 9, 1907, to January 3, 1911.

== Early life and education ==
James Gillett was born in Viroqua, Wisconsin, on September 20, 1860. As a young child, Gillett moved with his parents to Sparta, Wisconsin, at the age of five. He remained in Sparta for nearly fifteen years, attending the town's grammar and high school. In 1881, Gillett was admitted to the Wisconsin Bar and began a law practice in Sparta shortly afterwards. In the early 1880s, Gillett permanently relocated out of his native Wisconsin for the West, living briefly in both the Montana Territory and Washington Territory before moving to California. He settled in Eureka in 1884.

== Early political career ==
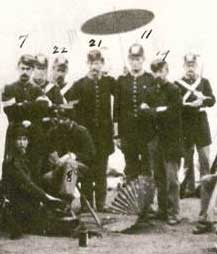
Private Gillett (marked by "11") while serving in the Eureka Guards in Santa Cruz in August 1885

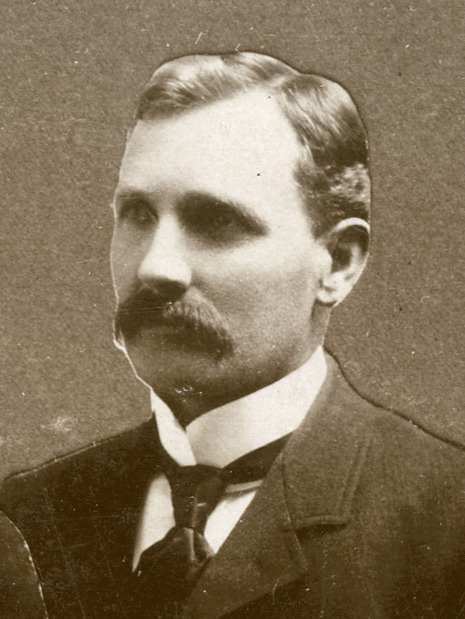
Gillett's official State Senate portrait, 1899

Once in Eureka, Gillett joined the state militia as a private in the Eureka Guard Company in 1885. Based primarily in Santa Cruz, Gillett's unit would be called into active military service only once, assisting Humboldt County sheriffs in protecting a local town jail during the height of Sinophobic riots in Eureka. Ironically, Gillett was himself active in the city's anti-Chinese movement. Following the end of his state military service, Gillett quickly resumed his career as a lawyer. In 1890, Gillett became the Eureka City Attorney, holding the position until 1895.

By the mid-1890s, Gillett had become interested in state politics. Running as a Republican, Gillett was elected to the California State Senate in 1896. After serving a single term in the State Senate, Gillett successfully ran for the U.S. House of Representatives in 1902. He successfully defended his seat in 1904.

Gillett's success in Washington was noticed by state Republicans and lobbyists for the Southern Pacific Railroad, who saw Gillett's politics as supporting their own corporate interests. Attending the state Republican convention in Santa Cruz in 1906, political boss Abe Ruef sought to replace incumbent Governor George Pardee with Gillett for the Republican gubernatorial nomination. Pardee, a physician and staunch Progressive and conservationist politician, openly opposed the Southern Pacific's monopoly over cargo and transportation, believing its business influence harmful to the state's economy and politics. In backroom deals, Southern Pacific lobbyists, including Ruef and Southern Pacific political bureau chief William Herrin, persuaded the attending Republican delegates to refuse Pardee renomination, instead handing the nomination to the railroad-friendly Gillett. In response to their support, Gillett promised the Southern Pacific waterfront patronage.

A photograph of Gillett and other Republican Party leaders at the home of Major Frank McLaughlin, published in The San Francisco Call, September 10, 1906. The photograph, with Gillett's hand on the shoulder of San Francisco political boss Abe Ruef, came to be known as "The Shame of California." Left to right: Frederick W. Henshaw, Rudolph Herold, James Wilfred McKinley, George Hatton, James Gillett, Abe Ruef, Frank McLaughlin, Walter F. Parker, Warren R. Porter, Frank Henry Kerrigan, Joseph R. Knowland.

The denying of Pardee's renomination caused immediate controversy and outrage. Pardee, due to his efficient bureaucracy and direction of the state government's response to the 1906 San Francisco earthquake, remained an enormously popular politician. His replacement by Gillett, a Railroad Republican, caused anger both in the press and within political circles. At the end of the convention, The San Francisco Call printed a photograph of Gillett among top leaders of the party and the Southern Pacific, with his hand on the shoulder of San Francisco political boss Abe Ruef, that later came to be known as "Herrin's Cabinet" and "The Shame of California." Gillett's nomination by special interests would fuel calls for a direct primary law in the state.

Despite his highly controversial nomination, Gillett would win the governorship in the 1906 general election, defeating Democrat Theodore A. Bell, Socialist Austin Lewis, Prohibitionist James H. Blanchard, and William Langdon of the Independence League. Langdon's strong third-place showing of 14.4% sapped votes away from both the popular contenders Gillett and Bell, yet enough to tip the balance in Gillett's favor.

Apparently confident of victory in the governor's race, Gillett resigned his U.S. House seat two days before the election.

== Governorship ==
Inaugurated on January 9, 1907, as the 22nd governor of California, Gillett's agenda included the construction of more transcontinental railroads between California and the East. In addition, Gillett, like his predecessor Pardee, encouraged the California State Legislature to debate the direct primary, though remained vague on his support for any such law. Gillett also included within his agenda the expansion of harbors, especially in the case of the Port of San Francisco following the 1906 firestorm, to keep up with the state's expanding commerce and ongoing population boom. Gillett also pushed bills through the Legislature to create state measures assisting federal food safety laws, particularly for the expanding fruit and California wine industries.

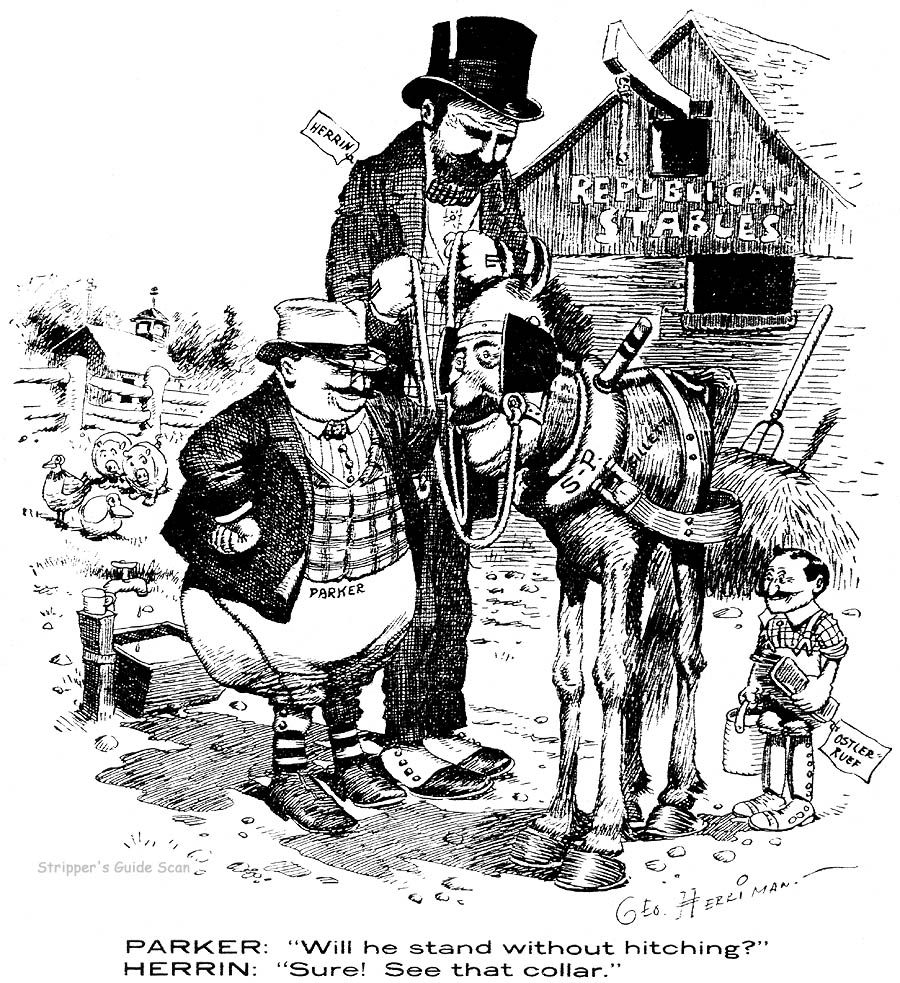
A George Herriman cartoon featuring Gillett as a mule surrounded by prominent Southern Pacific lobbyists in 1906. Herriman frequently depicted Gillett as a mule.

During his governorship, Gillett encouraged and signed laws to reform state parole guidelines, assisting prisoners to more quickly reform themselves and return as productive members of society. In 1907, he signed landmark amendments to the state's Poison Act prohibiting the sale of opium and cocaine except by a doctor's prescription, setting the stage for the state Board of Pharmacy to launch an aggressive crackdown on narcotics and Chinese smoking opium seven years before the Harrison Act. In 1909, Gillett passed the state's first eugenics law, making it legal for state officials to sterilize mental patients considered clinically insane, prisoners exhibiting sexual or moral perversions, and anyone with more than three criminal convictions. The law was passed unanimously in the Assembly, and had one dissenting vote in the Senate. Some 19,000 people were sterilized between 1909 and 1950, when eugenics became generally disfavored by the medical profession due to its connections with Nazi Germany.

As automobiles became more common along California's roads, Gillett agreed with the Legislature to pass the State Highway Bond Act of 1909. The act, which created a bond worth $18 million, effectively established the California state highway system. The system would collectively organize state roads, numbering them sequentially, and provide greater funds for maintenance and expansion.

Gillett's governorship, however, remained continually marred with controversy due to his Republican nomination by party machine business interests. Writing in the Los Angeles Examiner, influential cartoonist George Herriman continually depicted Governor Gillett as a mule for Southern Pacific interests. Indeed, while in office, Gillett appealed to the railroads to not levy excessive charges on shipping companies and municipalities, yet still warmly welcomed their economic and political presence in the state. His warm relations with the Southern Pacific led in part to rising Progressive anger within state Republican ranks, culminating in the election of Hiram Johnson and a large number of like-minded Progressive state legislators in the 1910 elections.

By 1910, Gillett was falling quickly into financial trouble, and decided not to seek re-election. Privately, however, it is believed that his wife, Isabella, did not want Gillett to continue in the governorship.

== Post governorship ==
Following his departure from the governor's office, Gillett opened a law practice in San Francisco. As of July 1911, he was acting as attorney for the Sierra Blue Lakes Water & Power Company alongside former attorney general William H. H. Hart. From 1916 to 1920, Gillett worked in Washington, D.C., as an attorney and lobbyist for the San Francisco-based Associated Oil Company and the Oil Industry Association. Gillett's lobbying in the U.S. Congress helped secure passage of the Oil Leasing Bill in 1920, which pertained to leases in the naval petroleum reserves. He would go on to represent many oil industry companies and individuals in oil lease matters. Throughout the 1920s Gillett completed over twenty years' work in obtaining compensation for the owners and crews of sailing vessels seized by the U.S. federal government in the Bering Sea between 1886 and 1894.

Gillett retired from his law practice in 1929, only to begin a new practice in 1934 in Oakland with his son, James Gillett Jr.

He died April 20, 1937, in Berkeley, at the age of 76.

Political offices
Preceded by George Pardee	Governor of California; 1907–1911	Succeeded by Hiram Johnson
U.S. House of Representatives
Preceded by Frank L. Coombs	Member of the U.S. House of Representatives from California's 1st district March 4, 1903 – November 4, 1906	Succeeded by William F. Englebright
Party political offices
Preceded by George Pardee	Republican nominee for Governor of California; 1906	Succeeded by Hiram Johnson
