= Governor of California =

Head of government of the U.S. state of California

- Seal of the governor of California

- Flag of the governor

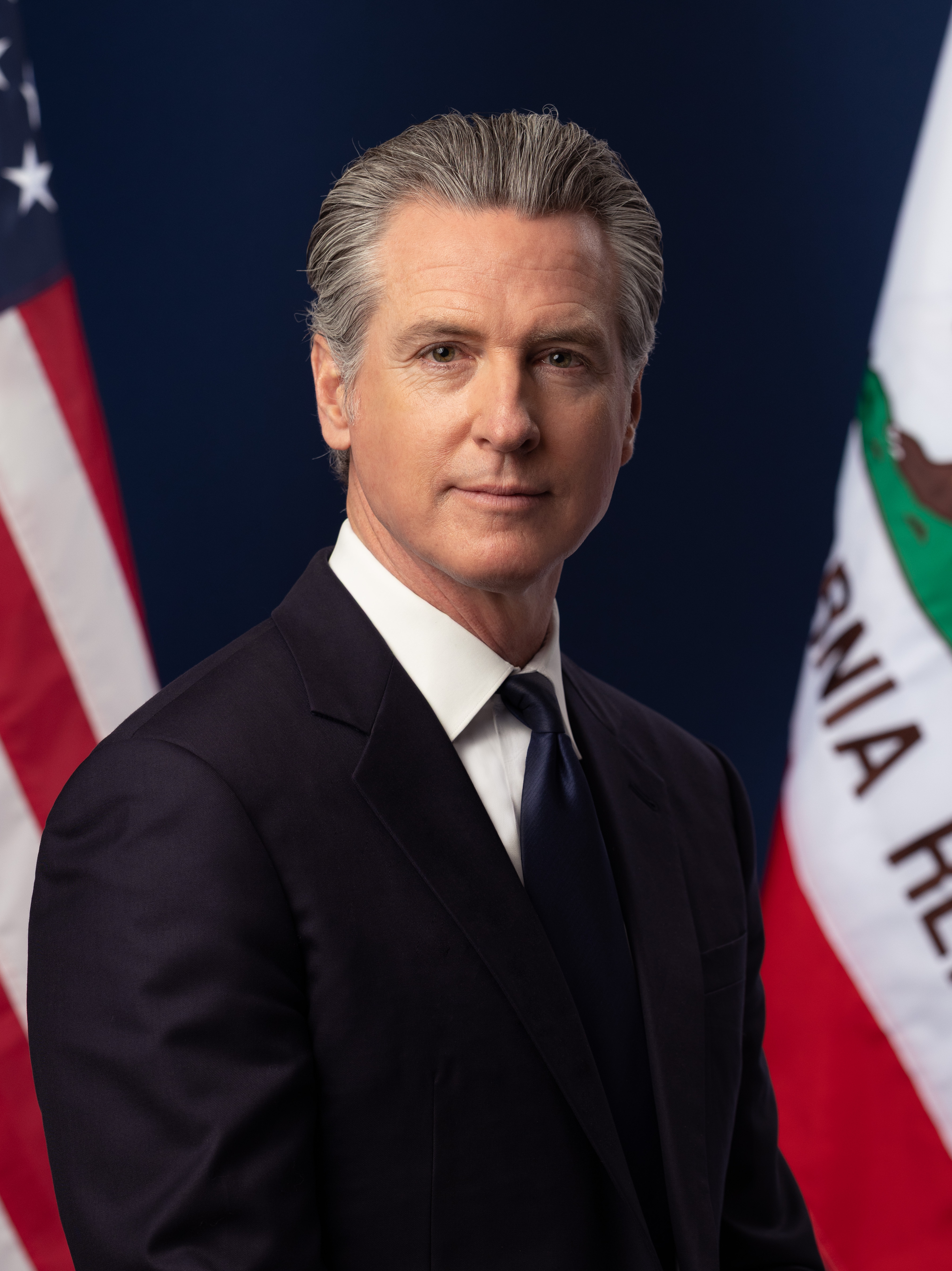
- Incumbent; Gavin Newsom since January 7, 2019
- Executive branch of the government of California
- Type: Chief executive; Head of government; Commander-in-chief
- Member of: Cabinet; Regents of the University of California
- Residence: Governor's Mansion
- Seat: California State Capitol (principal workplace); Stanford Mansion (workplace and reception center)
- Nominator: Political parties
- Appointer: Popular vote
- Term length: 4 years, renewable once
- Constituting instrument: Constitution of California
- Precursor: Governor of the Californias (New Spain); Governor of Alta California (Mexico)
- Inaugural holder: Peter Hardeman Burnett
- Formation: December 20, 1849 (177 years ago)
- Succession: Line of succession
- Deputy: Lieutenant Governor of California
- Salary: US$224,020 (2022)
- Website: Official website

The governor of California is the head of government of the U.S. state of California. The governor is the commander-in-chief of the California National Guard and the California State Guard.

Established in the Constitution of California, the governor's responsibilities also include submitting the budget, ensuring that state laws are enforced, and making the annual State of the State address to the California State Legislature. The position was created in 1849, the year before California became a state.

The governor is now limited to two terms, regardless of whether they are consecutive. The current governor of California is Democrat Gavin Newsom, who was inaugurated on January 7, 2019 and whose second term ends on January 1, 2027. Jerry Brown was the longest serving governor in Californian history, serving from 1975 until 1983, and again from 2011 until 2019.

== Responsibilities ==
Article 5 of the State Constitution lists the Powers & Responsibilities of the Office of Governor of California:

- Chief Executive of the State
- Ensures State Laws are faithfully enforced & executed
- Supreme Authority over State Agencies & Departments
- Appoints Officials to State Agencies, Boards & commissions
- Appoints state judges to vacant judicial seats
- Commander-In-Chief of the California National Guard (when not federalized) & California State Guard
- Can sign bills into law
- Can veto bills entirely (override by 2/3 majority in Legislature)
- Use a line-item veto on budget bills
- Prepares & submits the statement budget every year
- Has Authority to approve or reject funding levels for government programs
- Convene the State Legislature if needed
- Deliver the State of the State Address to the State Legislature every year
- Can grant pardons, commute sentences or issue reprieves (cannot grant clemency involving impeachment, requires California Supreme Court approval)
- If a U.S. Senate seat become vacant due to death or resignation, the Governor can appoint a replacement
- Can use the “Bully Pulpit" to influence Public Opinion or Legislative Priorities

== Gubernatorial elections, oath, and term of office ==
=== Qualifications ===
A candidate for governor must be a U.S. citizen and a registered voter within the state, must not have been convicted of a felony involving bribery, embezzlement, or extortion, and must not have served two terms since November 6, 1990.

=== Election and oath of office ===
Governors are elected by popular ballot following a nonpartisan primary and serve terms of four years, with a limit of two terms, if served after November 6, 1990. Governors take the following oath:

I (Governor) do solemnly swear that I will support and defend the Constitution of the United States and the Constitution of the State of California against all enemies foreign and domestic, that I will bear true faith and allegiance to the Constitution of the United States and the Constitution of the State of California, that I take this obligation freely without any mental reservation or purpose of evasion and that I will well and faithfully discharge the duties upon which I am about to enter.

Governors take office on the first Monday after January 1 after their election.

=== Gubernatorial removal ===
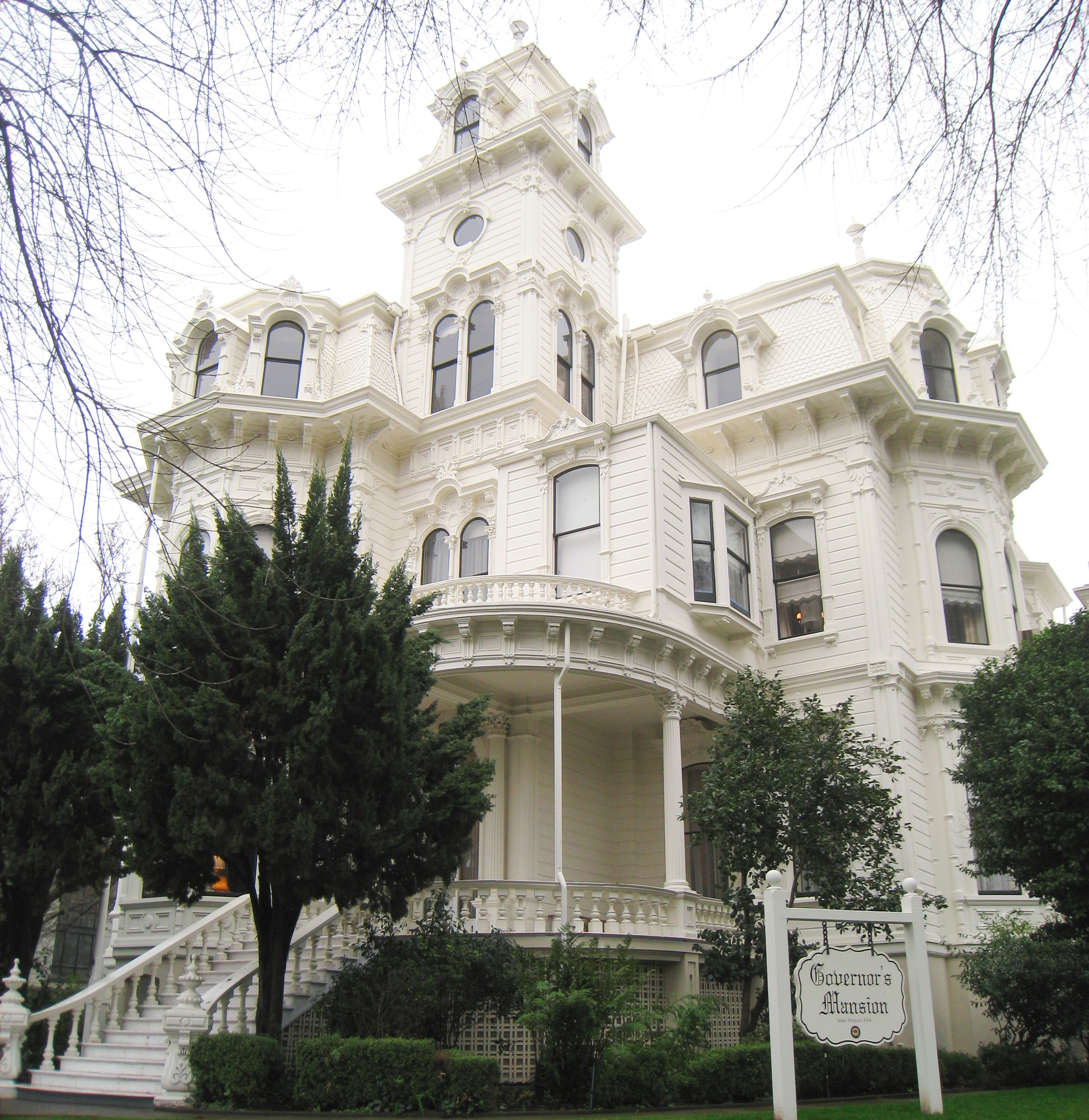
The California Governor's Mansion, official residence of the governor

Two methods exist to remove a governor.

==== Impeachment and removal by the legislature ====
The governor can be impeached for "misconduct in office" by a majority vote of the State Assembly and removed by a two-thirds supermajority vote of the State Senate.

==== Recall by the voters ====
Petitions signed by California state voters equal to 12% of the last vote for the office of governor (with signatures from each of five counties equal to 1% of the last vote for governor in the county) can launch a gubernatorial recall election. The voters can then vote on whether or not to recall the incumbent governor, and on the same ballot can vote for a potential replacement. If a majority of the voters in the election vote to recall the governor, then the person who gains a plurality of the votes in the replacement race will become governor.

Only two governor recall attempts have ever gained enough signatures to make the ballot in California. The 2003 recall election began with a petition drive that forced Democratic governor Gray Davis into a recall election, which he lost. He was replaced by Republican Arnold Schwarzenegger. It was the first time that a California governor was voted out of office by Recall.

In addition to the successful 2003 recall, current governor Gavin Newsom faced a recall election in 2021, which he defeated.

== Relationship with the lieutenant governor ==
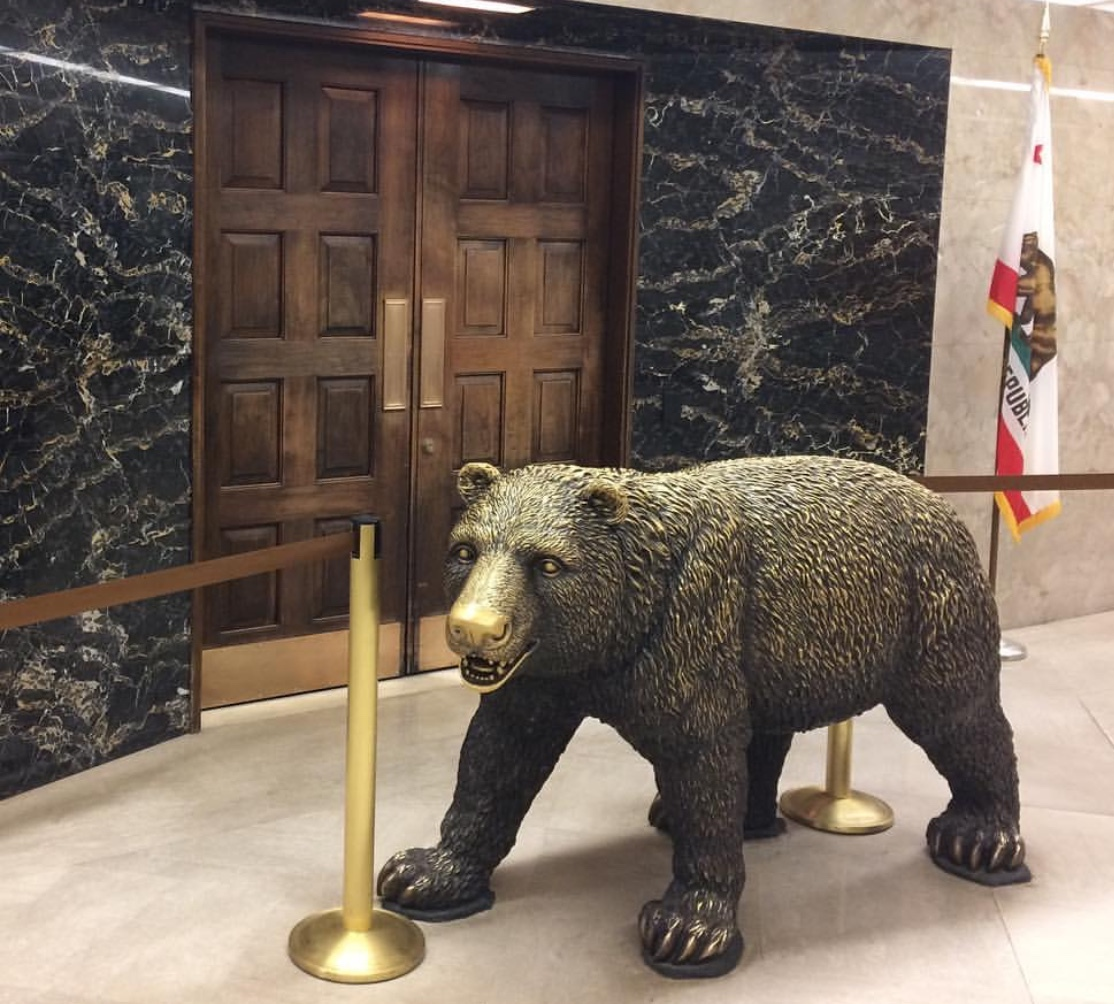
Bronze statue of a California grizzly bear outside the governor's office, in the California State Capitol

The lieutenant governor of California is separately elected during the same election, not jointly as the running mate of the gubernatorial candidate. As such, California had governors and lieutenant governors of different parties for nearly 27 of the 33 years between 1978 and 2011, whereas previously, this had only occurred in 1875, 1887, 1895 and 1916–1917 due to the resignation or death of an incumbent governor or lieutenant governor.

This occasionally becomes significant, since the California Constitution provides that all the powers of the governor fall to the lieutenant governor whenever the governor is not in the state of California, with the lieutenant governor sometimes signing or vetoing legislation or making political appointments whenever the governor leaves the state.

In practice, there is a gentlemen's agreement for the lieutenant governor not to perform more than perfunctory duties while the governor is away from the state: This agreement was violated when Mike Curb was in office, as from 1979 to 1983 he signed several executive orders at odds with the Brown administration when Brown was out of the state. Court rulings have upheld the lieutenant governor's right to perform the duties and assume all of the prerogatives of governor while the governor is out of the state.

The lieutenant governor is also the president of the California State Senate.

== Official residence and workplace ==
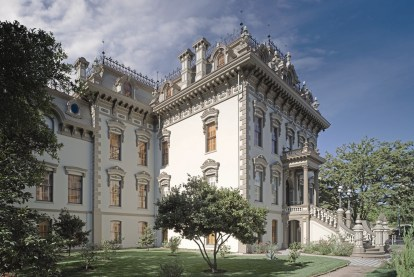
Stanford Mansion is the official reception center for the California government and one of the official workplaces for the governor.

The official residence of the California governor is the California Governor's Mansion, in Sacramento. The mansion has served as the residence of 14 governors, while others have declined to reside in the mansion, preferring private residential arrangements. It is also one of the official workplaces for the governor.

The governor's primary official workplace is located within the California State Capitol in Sacramento.

The Stanford Mansion, in Sacramento, serves as one of the official workplaces for the governor, as well as the official reception center for the California government.

== Timeline ==
Timeline of California governors

== See also ==
- List of governors of California
- List of governors of California before 1850
- List of governors of California by education
- Politics of California
- Politics of California before 1900
- First ladies and partners of California
- List of burial places of governors of California
