= 1890 California gubernatorial election =

- November 4, 1890
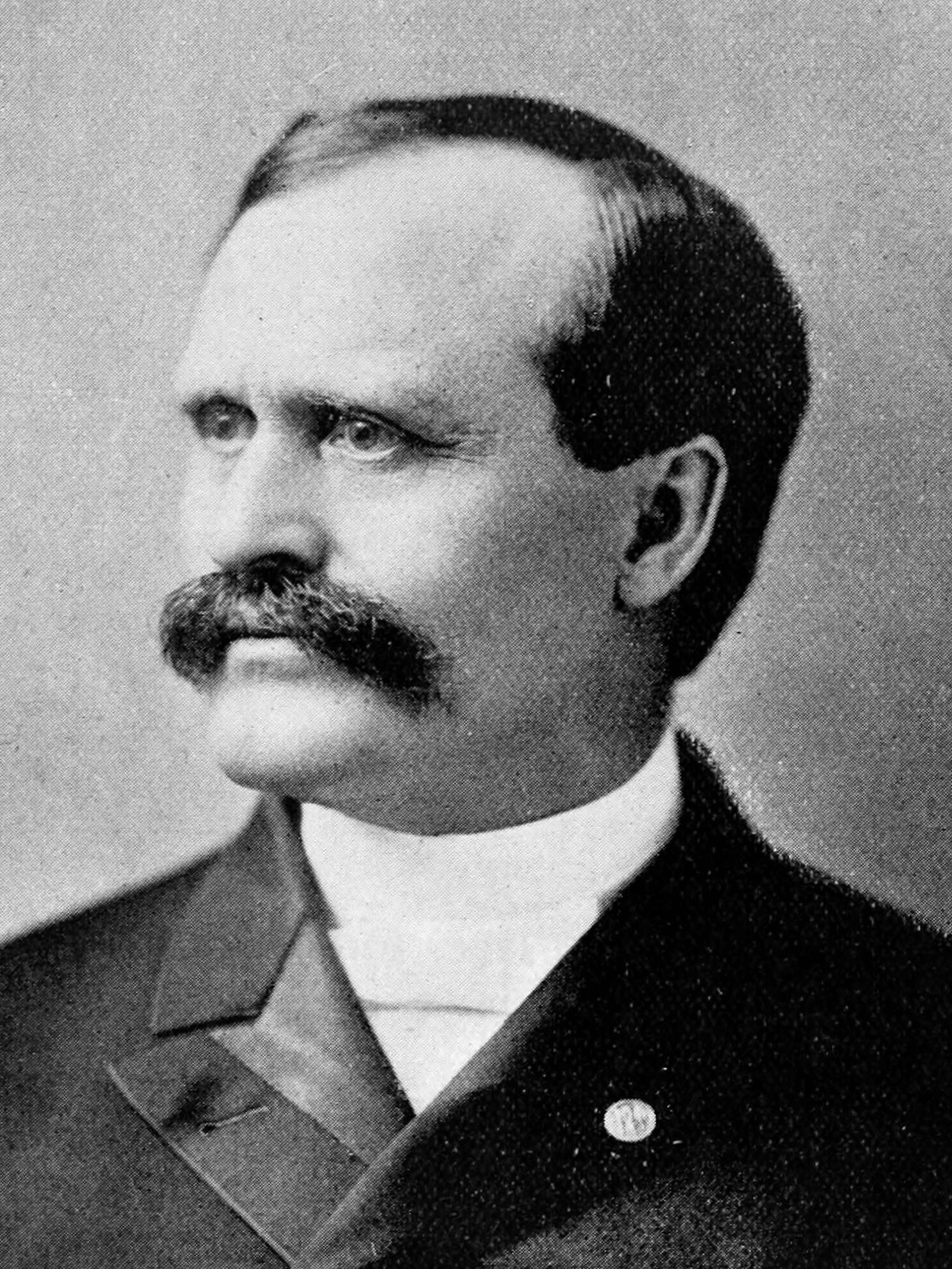

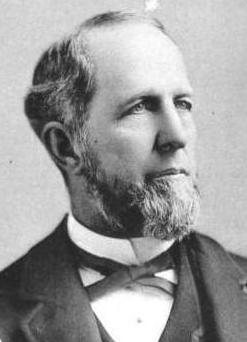
Nominee	Henry Markham	Edward B. Pond
Party	Republican	Democratic
Popular vote	125,129	117,184
Percentage	49.56%	46.42%
- County results Markham: 40–50% 50–60% 60–70% 70–80% Pond: 40–50% 50–60% 60–70%
Governor before election
Robert Waterman
Republican
Elected Governor
Henry Markham
Republican

The 1890 California gubernatorial election was held on November 4, 1890, to elect the governor of California. Incumbent governor Robert Waterman, who had succeeded Washington Bartlett after the latter's death only eight months into his term in 1887, declined to seek a full term due to his own health issues. Republican former Congressman Henry Markham defeated Democratic Mayor of San Francisco Edward B. Pond in a close race.

== Results ==
California gubernatorial election, 1890
Party	Candidate	Votes	%	±%
Republican	Henry Markham	125,129	49.56%	+6.46%
Democratic	Edward B. Pond	117,184	46.42%	+2.98%
Prohibition	John Bidwell	10,073	3.99%	+0.70%
	Scattering	71	0.03%	
Majority		7,945	3.15%	
Total votes		252,457	100.00%	
Republican hold		Swing	+3.48%	

=== Results by county ===
County	Henry Markham Republican		Edward B. Pond Democratic		John Bidwell Prohibition		Scattering Write-in		Margin		Total votes cast
County	#	%	#	%	#	%	#	%	#	%	Total votes cast
Alameda	9,333	55.92%	6,274	37.59%	1,080	6.47%	2	0.01%	3,059	18.33%	16,689
Alpine	56	74.67%	19	25.33%	0	0.00%	0	0.00%	37	49.33%	75
Amador	1,333	47.64%	1,345	48.07%	120	4.29%	0	0.00%	-12	-0.43%	2,798
Butte	2,060	46.10%	2,141	47.91%	268	6.00%	0	0.00%	-81	-1.81%	4,469
Calaveras	1,380	51.13%	1,278	47.35%	41	1.52%	0	0.00%	102	3.78%	2,699
Colusa	1,258	35.44%	2,243	63.18%	49	1.38%	0	0.00%	-985	-27.75%	3,550
Contra Costa	1,509	53.62%	1,202	42.71%	103	3.66%	0	0.00%	307	10.91%	2,814
Del Norte	220	34.00%	309	47.76%	118	18.24%	0	0.00%	-89	-13.76%	647
El Dorado	1,282	47.20%	1,371	50.48%	63	2.32%	0	0.00%	-89	-3.28%	2,716
Fresno	2,686	42.89%	3,298	52.66%	279	4.45%	0	0.00%	-612	-9.77%	6,263
Humboldt	2,410	48.87%	1,927	39.08%	594	12.05%	0	0.00%	483	9.80%	4,931
Inyo	469	57.26%	305	37.24%	45	5.49%	0	0.00%	164	20.02%	819
Kern	1,006	41.23%	1,361	55.78%	73	2.99%	0	0.00%	-355	-14.55%	2,440
Lake	678	43.94%	801	51.91%	64	4.15%	0	0.00%	-123	-7.97%	1,543
Lassen	491	46.85%	531	50.67%	26	2.48%	0	0.00%	-40	-3.82%	1,048
Los Angeles	10,272	51.08%	8,494	42.24%	1,338	6.65%	5	0.02%	1,778	8.84%	20,109
Marin	1,073	55.91%	820	42.73%	24	1.25%	2	0.10%	253	13.18%	1,919
Mariposa	452	41.97%	619	57.47%	6	0.56%	0	0.00%	-167	-15.51%	1,077
Mendocino	1,764	44.18%	2,021	50.61%	208	5.21%	0	0.00%	-257	-6.44%	3,993
Merced	838	44.20%	980	51.69%	78	4.11%	0	0.00%	-142	-7.49%	1,896
Modoc	484	42.23%	612	53.40%	50	4.36%	0	0.00%	-128	-11.17%	1,146
Mono	334	62.66%	173	32.46%	26	4.88%	0	0.00%	161	30.21%	533
Monterey	1,956	50.12%	1,834	46.99%	113	2.90%	0	0.00%	122	3.13%	3,903
Napa	1,877	55.06%	1,475	43.27%	57	1.67%	0	0.00%	402	11.79%	3,409
Nevada	2,060	50.05%	1,941	47.16%	115	2.79%	0	0.00%	119	2.89%	4,116
Orange	1,394	48.86%	1,189	41.68%	270	9.46%	0	0.00%	205	7.19%	2,853
Placer	1,793	49.19%	1,720	47.19%	132	3.62%	0	0.00%	73	2.00%	3,645
Plumas	640	54.47%	521	44.34%	14	1.19%	0	0.00%	119	10.13%	1,175
Sacramento	4,724	55.48%	3,635	42.69%	156	1.83%	0	0.00%	1,089	12.79%	8,515
San Benito	683	42.26%	850	52.60%	83	5.14%	0	0.00%	-167	-10.33%	1,616
San Bernardino	3,082	53.15%	2,290	39.49%	427	7.36%	0	0.00%	792	13.66%	5,799
San Diego	3,942	53.96%	2,967	40.61%	395	5.41%	2	0.03%	975	13.35%	7,306
San Francisco	27,218	49.20%	27,429	49.59%	619	1.12%	51	0.09%	-211	-0.38%	55,317
San Joaquin	3,066	48.73%	2,841	45.15%	385	6.12%	0	0.00%	225	3.58%	6,292
San Luis Obispo	1,719	50.28%	1,568	45.86%	132	3.86%	0	0.00%	151	4.42%	3,419
San Mateo	1,142	55.01%	912	43.93%	22	1.06%	0	0.00%	230	11.08%	2,076
Santa Barbara	1,763	49.77%	1,591	44.92%	188	5.31%	0	0.00%	172	4.86%	3,542
Santa Clara	4,505	48.98%	4,194	45.60%	497	5.40%	1	0.01%	311	3.38%	9,197
Santa Cruz	2,029	51.54%	1,666	42.32%	242	6.15%	0	0.00%	363	9.22%	3,937
Shasta	1,587	49.89%	1,459	45.87%	135	4.24%	0	0.00%	128	4.02%	3,181
Sierra	886	56.25%	674	42.79%	15	0.95%	0	0.00%	212	13.46%	1,575
Siskiyou	1,379	48.12%	1,393	48.60%	94	3.28%	0	0.00%	-14	-0.49%	2,866
Solano	2,527	54.01%	2,004	42.83%	146	3.12%	2	0.04%	523	11.18%	4,679
Sonoma	3,278	47.93%	3,289	48.09%	268	3.92%	4	0.06%	-11	-0.16%	6,839
Stanislaus	918	38.06%	1,363	56.51%	131	5.43%	0	0.00%	-445	-18.45%	2,412
Sutter	731	48.70%	722	48.10%	48	3.20%	0	0.00%	9	0.60%	1,501
Tehama	1,106	44.20%	1,330	53.16%	66	2.64%	0	0.00%	-224	-8.95%	2,502
Trinity	521	50.34%	502	48.50%	12	1.16%	0	0.00%	19	1.84%	1,035
Tulare	2,356	43.82%	2,705	50.32%	315	5.86%	0	0.00%	-349	-6.49%	5,376
Tuolumne	828	40.85%	1,137	56.09%	62	3.06%	0	0.00%	-309	-15.24%	2,027
Ventura	1,307 (Note: The 1891 Blue Book appears to contain a misprint for Markham in this county; it gives his vote in Ventura County as 1,207, but this causes his county figures to not add up to the correct statewide total. All other contemporary sources from the time such as newspapers and almanacs agree that 1,307 is the correct figure.)	54.16%	1,014	42.02%	91	3.77%	1	0.04%	293	12.14%	2,413
Yolo	1,481	45.58%	1,628	50.11%	139	4.28%	1	0.03%	-147	-4.52%	3,249
Yuba	1,243	49.50%	1,217	48.47%	51	2.03%	0	0.00%	26	1.04%	2,511
Total	125,129	49.56%	117,184	46.42%	10,073	3.99%	71	0.03%	7,945	3.15%	252,457

==== Counties that flipped from Democratic to Republican ====
- Monterey
- Napa
- San Bernardino
- San Joaquin
- Solano
- Trinity
- Yuba
