= Charles O'Donnell =

Charles O'Donnell may refer to:

- C. C. O'Donnell (1834–1912), American physician and politician
- Charles James O'Donnell (1849–1934), Irish colonial administrator and politician
- Charles L. O'Donnell (1884–1934), American priest and President of the University of Notre Dame
