= 1886 California gubernatorial election =

- November 2, 1886
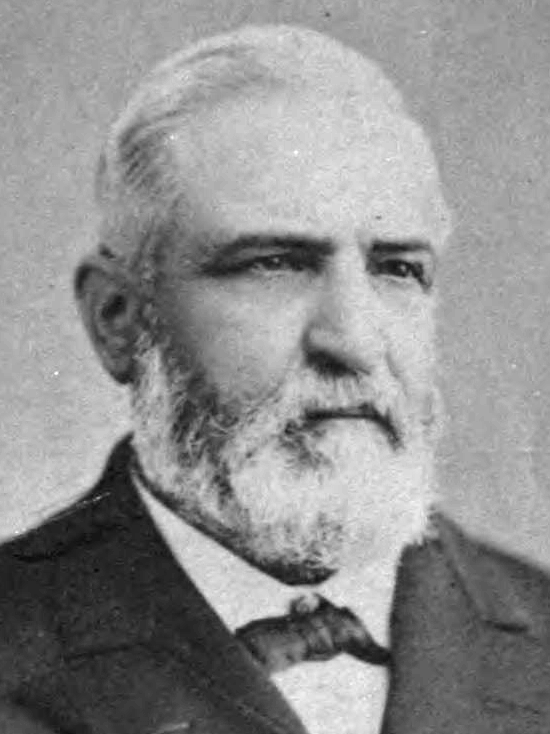

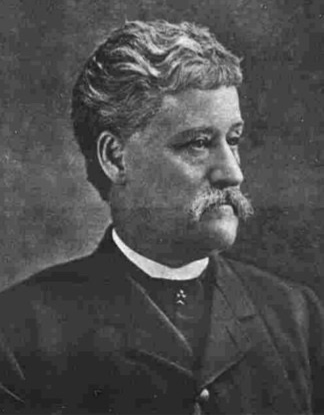

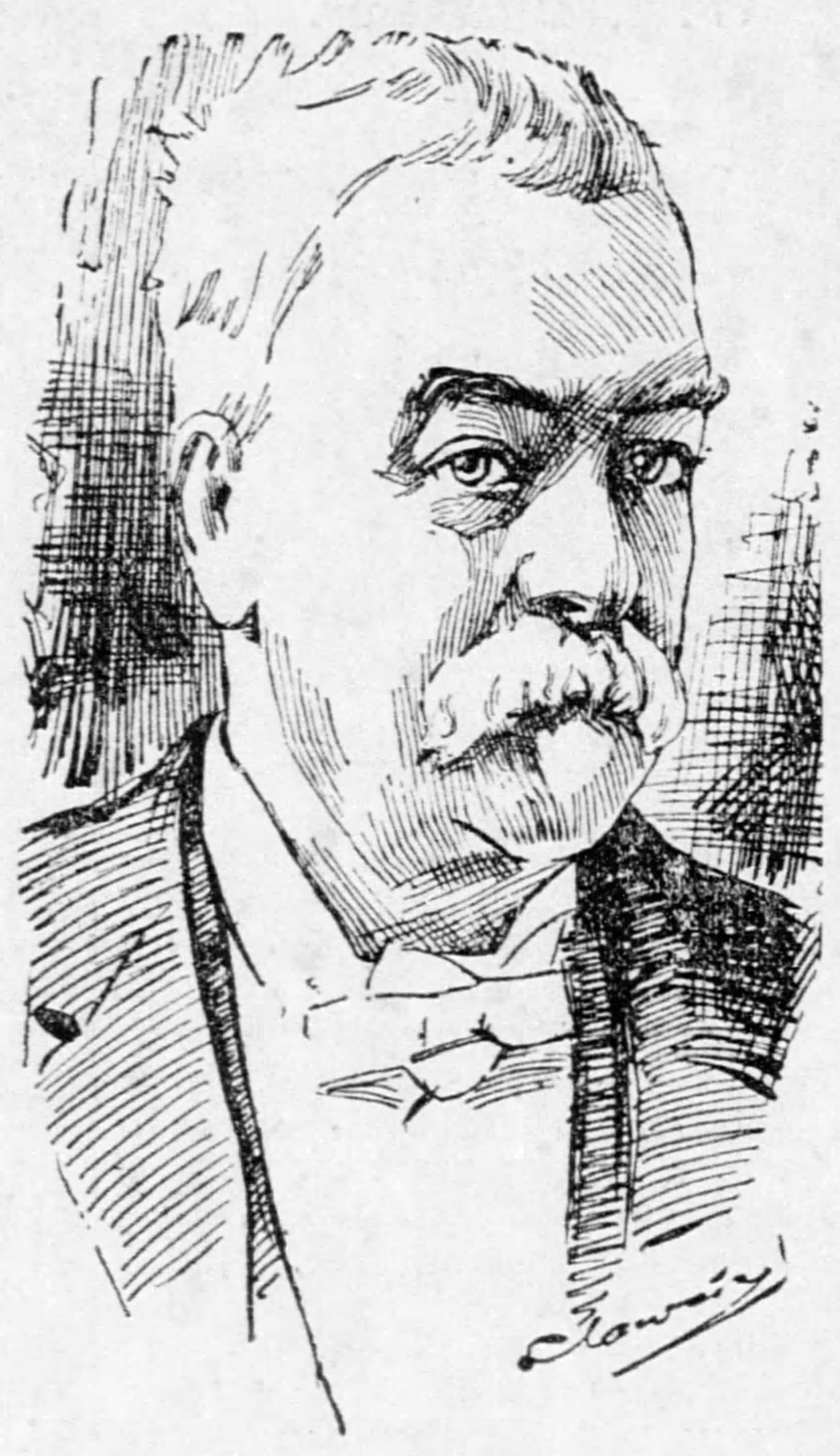
Nominee	Washington Bartlett	John Franklin Swift	Charles C. O'Donnell
Party	Democratic	Republican	Independent
Popular vote	84,970	84,316	12,227
Percentage	43.43%	43.10%	6.25%
- County results Bartlett: 30–40% 40–50% 50–60% 60–70% Swift: 40–50% 50–60% 70–80%
Governor before election
George Stoneman
Democratic
Elected Governor
Washington Bartlett
Democratic

The 1886 California gubernatorial election was held on November 2, 1886, to elect the governor of California. Washington Bartlett won a narrow plurality of the votes to become the state's 16th governor. For the first time since 1863, the incumbent party retained control of the governor's mansion.

Bartlett's term as governor would prove to be the second-shortest in the state's history: he died only eight months into his term on September 17, 1887. He was succeeded by Lieutenant Governor Robert Waterman, who had been elected at the same time as Bartlett.

== Results ==
California gubernatorial election, 1886
Party	Candidate	Votes	%	±%
Democratic	Washington Bartlett	84,970	43.43%	−11.64%
Republican	John Franklin Swift	84,316	43.10%	+2.31%
Independent	Charles C. O'Donnell	12,227	6.25%	
American Party	Peter D. Wigginton (Note: Wigginton's American Party is not the same as the Know Nothing Party of the 1850s, although its nativist ideology was similar to that of the Know Nothings)	7,347	3.76%	+3.76%
Prohibition	Joel Russell	6,432	3.29%	−0.22%
	Scattering	336	0.17%	
Majority		654	0.33%	
Total votes		195,628	100.00%	
Democratic hold		Swing	-13.95%	

=== Results by county ===
County	Washington Bartlett Democratic		John Franklin Swift Republican		Charles C. O'Donnell Independent		Peter D. Wigginton American		Joel Russell Prohibition		Scattering Write-in		Margin		Total votes cast
County	#	%	#	%	#	%	#	%	#	%	#	%	#	%	Total votes cast
Alameda	3,882	32.63%	5,514	46.34%	810	6.81%	1,407	11.83%	280	2.35%	5	0.04%	-1,632	-13.72%	11,898
Alpine	25	29.76%	59	70.24%	0	0.00%	0	0.00%	0	0.00%	0	0.00%	-34	-40.48%	84
Amador	1,375	49.23%	1,298	46.47%	9	0.32%	15	0.54%	95	3.40%	1	0.04%	77	2.76%	2,793
Butte	1,967	47.00%	1,935	46.24%	134	3.20%	49	1.17%	100	2.39%	0	0.00%	32	0.76%	4,185
Calaveras	1,231	48.97%	1,254	49.88%	5	0.20%	4	0.16%	18	0.72%	2	0.08%	-23	-0.91%	2,514
Colusa	1,702	62.37%	880	32.25%	50	1.83%	11	0.40%	86	3.15%	0	0.00%	822	30.12%	2,729
Contra Costa	1,147	43.86%	1,251	47.84%	37	1.41%	97	3.71%	83	3.17%	0	0.00%	-104	-3.98%	2,615
Del Norte	290	47.85%	244	40.26%	5	0.83%	24	3.96%	43	7.10%	0	0.00%	46	7.59%	606
El Dorado	1,403	50.40%	1,231	44.22%	28	1.01%	14	0.50%	106	3.81%	2	0.07%	172	6.18%	2,784
Fresno	1,740	52.13%	1,101	32.98%	64	1.92%	286	8.57%	147	4.40%	0	0.00%	639	19.14%	3,338
Humboldt	1,474	38.10%	1,877	48.51%	11	0.28%	85	2.20%	421	10.88%	1	0.03%	-403	-10.42%	3,869
Inyo	283	43.81%	336	52.01%	7	1.08%	15	2.32%	5	0.77%	0	0.00%	-53	-8.20%	646
Kern	828	57.62%	525	36.53%	24	1.67%	50	3.48%	10	0.70%	0	0.00%	303	21.09%	1,437
Lake	804	56.18%	592	41.37%	0	0.00%	4	0.28%	31	2.17%	0	0.00%	212	14.81%	1,431
Lassen	484	51.22%	443	46.88%	2	0.21%	11	1.16%	5	0.53%	0	0.00%	41	4.34%	945
Los Angeles	5,064	43.30%	5,489	46.94%	133	1.14%	117	1.00%	797	6.84%	94	0.80%	-425	-3.63%	11,694
Marin	577	38.96%	681	45.98%	92	6.21%	119	8.04%	12	0.81%	0	0.00%	-104	-7.02%	1,481
Mariposa	630	57.17%	441	40.02%	10	0.91%	15	1.36%	6	0.54%	0	0.00%	189	17.15%	1,102
Mendocino	1,552	51.84%	1,219	40.71%	13	0.43%	85	2.84%	102	3.41%	23	0.77%	333	11.12%	2,994
Merced	939	54.25%	639	36.92%	5	0.29%	67	3.87%	81	4.68%	0	0.00%	300	17.33%	1,731
Modoc	636	54.45%	464	39.73%	1	0.09%	7	0.60%	60	5.14%	0	0.00%	172	14.73%	1,168
Mono	257	35.89%	425	59.36%	2	0.28%	20	2.79%	9	1.26%	3	0.42%	-168	-23.46%	716
Monterey	1,444	48.05%	1,393	46.36%	29	0.97%	33	1.10%	106	3.53%	0	0.00%	51	1.70%	3,005
Napa	1,340	45.69%	1,323	45.11%	113	3.85%	98	3.34%	52	1.77%	7	0.24%	17	0.58%	2,933
Nevada	1,792	42.78%	2,186	52.18%	39	0.93%	48	1.15%	121	2.89%	3	0.07%	-394	-9.41%	4,189
Placer	1,413	44.18%	1,665	52.06%	21	0.66%	32	1.00%	67	2.10%	0	0.00%	-252	-7.88%	3,198
Plumas	577	45.65%	666	52.69%	3	0.24%	12	0.95%	6	0.47%	0	0.00%	-89	-7.04%	1,264
Sacramento	2,331	34.26%	3,908	57.45%	266	3.91%	106	1.56%	192	2.82%	0	0.00%	-1,577	-23.18%	6,803
San Benito	702	47.89%	532	36.29%	4	0.27%	25	1.71%	202	13.78%	1	0.07%	170	11.60%	1,466
San Bernardino	1,503	46.49%	1,481	45.81%	22	0.68%	15	0.46%	205	6.34%	7	0.22%	22	0.68%	3,233
San Diego	1,159	41.01%	1,362	48.20%	43	1.52%	22	0.78%	240	8.49%	0	0.00%	-203	-7.18%	2,826
San Francisco	17,449	38.37%	15,675	34.46%	8,885	19.54%	3,127	6.88%	235	0.52%	110	0.24%	1,774	3.90%	45,481
San Joaquin	2,651	45.46%	2,446	41.94%	62	1.06%	211	3.62%	424	7.27%	38	0.65%	205	3.52%	5,832
San Luis Obispo	1,196	46.34%	1,212	46.96%	12	0.46%	55	2.13%	106	4.11%	0	0.00%	-16	-0.62%	2,581
San Mateo	740	40.59%	920	50.47%	94	5.16%	44	2.41%	25	1.37%	0	0.00%	-180	-9.87%	1,823
Santa Barbara	1,134	44.88%	1,174	46.46%	6	0.24%	12	0.47%	201	7.95%	0	0.00%	-40	-1.58%	2,527
Santa Clara	3,079	41.35%	3,501	47.01%	271	3.64%	247	3.32%	337	4.53%	12	0.16%	-422	-5.67%	7,447
Santa Cruz	1,189	39.63%	1,362	45.40%	150	5.00%	53	1.77%	244	8.13%	2	0.07%	-173	-5.77%	3,000
Shasta	1,227	47.10%	1,298	49.83%	18	0.69%	9	0.35%	52	2.00%	1	0.04%	-71	-2.73%	2,605
Sierra	575	36.74%	924	59.04%	7	0.45%	34	2.17%	25	1.60%	0	0.00%	-349	-22.30%	1,565
Siskiyou	995	50.61%	934	47.51%	5	0.25%	5	0.25%	27	1.37%	0	0.00%	61	3.10%	1,966
Solano	2,047	47.64%	1,957	45.54%	55	1.28%	117	2.72%	115	2.68%	6	0.14%	90	2.09%	4,297
Sonoma	2,699	45.16%	2,631	44.03%	268	4.48%	154	2.58%	224	3.75%	0	0.00%	68	1.14%	5,976
Stanislaus	1,086	60.17%	596	33.02%	16	0.89%	36	1.99%	70	3.88%	1	0.06%	490	27.15%	1,805
Sutter	653	46.64%	661	47.21%	2	0.14%	2	0.14%	81	5.79%	1	0.07%	-8	-0.57%	1,400
Tehama	1,039	46.49%	931	41.66%	243	10.87%	7	0.31%	15	0.67%	0	0.00%	108	4.83%	2,235
Trinity	469	48.30%	463	47.68%	4	0.41%	33	3.40%	2	0.21%	0	0.00%	6	0.62%	971
Tulare	1,905	49.88%	1,475	38.62%	25	0.65%	183	4.79%	225	5.89%	6	0.16%	430	11.26%	3,819
Tuolumne	1,115	55.81%	782	39.14%	13	0.65%	22	1.10%	66	3.30%	0	0.00%	333	16.67%	1,998
Ventura	634	44.62%	721	50.74%	1	0.07%	13	0.91%	44	3.10%	8	0.56%	-87	-6.12%	1,421
Yolo	1,408	48.82%	1,196	41.47%	92	3.19%	30	1.04%	157	5.44%	1	0.03%	212	7.35%	2,884
Yuba	1,129	48.71%	1,043	45.00%	16	0.69%	60	2.59%	69	2.98%	1	0.04%	86	3.71%	2,318
Total	84,970	43.43%	84,316	43.10%	12,227	6.25%	7,347	3.76%	6,432	3.29%	336	0.17%	654	0.33%	195,628

==== Counties that flipped from Democratic to Republican ====
- Alameda
- Calaveras
- Contra Costa
- Inyo
- Los Angeles
- Marin
- Placer
- Plumas
- Sacramento
- San Luis Obispo
- San Mateo
- Santa Barbara
- Santa Clara
- Santa Cruz
- Shasta
- Sutter
- Ventura

==== Counties that flipped from Republican to Democratic ====
- Napa
- Solano
