= Henry Markham =

18th Governor of California, U.S. congressman

Henry Harrison Markham
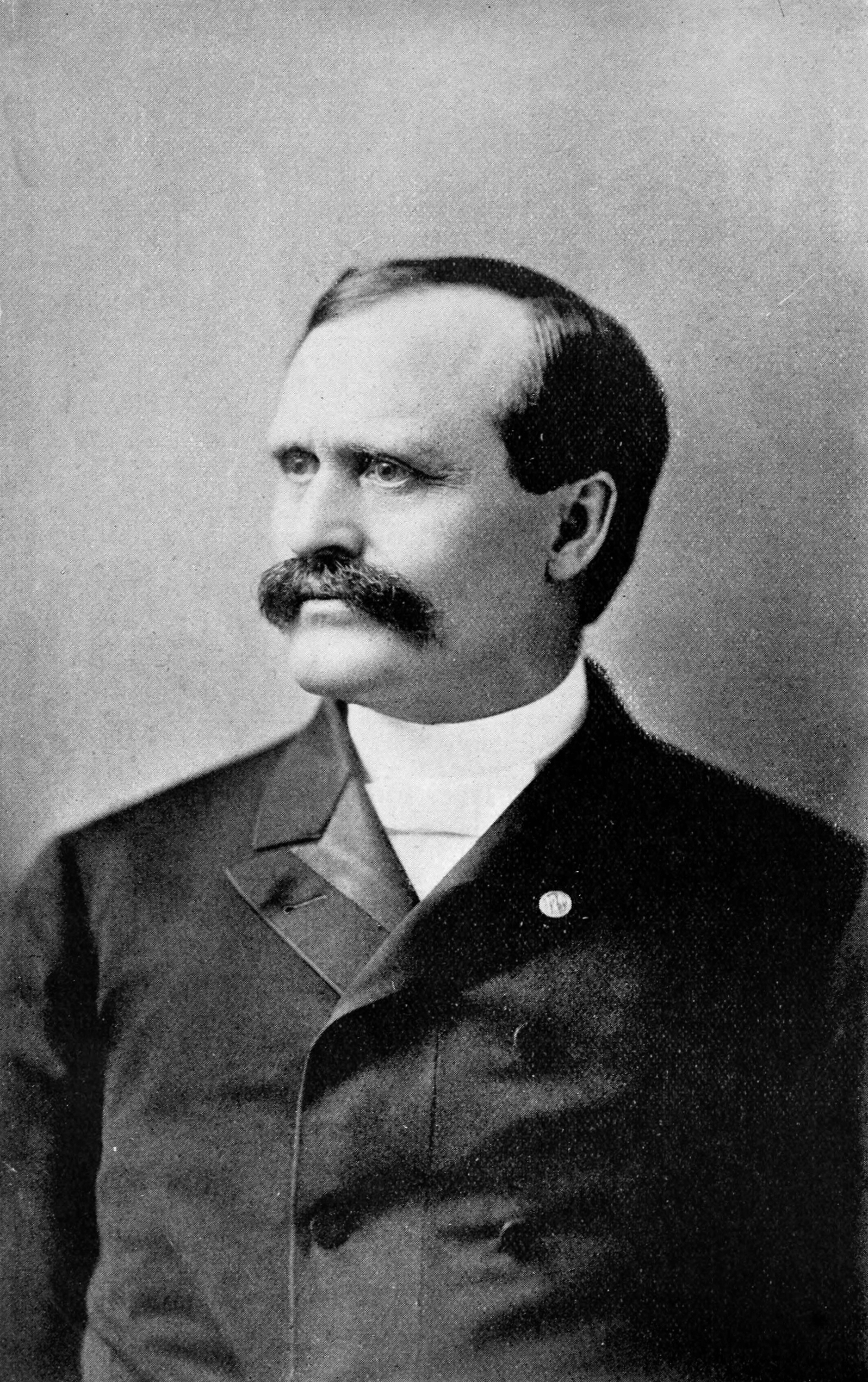
- Markham c. 1890

18th Governor of California
- In office January 8, 1891 – January 11, 1895
- Lieutenant: John B. Reddick
- Preceded by: Robert Waterman
- Succeeded by: James Budd

Member of the U.S. House of Representatives from California's 6th district
- In office March 4, 1885 – March 3, 1887
- Preceded by: District created
- Succeeded by: William Vandever

Personal details
- Born: November 16, 1840 Wilmington, New York, US
- Died: October 9, 1923 (aged 82) Pasadena, California, US
- Party: Republican
- Spouse: Mary A. Dana (m. 1876–1923)
- Children: 5
- Occupation: Lawyer, soldier and politician

Military service
- Allegiance: United States
- Branch/service: United States Volunteers; Union Army
- Years of service: 1863–1865
- Rank: 2nd Lieutenant, USV
- Unit: 32nd Reg. Wis. Vol. Infantry
- Battles/wars: American Civil War

Henry Harrison Markham (November 16, 1840 – October 9, 1923) was an American lawyer and Republican politician. He was the 18th governor of California (1891–1895), and represented California's 6th congressional district during the 49th United States Congress (1885–1887). Earlier in life, he served as a Union Army officer in the American Civil War.

== Early life ==
Markham was born in Wilmington, New York, on November 16, 1840. He attended the common schools of his hometown and Wheeler's Academy in Vermont. He moved to Wisconsin in 1861.

== Career ==
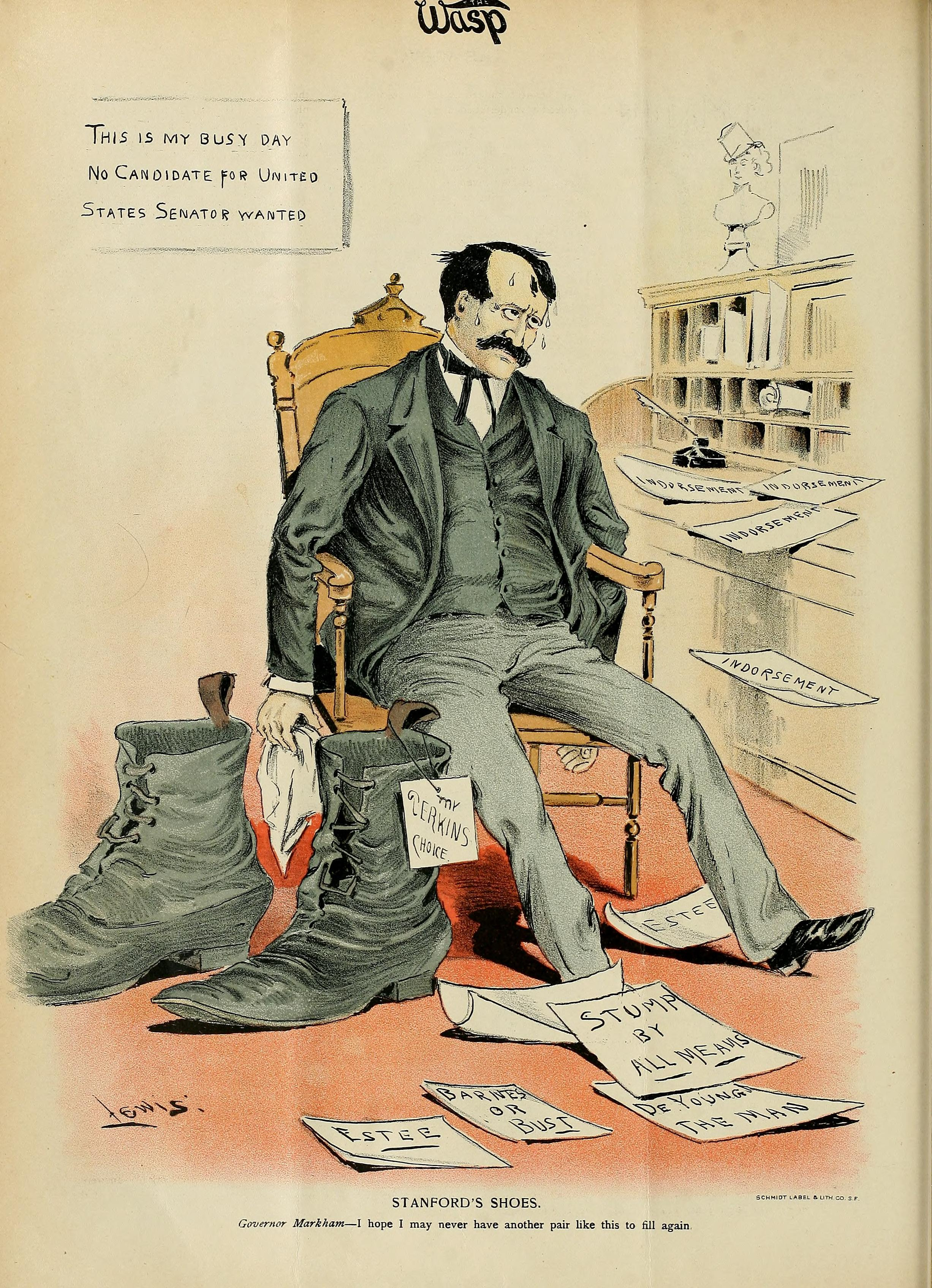
"Stanford's Shoes," a caricature of Markham published in The Wasp, July 29, 1893

During the Civil War, Markham enlisted as a private in Company G, 32nd Wisconsin Infantry Regiment; he was promoted to second lieutenant. Markham was part of General William Tecumseh Sherman's March to the Sea in 1864. He was wounded at the Battle of Rivers' Bridge in 1865, and discharged.

After the war Markham returned to Wisconsin and settled in Milwaukee, where he studied law and passed the bar in 1867. He practiced law in Milwaukee in the state and federal courts. In 1879, Markham moved to Pasadena, California and continued the practice of law.

=== Congress ===
Markham was elected as a Republican to the 49th Congress in 1884, but declined to seek renomination in 1886.

=== Governor ===
He was elected governor of California in 1890 and inaugurated in January 1891. During his term, California's economy suffered badly from the Panic of 1893. Hoping to boost economic recovery, Markham strongly backed the California Midwinter International Exposition of 1894, held in San Francisco's Golden Gate Park; it was a resounding success. Markham declined to seek a second term as governor in 1894.

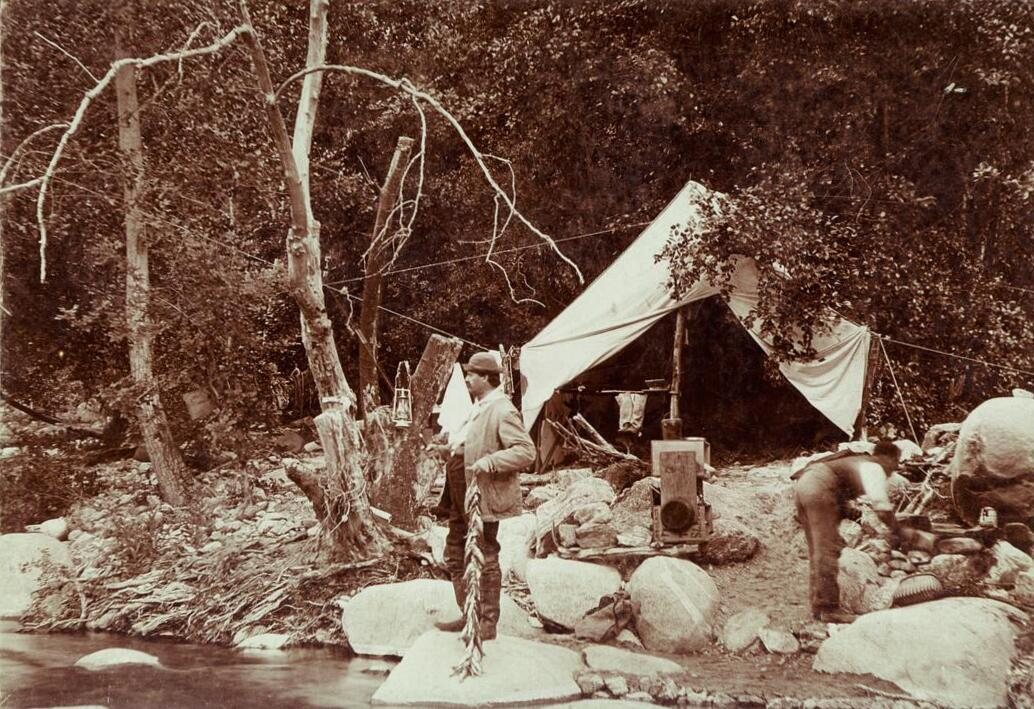
Ex-Governor Markham at his fishing camp on the West Fork of San Gabriel River, c. 1896

=== Later career ===
In Pasadena Markham was on the school board and was one of the founders of the Pasadena public library. He was also part of the Calico Union Mining Company. During his run for governor he was referred to as "the dashing colonel from Pasadena," and he was a longtime member of the Pasadena Republican Club.

== Personal life ==
On May 17, 1876, Markham married Mary A. Dana in Waukesha, Wisconsin. He purchased a 23-acre ranch in Pasadena, California, and he and his family moved there in 1879. They had five daughters: Marie, Alice, Gertrude, Genevieve, and Hildreth.

=== Death and burial ===
On October 9, 1923, Markham died in his Pasadena home at age 82. He was interred at Mountain View Cemetery in Altadena.

== Electoral history ==
1884 United States House of Representatives elections
Party	Candidate	Votes	%
Republican	Henry Markham	17,397	49.1
Democratic	R. A. Del Valle	16,990	47.9
Prohibition	Will D. Gould	821	2.3
Populist	Isaac Kinley	237	0.7
Total votes		35,445	100.0
Republican win (new seat)			

California gubernatorial election, 1890
Party	Candidate	Votes	%	±%
Republican	Henry Markham	125,129	49.56%	+6.46%
Democratic	Edward B. Pond	117,184	46.42%	+2.98%
Prohibition	John Bidwell	10,073	3.99%	+0.70%
	Scattering	71	0.03%	
Majority		7,945	3.15%	
Total votes		252,457	100.00%	
Republican hold		Swing	+3.48%	

Party political offices
Preceded by John Franklin Swift	Republican nominee for Governor of California; 1890	Succeeded by Morris M. Estee
Political offices
Preceded by Robert Waterman	Governor of California; 1891–1895	Succeeded by James Budd
U.S. House of Representatives
Preceded by None	Member of the U.S. House of Representatives from California's 6th congressional district 1885–1887	Succeeded by William Vandever
