= 1886 California lieutenant gubernatorial election =

- November 2, 1886
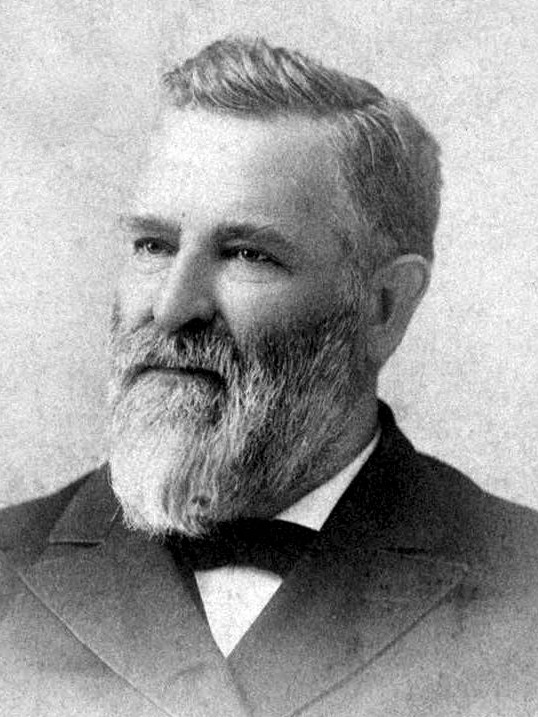

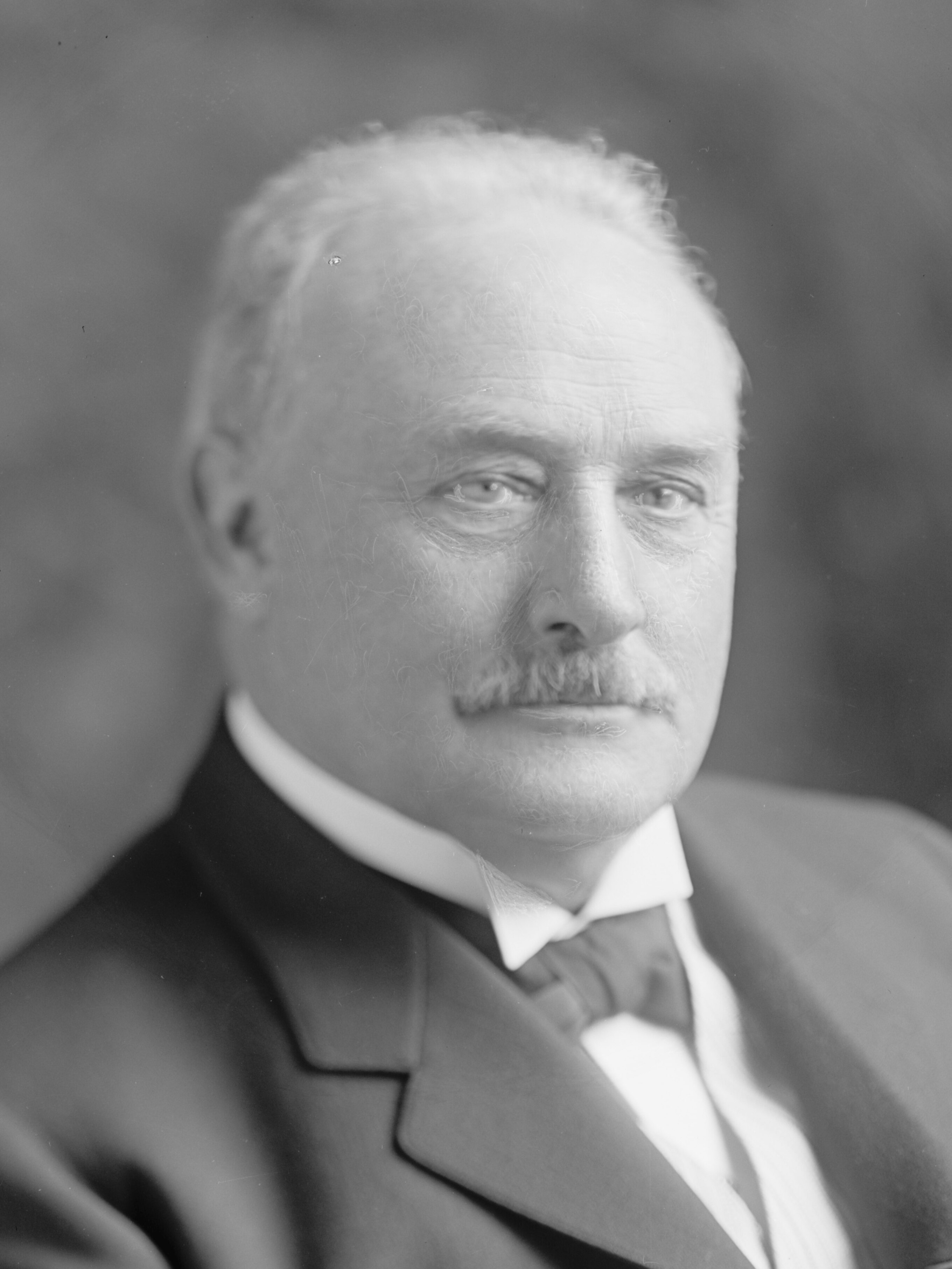
Nominee	Robert Waterman	M. F. Tarpey
Party	Republican	Democratic
Popular vote	94,969	92,476
Percentage	48.72%	47.44%
- County results Waterman: 40–50% 50–60% 60–70% Tarpey: 40–50% 50–60% 60–70%
Lieutenant Governor before election
John Daggett
Democratic
Elected Lieutenant Governor
Robert Waterman
Republican

The 1886 California lieutenant gubernatorial election was held on November 2, 1886, in order to elect the lieutenant governor of California. Republican nominee Robert Waterman defeated Democratic nominee M. F. Tarpey, Prohibition nominee A. D. Boren and Independent candidate Horace Bell.

== General election ==
On election day, November 2, 1886, Republican nominee Robert Waterman won the election by a margin of 2,493 votes against his foremost opponent Democratic nominee M. F. Tarpey, thereby gaining Republican control over the office of lieutenant governor. Waterman was sworn in as the 17th lieutenant governor of California on January 3, 1887.

=== Results ===
California lieutenant gubernatorial election, 1886
Party	Candidate	Votes	%
Republican	Robert Waterman	94,969	48.72
Democratic	M. F. Tarpey	92,476	47.44
Prohibition	A. D. Boren	5,836	2.99
Independent	Horace Bell	1,658	0.85
Total votes		194,939	100.00
Republican gain from Democratic			
