= George Henry Sanderson =

22nd Mayor of San Francisco from 1891 to 1893

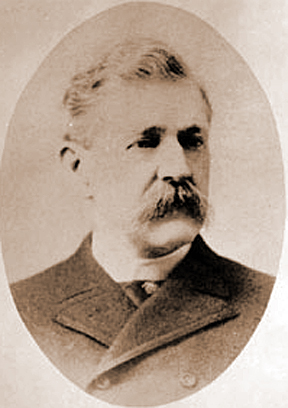

22nd Mayor of San Francisco
- In office January 5, 1891 – January 3, 1893
- Preceded by: Edward B. Pond
- Succeeded by: Levi Richard Ellert

Personal details
- Born: Boston, Massachusetts, US
- Died: February 1, 1893 San Francisco, California, US
- Resting place: Cypress Lawn Memorial Park
- Party: Republican

George Henry Sanderson (1824 – February 1, 1893) was a politician of the United States Republican Party. Sanderson was born in Boston, Massachusetts, and traveled to San Francisco during the 1849 Gold Rush in California. He served as the 22nd Mayor of San Francisco from January 5, 1891, to January 3, 1893.

== Biography ==
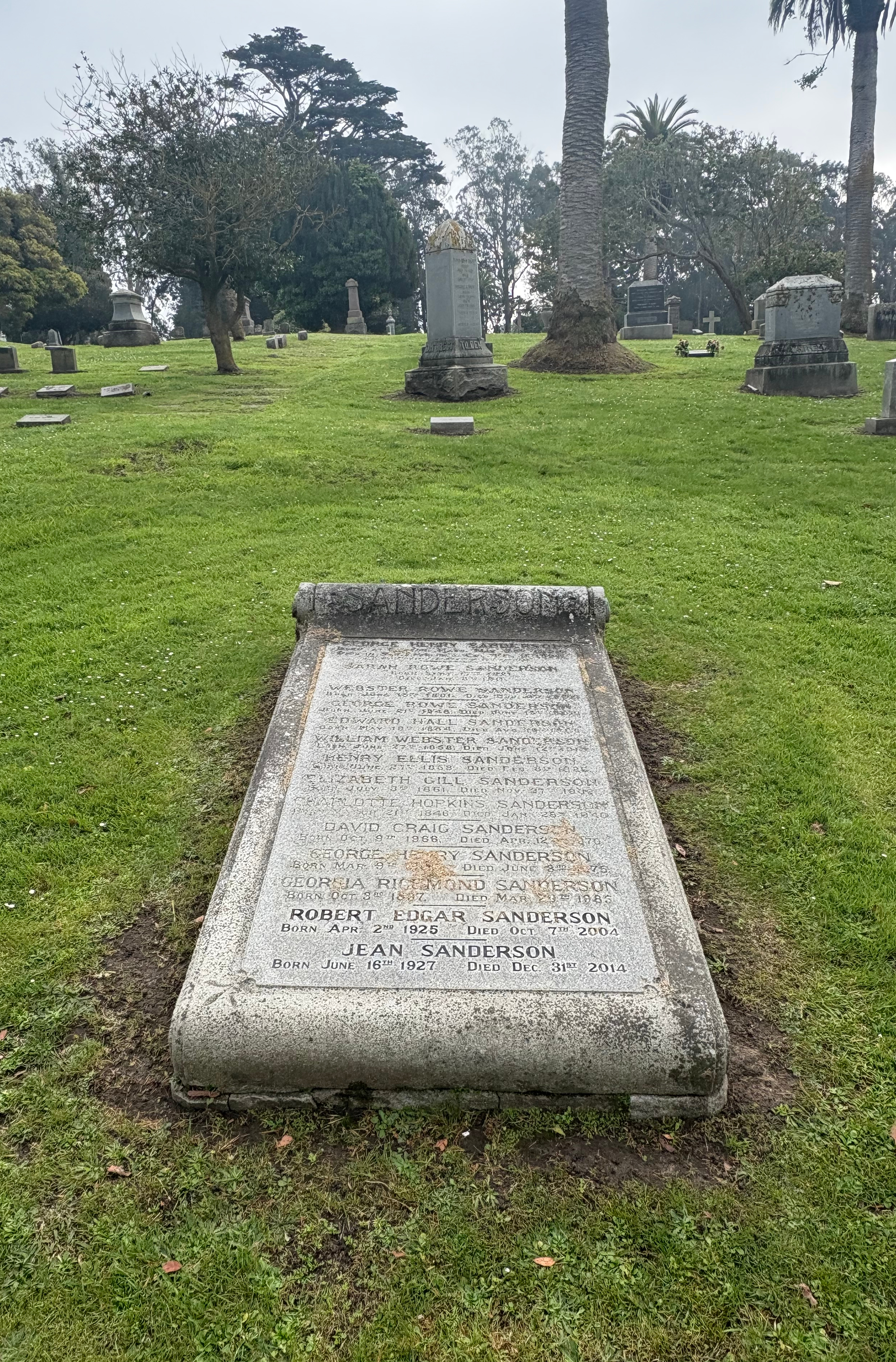
Sanderson's grave at Cypress Lawn Memorial Park

According to his own account, Sanderson worked in a dry goods business in Boston at the age of 19. He married Sarah Dyer Rowe in 1844; they had a son, George Rowe Sanderson, who was two years old when Sanderson departed Boston in 1849.

At age 26, he sailed to San Francisco around Cape Horn, arriving in March 1850, and left for the gold mines in August of that year. He settled in Stockton, California, the gateway to the Southern Mines, establishing a general merchandise store. His wife and son had stayed behind in Boston when he came to California, and they joined him in Stockton in 1852. The couple had three more sons, including the twins Henry Ellis ("Harry") and William Webster ("Will") Sanderson.

For two years, Sanderson served as the Chief of the Stockton Fire Department (Protection Hook and Ladder Co. #1, established November 15, 1851). He served as the Controller/Auditor of Stockton in 1853 and Alderman in 1854. He also served as Secretary of the Executive Committee of the 1857 State Fair and was appointed Secretary of the State Agricultural Society in 1863. He belonged to Stockton's Independent Order of Odd Fellows (IOOF); the charter number is unknown.

In 1865, he moved to San Francisco, joining the firm of Weaver, Wooster & Co. He later founded the firm of Root and Sanderson in 1875. He was president of the Merchants Club, a member of the California Academy of Sciences, the Olympic Club, the Art Association, and the Mercantile Library Association. He was a trustee of the Chamber of Commerce and Director/President of the Board of Trade of San Francisco and served as Mayor of that city in 1891–92. He died February 1, 1893, shortly after completing his second term in office. He was buried at Cypress Lawn Memorial Park in Colma.
