= Agustín Olvera =

American politician (1820–1876)

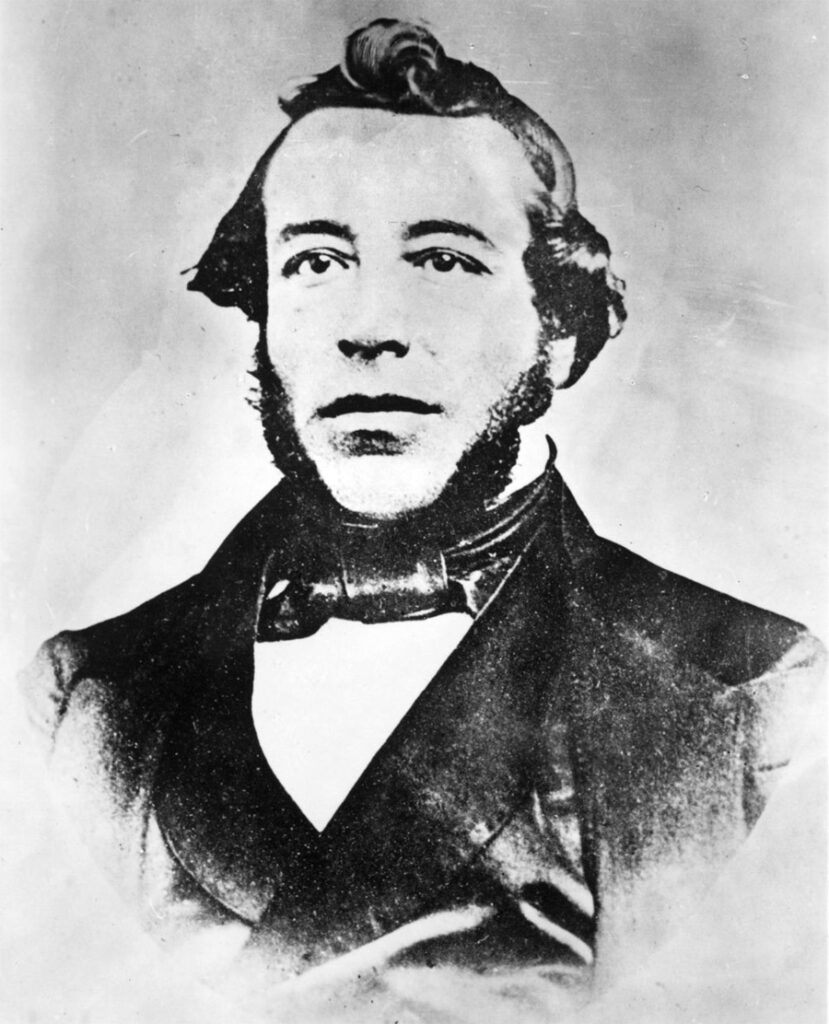
- Born: 1820
- Died: 1876 (aged 55–56); Los Angeles, California, U.S.
- Occupations: Ranchero, politician

Agustín Olvera (1820–1876) was a Californio judge, ranchero, and politician in 19th century Los Angeles. Olvera served as the first elected Los Angeles County Judge and also served on the Los Angeles Common Council. He is the namesake of Olvera Street by the Plaza de Los Ángeles.

== Biography ==
Accompanying his uncle, Ygnacio Coronel, he came to California in 1834 as a member of the Híjar-Padrés Colony. In 1842, Olvera married Concepción Argüello (1815–1853), daughter of Santiago Argüello. After her death, Olvera married in 1859 Maria Ortega (1823–1918), widow of Edward Stokes.

Olvera held various offices in the Mexican administration. Olvera was granted Rancho Mission Viejo in 1842 and the Rancho Cuyamaca in 1845. Olvera helped to bridge the gap between the governance of California by Mexico and the United States. Olvera later served as captain in Flores' campaign against Frémont and was one of the commission of three that negotiated peace with the American forces at Cahuenga. As a commissioner he signed the Treaty of Cahuenga ending the war in California.

U.S. Military Governor Bennet Riley appointed Olvera to be Judge of the First Instance in 1849. Augustin Olvera was subsequently elected the first county judge of the newly formed County of Los Angeles in 1850. He relied upon a bilingual Sheriff to translate the proceedings from Spanish because he did not speak English when he first took the bench. Along with his legal duties, Olvera was responsible, with his two associate justices, for administering county business until the establishment of the Los Angeles County Board of Supervisors two years later. When his term expired in 1853, he entered the private practice of law. He was a Los Angeles County Supervisor in 1855.

Olvera was a member of the Los Angeles Common Council in 1851–52.

== Legacy ==
In 1877, the Los Angeles Common Council changed the name of Vine Street to Olvera Street in his honor. Olvera held the first county court trials in his home near the historic Olvera Street marketplace and plaza.

In 1959, the actor Cesar Romero played Olvera in an episode of the same name on the syndicated television anthology series, Death Valley Days, hosted by Stanley Andrews.
