= Levi Richard Ellert =

23rd Mayor of San Francisco from 1893 to 1895

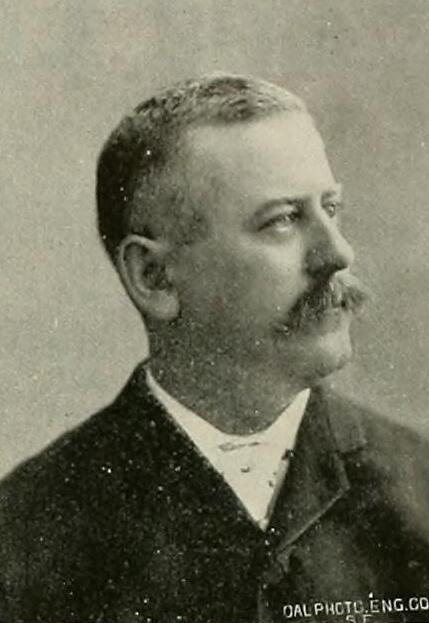
- Portrait by I. W. Taber c. 1890

23rd Mayor of San Francisco
- In office January 4, 1893 – January 6, 1895
- Preceded by: George Henry Sanderson
- Succeeded by: Adolph Sutro

Member of the San Francisco Board of Supervisors from Ward 6
- In office 1889 – January 4, 1893
- Preceded by: A.M. Burns

Personal details
- Born: October 20, 1857 San Francisco
- Died: July 21, 1901 (aged 43) San Francisco
- Party: Republican

Levi Richard Ellert (October 20, 1857 – July 21, 1901) was an American politician. He served as 23rd Mayor of San Francisco, serving from 1893 to 1895.

== Biography ==
Before entering politics, he had established his own pharmacy in 1883. After unsuccessfully running for School Director, he was elected Supervisor as a Republican in 1888 and was reelected in 1890. He was elected mayor in 1892, and during his term, he passed the bar exam and was admitted to the California bar. He also "appeared before the Supreme Court."

He served as 23rd Mayor of San Francisco, serving from 1893 to 1895. He was the first San Francisco native to serve in that office; no previous San Francisco mayors had even been born in California.

After his term, he would serve as director of various private companies and as general manager and the president of the Sanitary Reduction Works.

== Death and legacy ==
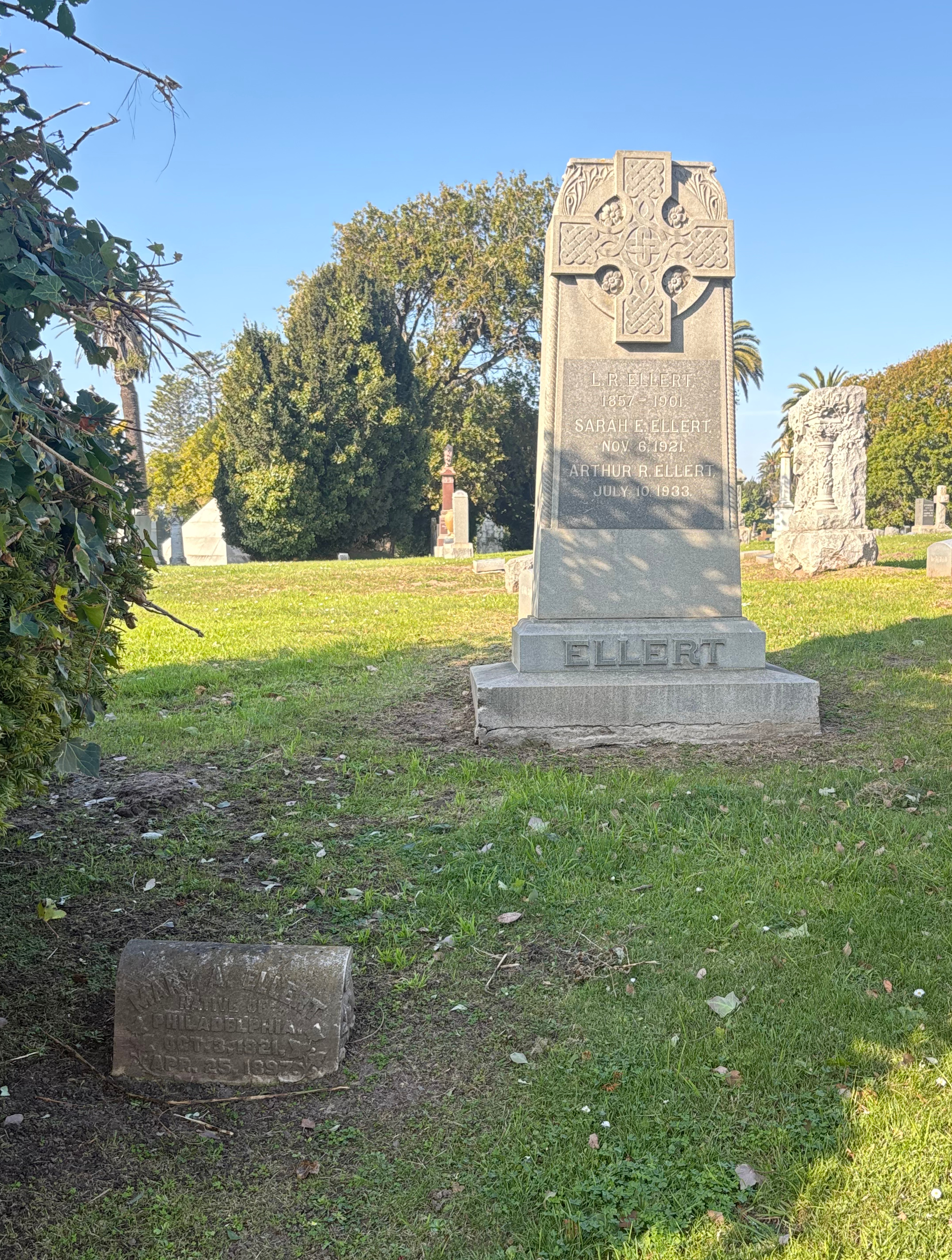
Ellert's grave at Cypress Lawn Memorial Park

Ellert died in 1901 in San Francisco, and was buried at Cypress Lawn Memorial Park in Colma, California.

Ellert Street in the Bernal Heights neighborhood of San Francisco is named for him.

== Sources ==
- Hanson, Gladys. San Francisco Almanac. San Francisco, CA: Chronicle Books, 1995. (ISBN 0-8118-0841-6)
