= Rancho Cuyamaca =

Mexican land grant in the Cuyamaca Mountains and Laguna Mountains

Coordinates: 32.960°N 116.570°W

Rancho Cuyamaca was a 35,501-acre (143.67 km^{2}) Mexican land grant in the Cuyamaca Mountains and Laguna Mountains, in present-day San Diego County, California, United States.

It was given in 1845 by Governor Pío Pico to Agustín Olvera. The grant extended south of present-day Julian and encompassed Cuyamaca Rancho State Park, Lake Cuyamaca, and Cuyamaca Peak.

== History ==
Olvera remained in the Pueblo of Los Angeles and never resided on the grant. For several years, his agent Cesario Walker began lumber operations but was driven out by local Indians.

With the cession of California to the United States following the Mexican-American War, the 1848 Treaty of Guadalupe Hidalgo provided that the land grants would be honored. As required by the Land Act of 1851, a claim for Rancho Cuyamaca was filed with the Public Land Commission in 1852. The grant contained no mention of size nor was there any description of boundaries. It was specified in the grant that it was to be measured and maps made. But, with the exception of a crude map of indefinite date, nothing seems to have been done until it came before the land commission.

In 1869, Olvera sold one-third to his lawyer, Isaac Hartman and the remaining two-thirds to Samual Stewart. Stewart in turn sold one-half of the two-thirds to Robert Allison and one-fourth to John Treat. He later sold the remaining one-fourth to Allison and Juan Luco jointly.

Following the discovery of gold in the Julian area in 1870, a dispute as to the boundaries of the rancho arose. The new owners attempted to extend Rancho Cuyamaca boundaries northward to Rancho Santa Ysabel and include the Julian mines. The miners, supported by the general public of San Diego, claimed the land was public. Four years later, the area of the rancho was fixed at eight square leagues and the northern boundary line 7 miles south of Julian.

The grant was patented to Agustín Olvera in 1874.

Although the boundary dispute has been settled, conflicting ownership claims forced a new survey and partition into 14 lots among 10 owners in 1879.

In 1886 Robert W. Waterman acquired most of the grant. After Waterman's death, the Sather Banking Company foreclosed on the rancho. In 1917, Adolph G. Gassen of San Diego acquired the rancho from the bank. Ralph M. Dyar of Los Angeles acquired the rancho in hopes of developing a mountain resort. After the start of the Great Depression, Dyar sold the rancho to California State Parks in 1933. It is currently Cuyamaca Rancho State Park.

== See also ==
- Ranchos of San Diego County, California
- List of Ranchos of California
- Ranchos of California
- Cuyamaca Mountains
