= Edward B. Pond =

21st Mayor of San Francisco from 1887 to 1891

Edward Bates Pond
- Pond c. 1891

21st Mayor of San Francisco
- In office January 7, 1887 – January 7, 1891
- Preceded by: Washington Bartlett
- Succeeded by: George Henry Sanderson

Member of the San Francisco Board of Supervisors from Ward 6
- In office 1883 – January 7, 1887
- Preceded by: George Torrens
- Succeeded by: A.M. Burns

Personal details
- Born: September 7, 1833 Belleville, New York, U.S.
- Died: April 22, 1910 (aged 76) San Francisco, California, U.S.
- Resting place: Mountain View Cemetery, Oakland, California
- Party: Democratic

Edward Bates Pond (September 7, 1833 – April 22, 1910) was an American politician active in California. He was the 21st Mayor of San Francisco serving from 1887 to 1891.

== Political career ==
Pond as a member of the San Francisco Board of Supervisors, 1883

In 1890, he ran for Governor of California. At the California Democratic State Convention, San Francisco Boss Christopher Buckley backed Mayor Pond. Edward B. Pond defeated William D. English of Oakland for the nomination. In the general election, Edward Pond lost to Republican, Henry Markham.

== Personal life ==
His grandson was Samuel 'Pete' Pond (1914–2004), a former Dean at Stanford University.

Party political offices
Preceded by Washington Bartlett	Democratic nominee for Governor of California; 1890	Succeeded by James Budd
