= Washington Bartlett =

16th Governor of California and 20th Mayor of San Francisco

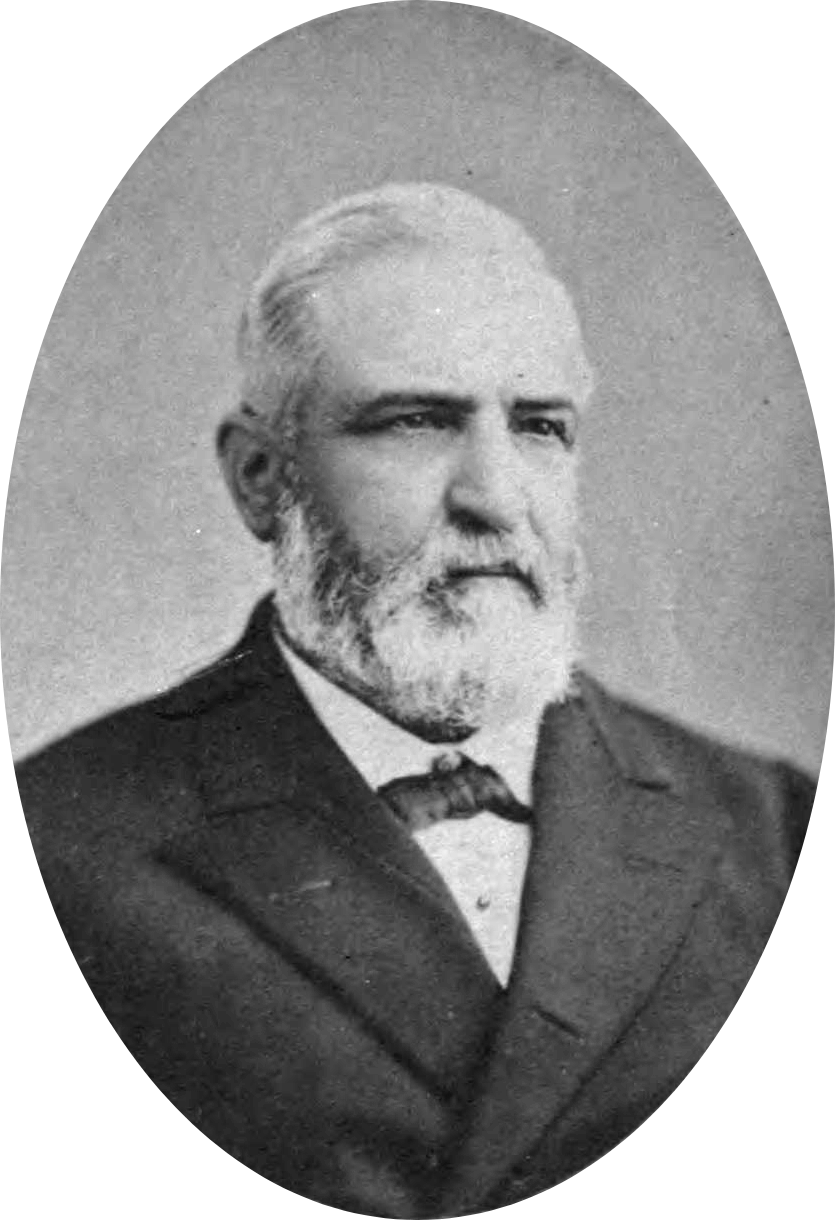
- Bartlett c. 1883

16th Governor of California
- In office January 8, 1887 – September 12, 1887
- Lieutenant: Robert Waterman
- Preceded by: George Stoneman
- Succeeded by: Robert Waterman

20th Mayor of San Francisco
- In office January 8, 1883 – January 2, 1887
- Preceded by: Maurice Carey Blake
- Succeeded by: Edward B. Pond

Member of the California Senate from the 8th district
- In office December 1, 1873 – December 6, 1875
- Preceded by: Multi-member district
- Succeeded by: Multi-member district

Personal details
- Born: Washington Montgomery Bartlett; February 29, 1824 Savannah, Georgia, U.S.
- Died: September 12, 1887 (aged 63) Oakland, California, U.S.
- Party: Democratic
- Other political affiliations: People's Independent (1873)

Washington Montgomery Bartlett (February 29, 1824 – September 12, 1887) was an American politician who served as the 16th governor of California from January 1887 until his death in September of that year, as well as the 20th mayor of San Francisco from 1883 to 1887. He was the first Jewish governor of any U.S. state and – to date – the only Jewish governor of California.

== Biography ==
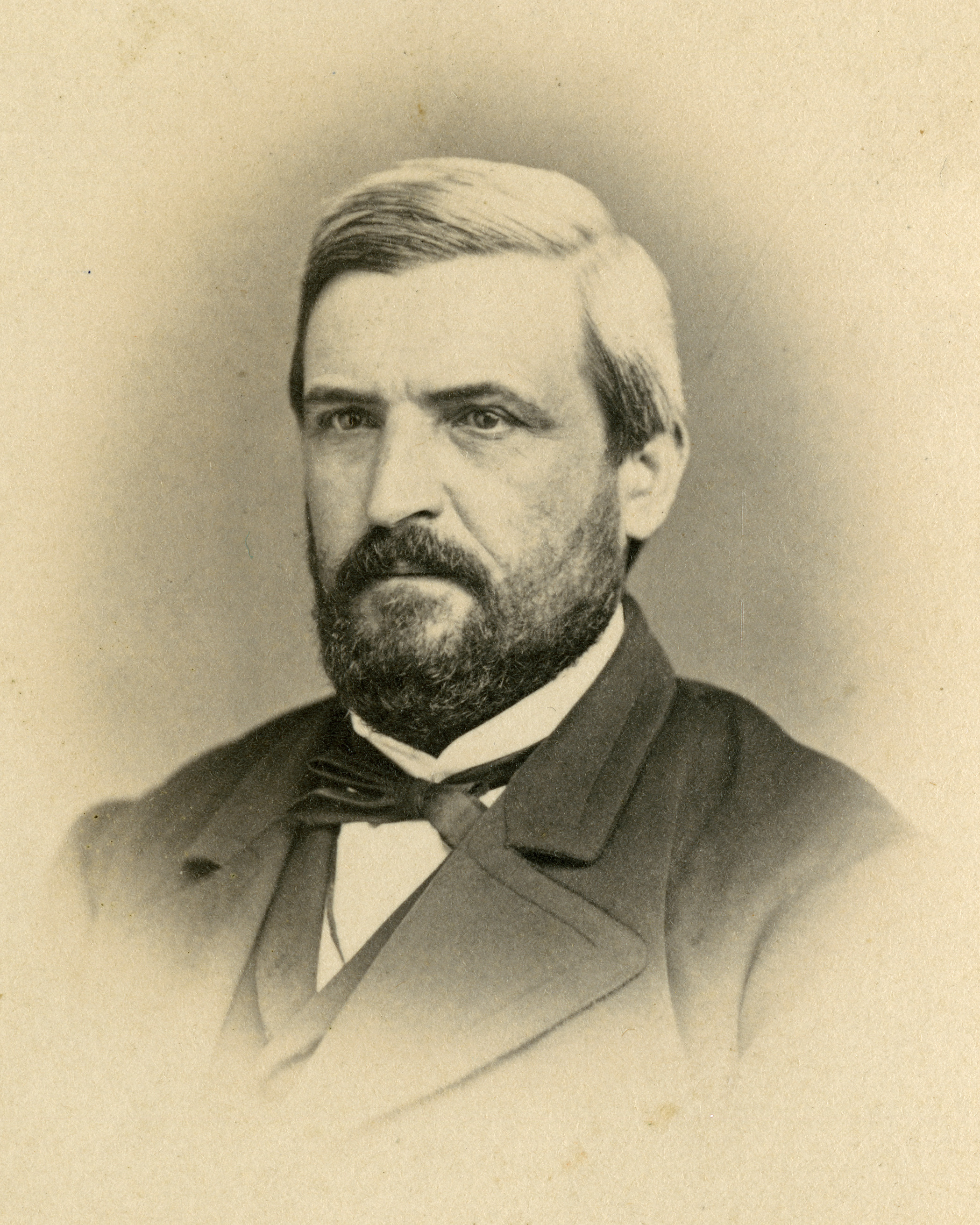
Bartlett in 1865

Bartlett was born in Savannah, Georgia on February 29, 1824, the son of Sarah E. Melhado and Cosam Emir Bartlett. His mother was a Sephardic Jew. Unlike the second elected Jewish governor, Moses Alexander of Idaho, Bartlett was not particularly religious and did not participate in Jewish observances while in California.

A lifelong bachelor and a printer by trade, he became a lawyer as well. During his lifetime Bartlett was a San Francisco newspaper publisher, San Francisco County Clerk, California state senator, mayor of San Francisco from 1883–87, and finally governor, elected in 1886.

Bartlett was sworn in as governor and gave his inaugural address on January 8, 1887. He died of Bright's disease barely eight months into his term, on September 12, 1887. His service as governor was the second shortest in California's history as a state; only Milton S. Latham, who served just five days in 1860, had a shorter tenure.

Bartlett's funeral was conducted at Trinity Episcopal Church in San Francisco. He is buried in Mountain View Cemetery in Oakland, California. Bartlett converted to Congregationalism on his deathbed and was buried as a Christian.

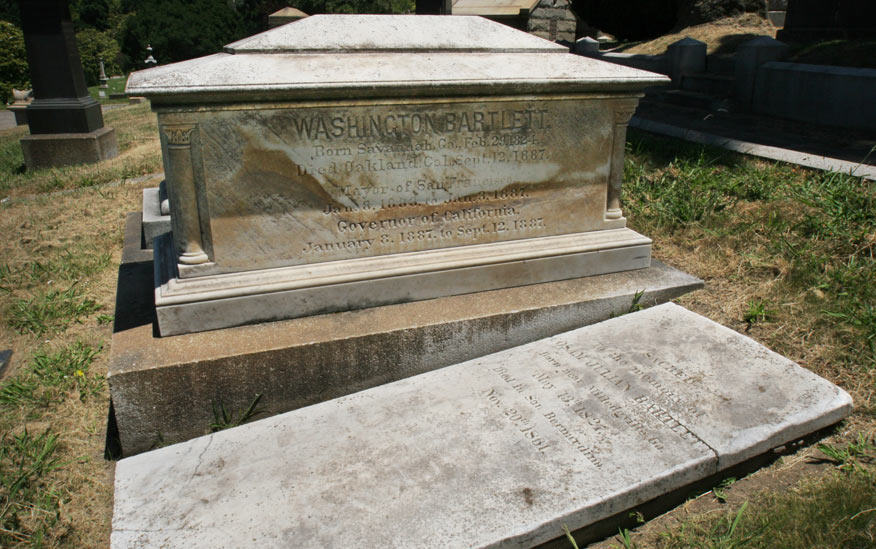
Washington Bartlett's tomb at Mountain View Cemetery in Oakland, California.

Political offices
| Preceded by Maurice Carey Blake | Mayor of San Francisco; 1883–1887 | Succeeded by Edward B. Pond |
| Preceded by George Stoneman | Governor of California; 1887 | Succeeded by Robert Waterman |
Party political offices
| Preceded by George Stoneman | Democratic nominee for Governor of California; 1886 | Succeeded by Edward B. Pond |
