= C. C. O'Donnell =

American politician (1834–1912)

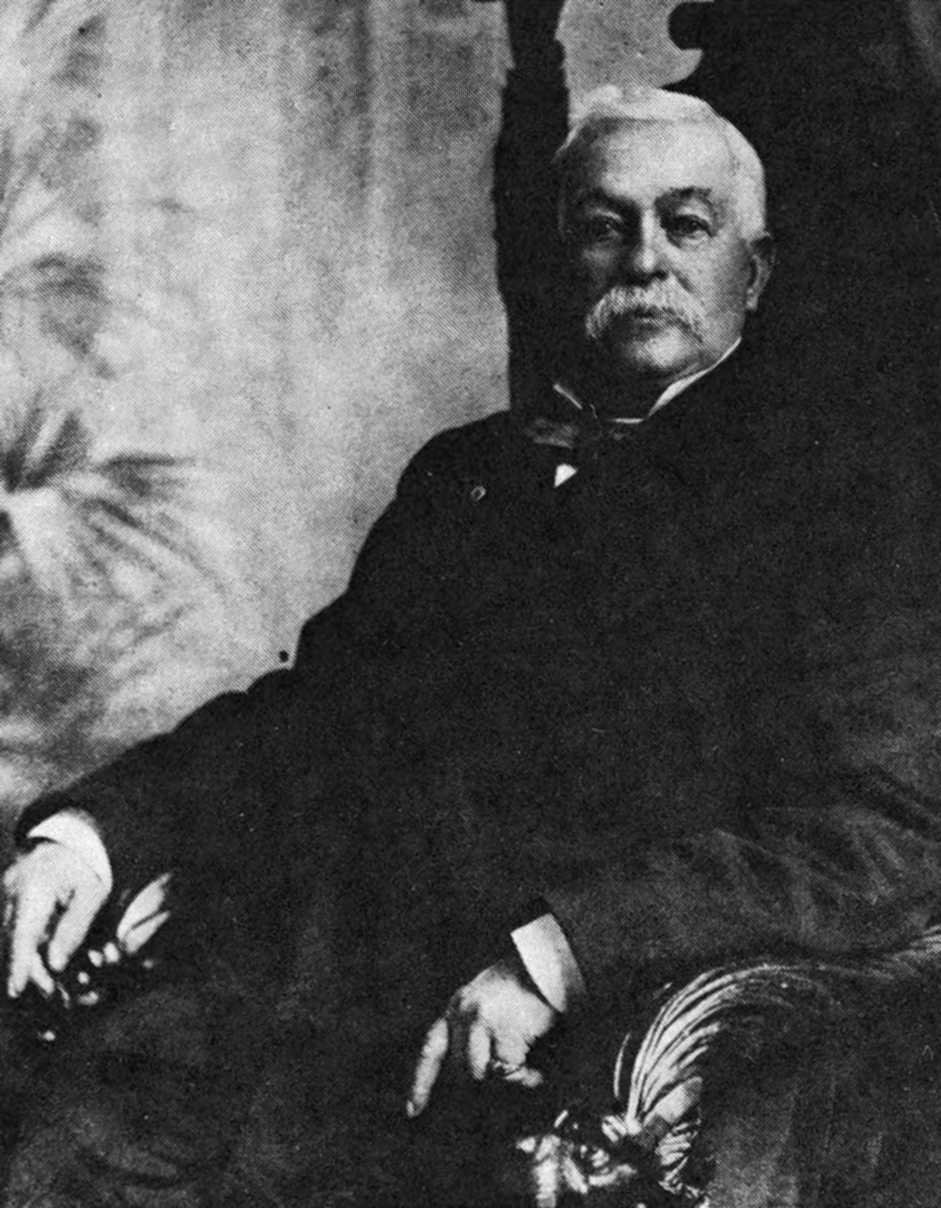

Coroner of San Francisco
- In office January 6, 1885 – January 4, 1887
- Preceded by: Marc Levingston
- Succeeded by: James Stanton

Delegate to the Second Constitutional Convention of California
- In office September 28, 1878 – March 3, 1879
- Preceded by: Office established
- Succeeded by: Office abolished
- Constituency: San Francisco

Personal details
- Born: May 3, 1834 Baltimore, Maryland, U.S.
- Died: May 27, 1912 (aged 78) San Francisco, California, U.S.
- Party: Independent
- Other political affiliations: Workingmen's (1877–1879)
- Children: George
- Relatives: All claimed: Charles Carroll of Carrollton (godfather); Columbus O'Donnell (uncle); Alexander Hamilton (great uncle)

Military service
- Allegiance: United States
- Branch/service: United States Army; California National Guard
- Years of service: 1861–c. 1865; 1868–1871
- Rank: Field Surgeon; Captain
- Unit: 1st Infantry Regiment, Sarsfield Rifle Guard
- Battles/wars: Civil War

Charles Carroll O'Donnell (May 3, 1834 – May 27, 1912) was an American physician, politician and perennial candidate who served as coroner of San Francisco from 1885 to 1887. A founding member of the Workingmen's Party of California, O'Donnell was known for the Anti-Chinese racism that colored most of his campaigns. He ran for office so many times that, upon his death, The San Francisco Call remarked that "a municipal campaign in this city was never complete without Doctor O'Donnell being among the candidates."

== Political career ==
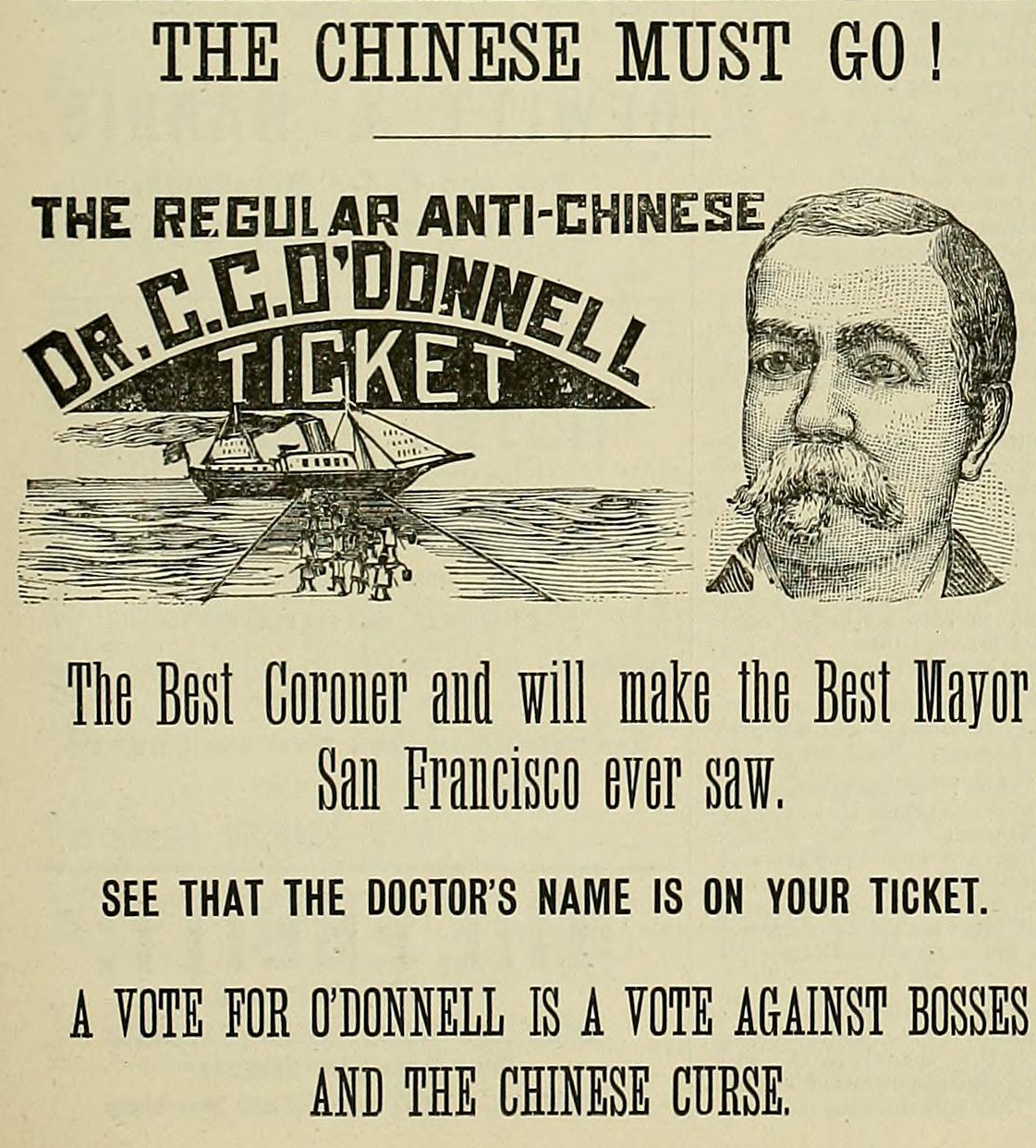
An advertisement for O'Donnell's mayoral candidacy published in The Wasp, November 3, 1888

In 1878, O'Donnell was elected a delegate to California's Second Constitutional Convention on the Workingmen's ticket, representing San Francisco. He ran for Coroner twice before his 1884 election and for Mayor of San Francisco six times between 1888 and 1901. He also ran for Governor of California in 1886, Congress in 1900, and California Railroad Commission in 1902. Despite running in most elections as an independent, he earned over 30% of the vote in his first four runs for Mayor and often came in second place.

=== Coroner ===
O'Donnell's term as coroner has received mixed historical appraisals. In 1938, historian Robert E. Cowan described O'Donnell as "one of the most capable and efficient coroners the city has had," highlighting the institution of several reforms that were still in force fifty years later. By contrast, forensic pathologist Terry Allen dubbed O'Donnell "San Francisco's worst coroner" in 2002, drawing attention to the fact that, when accused of performing illegal abortions, the "Doctor" admitted that he had never graduated from medical school. Allen also criticized O'Donnell for his violent anti-Chinese racism; he had blamed "coolie slaves" for everything from unemployment to poverty to suicides. O'Donnell was even alleged to have aided a fellow doctor cover up the murder of his wife by agreeing to have the body buried before an autopsy could be performed. The body was later exhumed and, upon examination, was found to have been poisoned. The doctor was hung.

== Personal life ==
O'Donnell was named for Charles Carroll of Carrollton, who he claimed to be a lineal descendant of at one point and a godson of at another. He further claimed to be a nephew of Columbus O'Donnell and a grandnephew of Alexander Hamilton.

O'Donnell served as a field surgeon in the Union Army during the Civil War, during which he was rumored to have sawed off the arms and legs of prisoners of war so they couldn't fight for the enemy again. He later served as a Captain in the California National Guard from 1868 to 1871.

O'Donnell's son, George Washington O'Donnell, was also a doctor. Like his father, he was "notorious" for performing illegal abortions, and by 1921 had been arrested thirty times for such operations.

== Caricature gallery ==
"Sketches of San Francisco Characters"

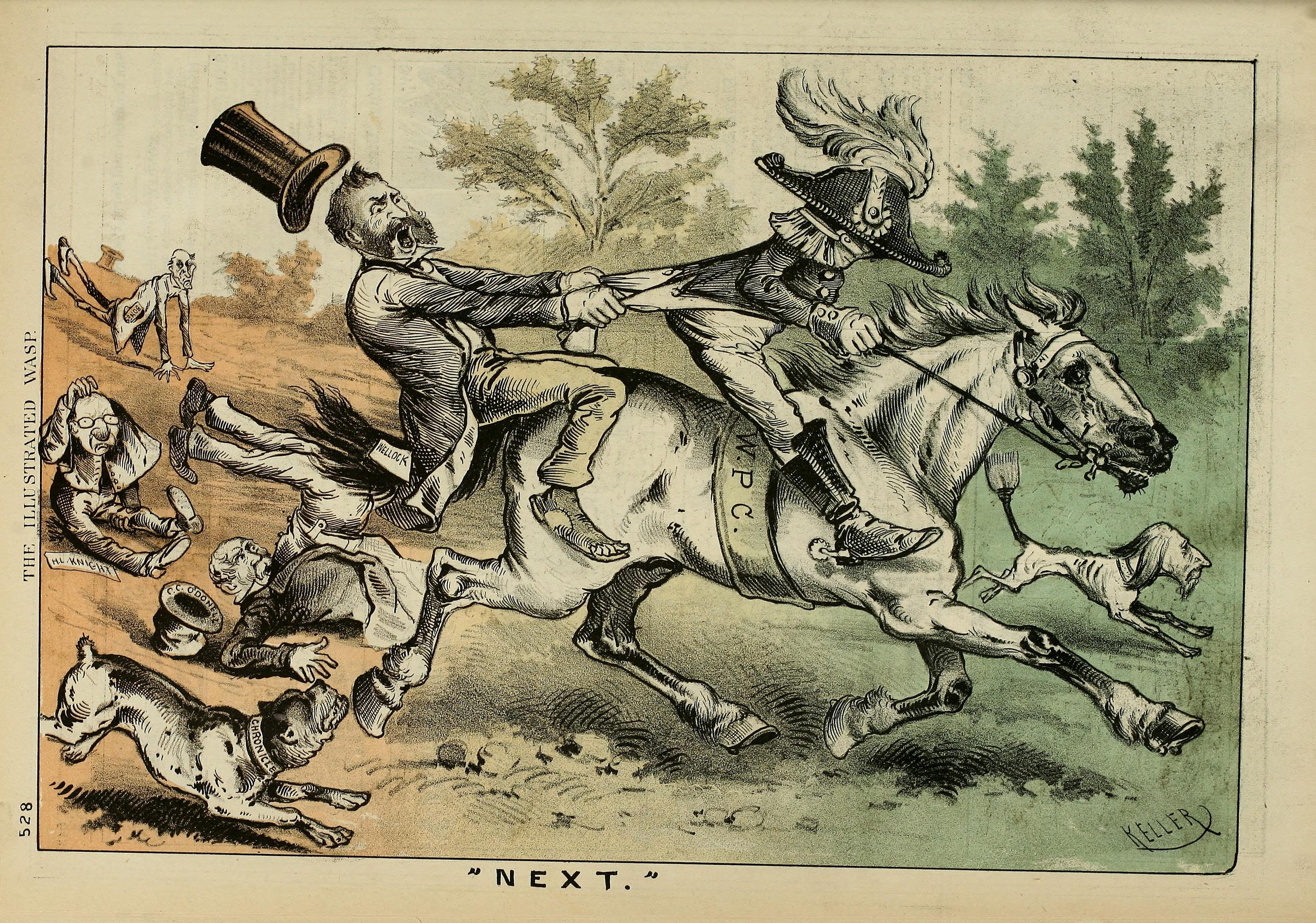
"Next"

"The Wasp’s Candidates for Public Office"

"The Coroner's Panel Game"

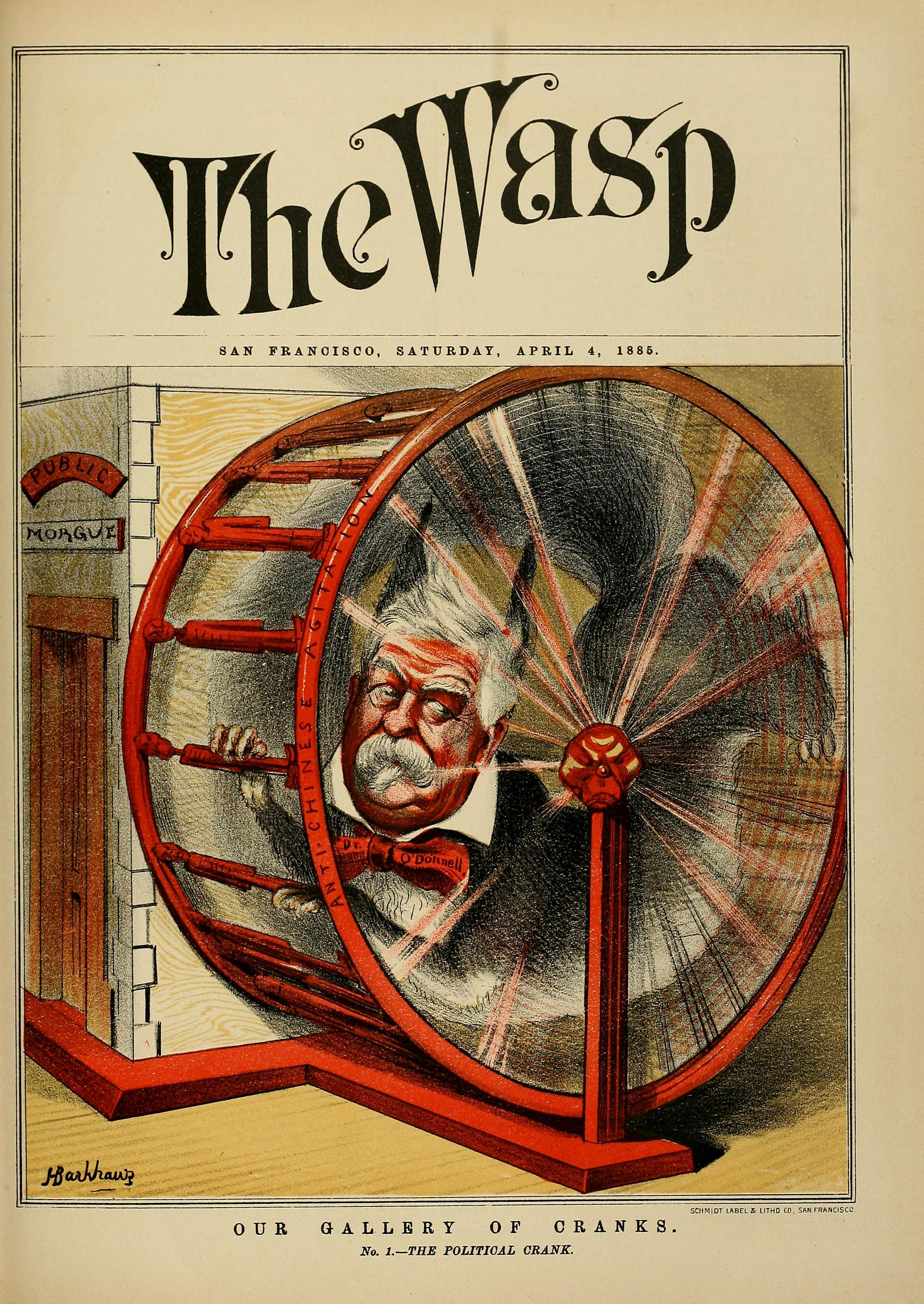
"The Political Crank"

"On His High Horse"

"Under the Black Flag"

"Malaria a Cure for Dementia"

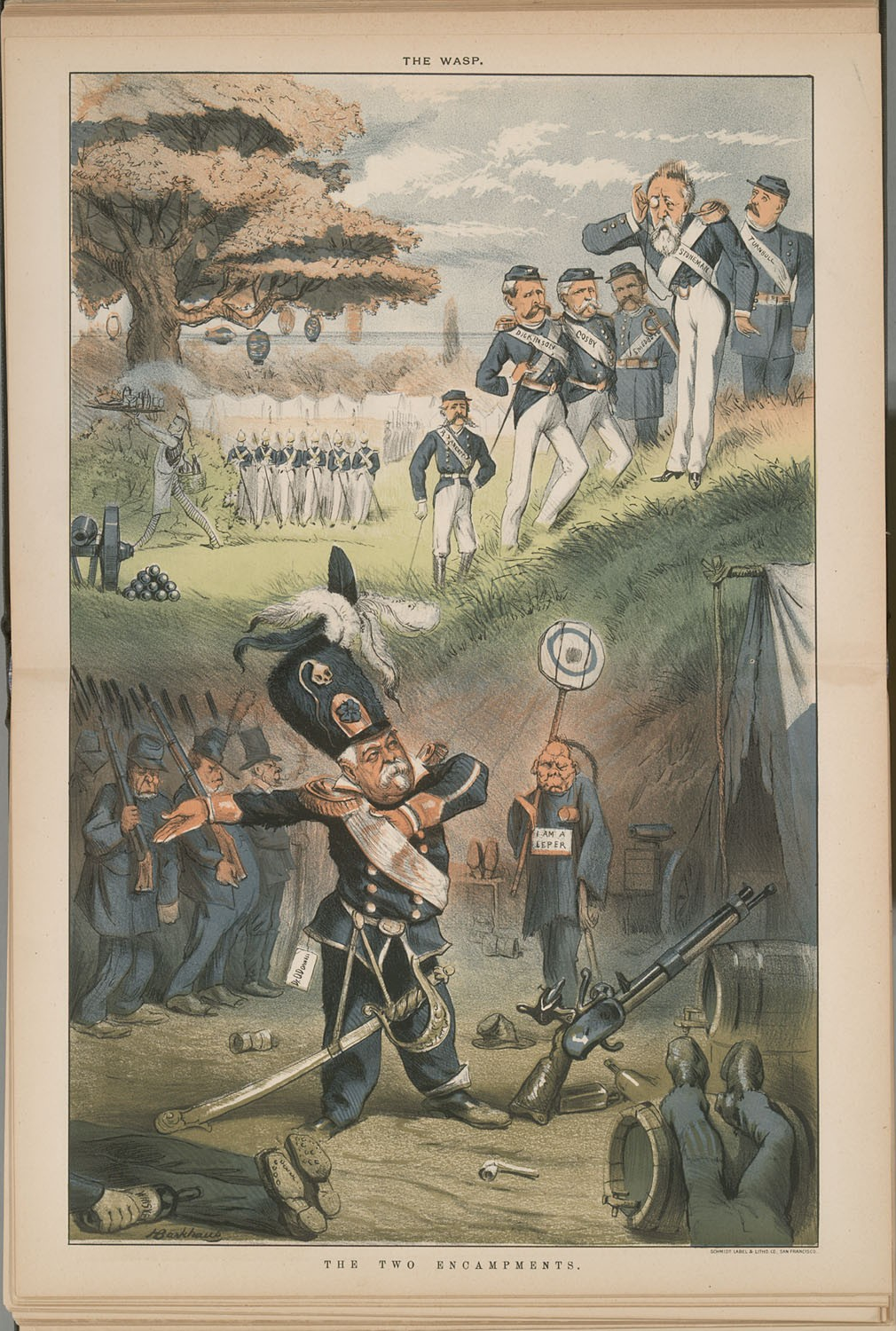
"The Two Encampments"

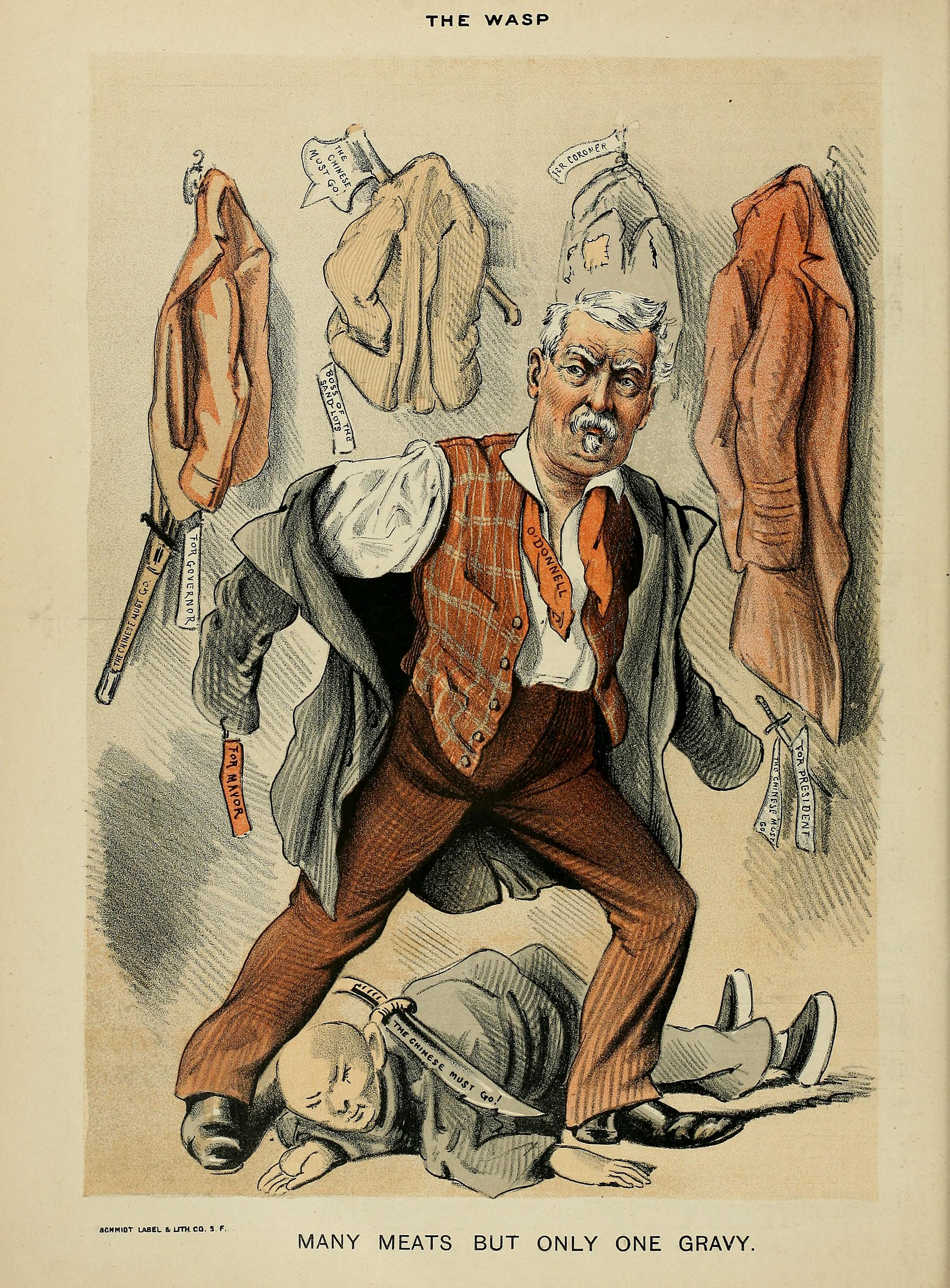
"Many Meats But Only One Gravy"

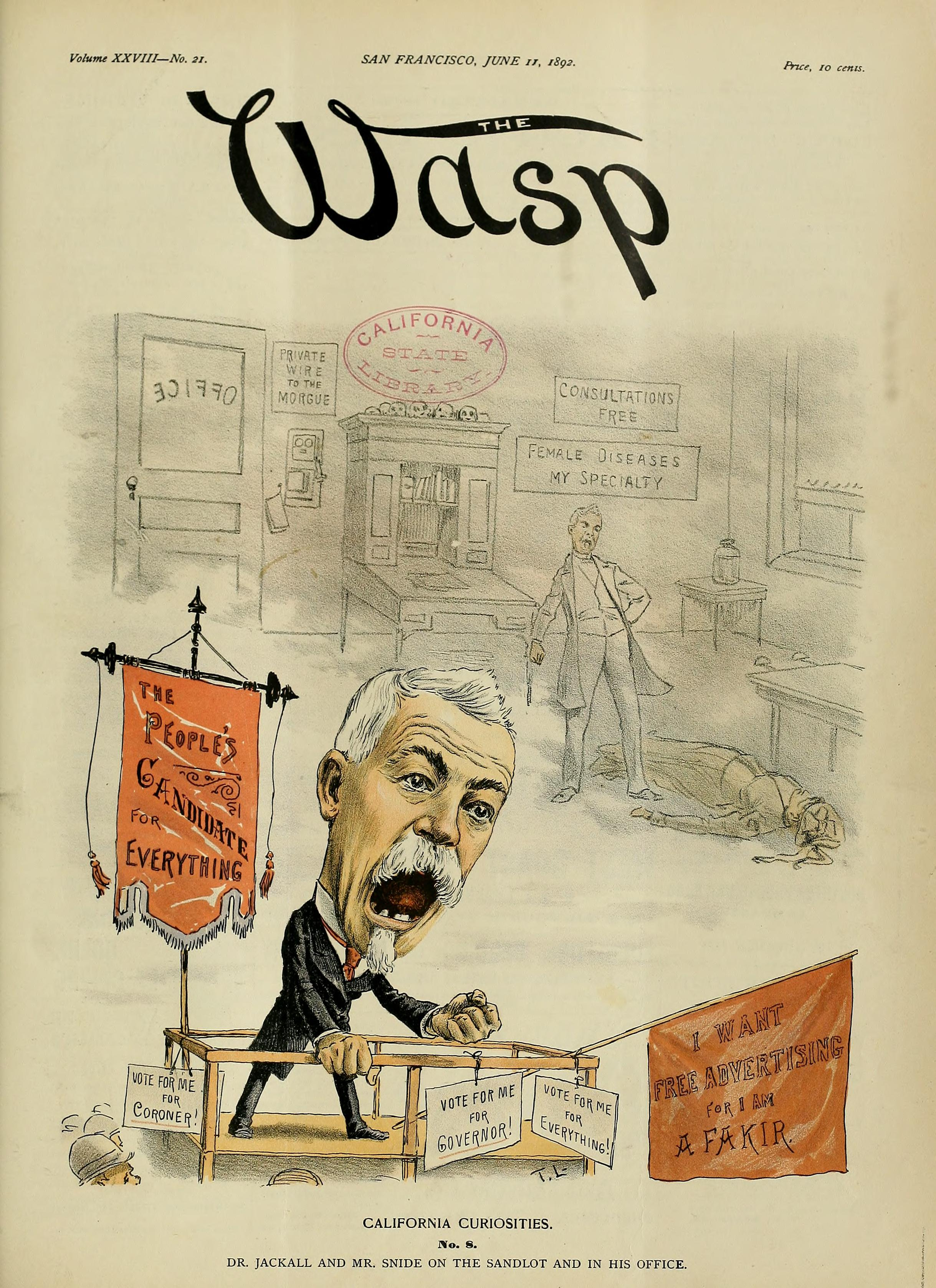
"Dr. Jackall and Mr. Snide on the Sandlot and in His Office"

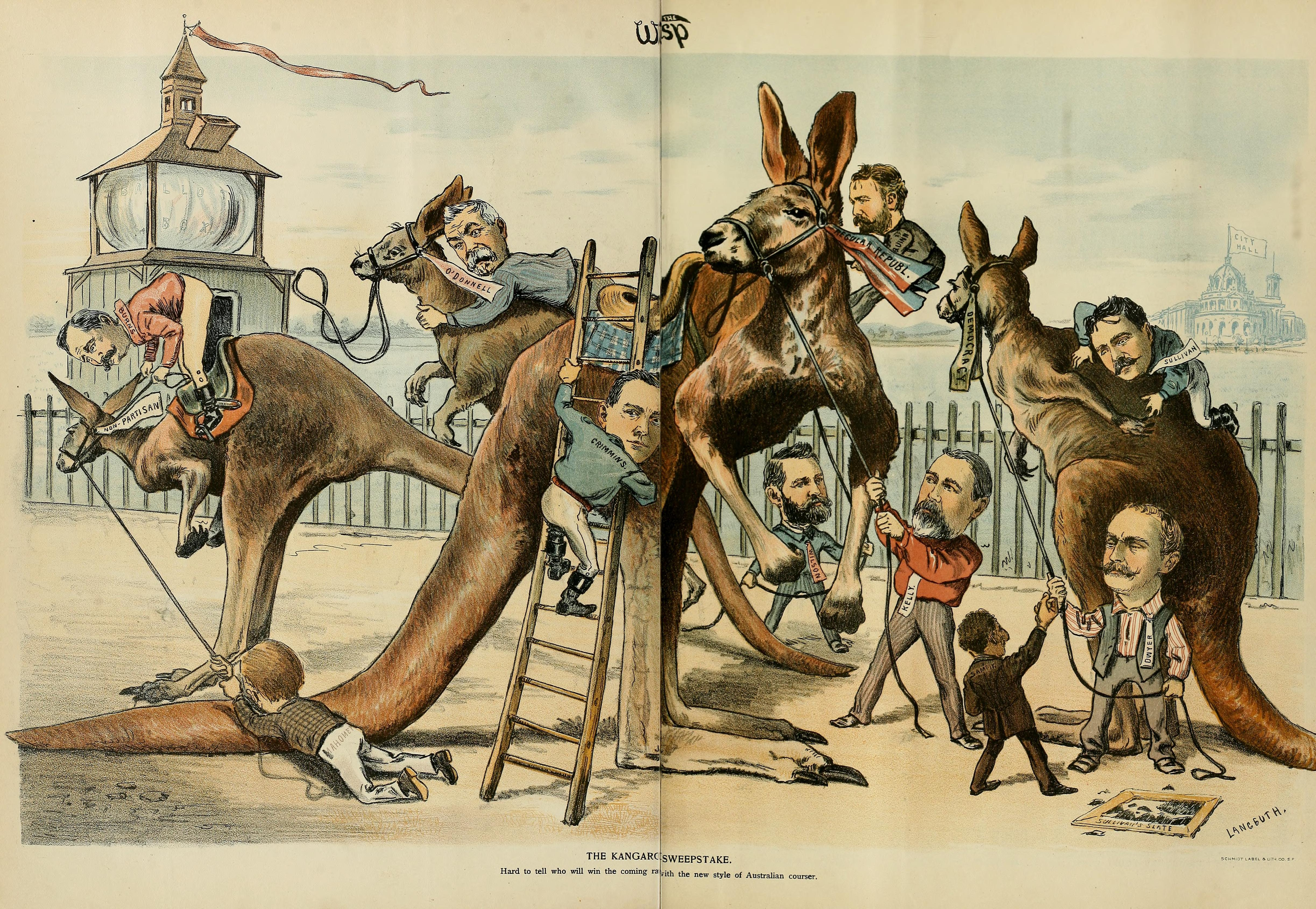
"The Kangaroo Sweepstake"

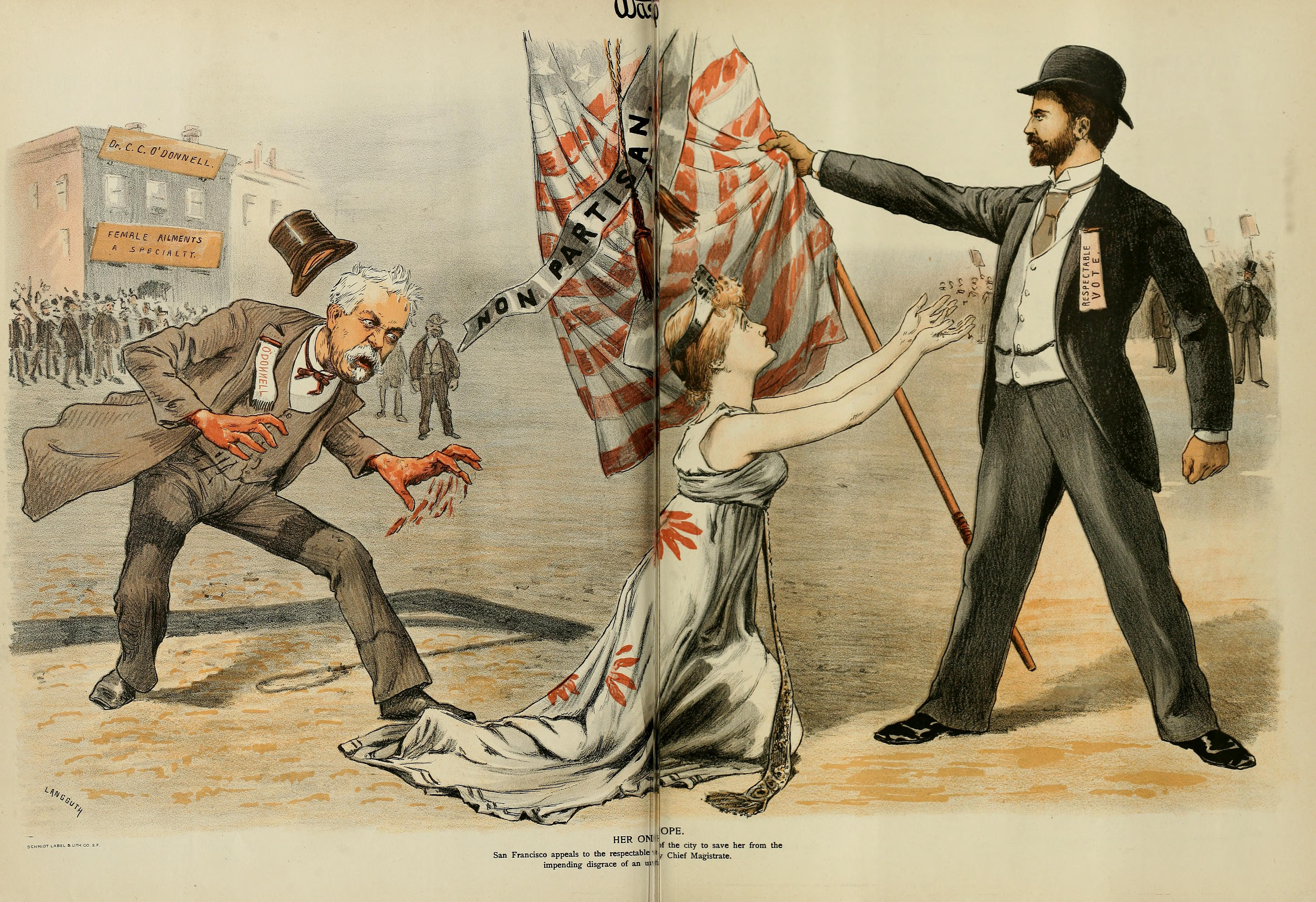
"Her Only Hope"

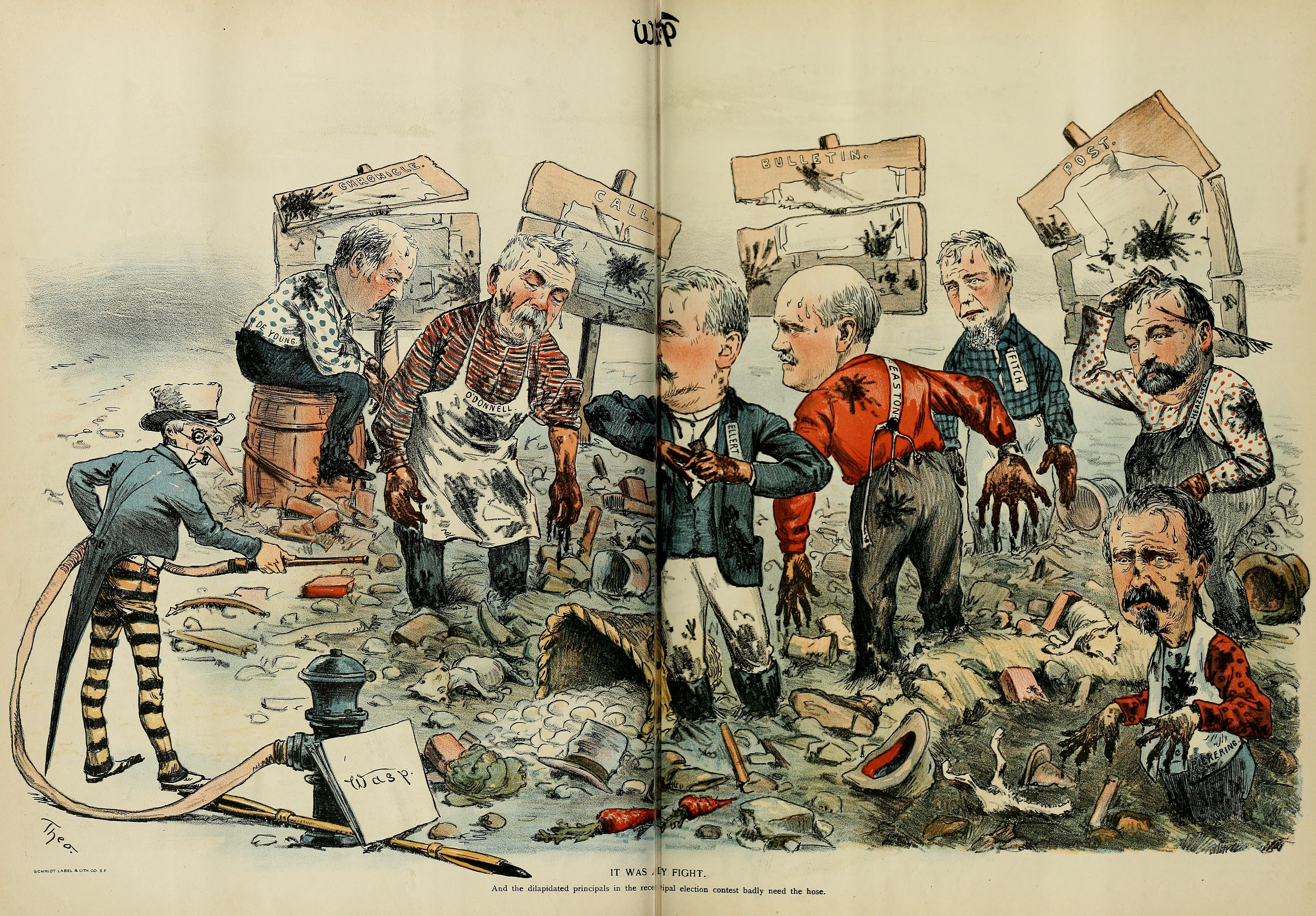
"It Was A Dirty Fight"

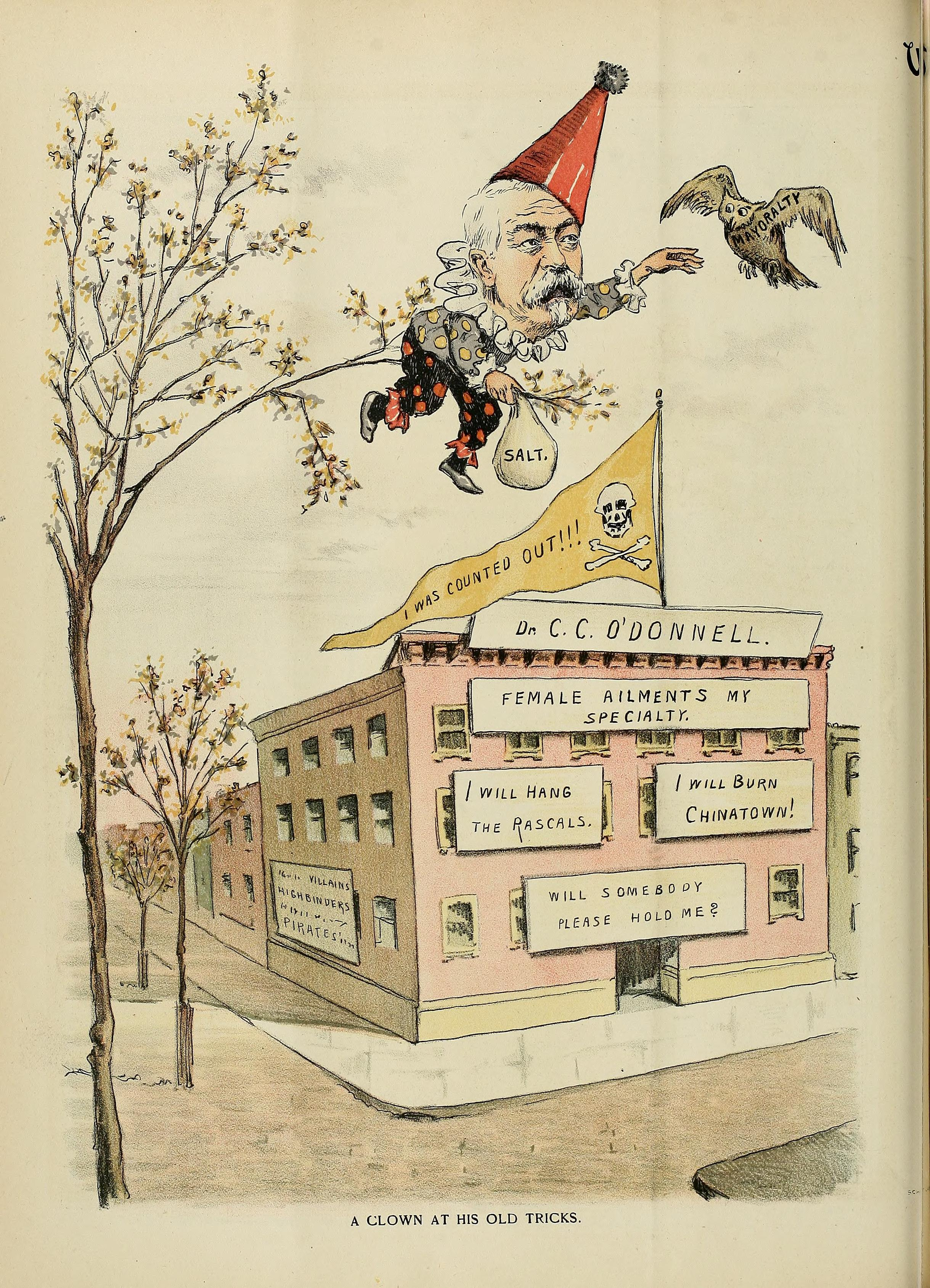
"A Clown At His Old Tricks"

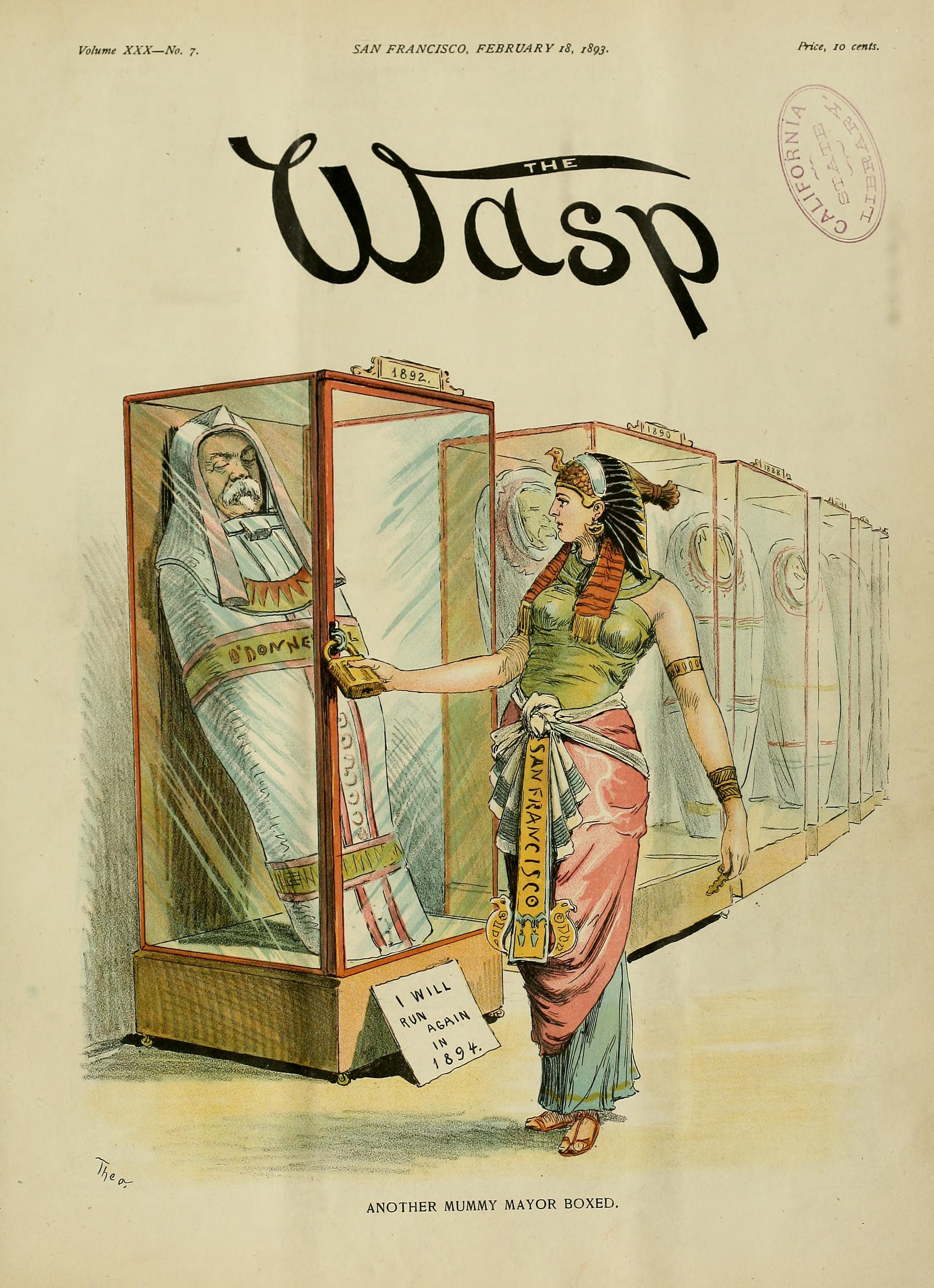
"Another Mummy Mayor Boxed"

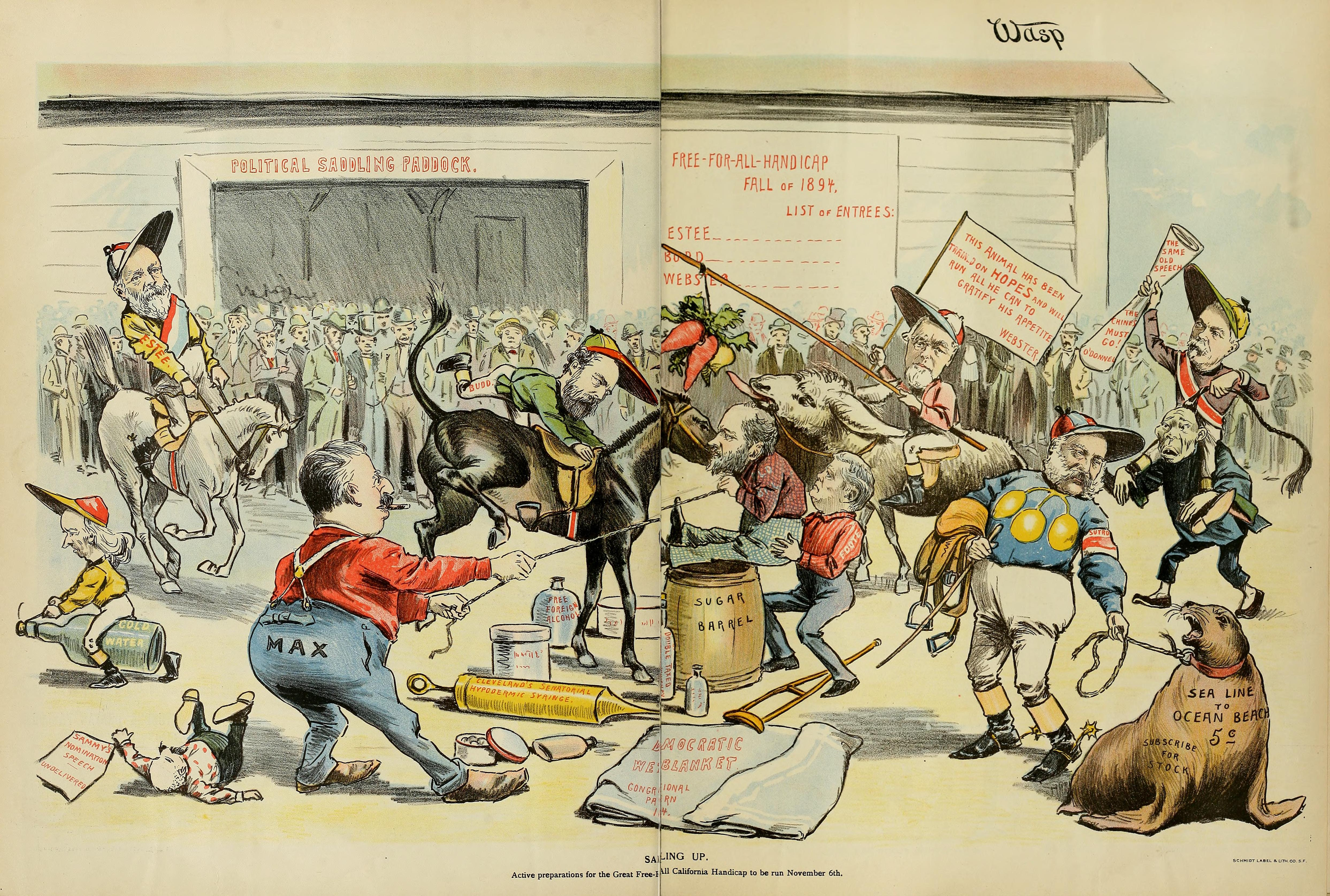
"Saddling Up"

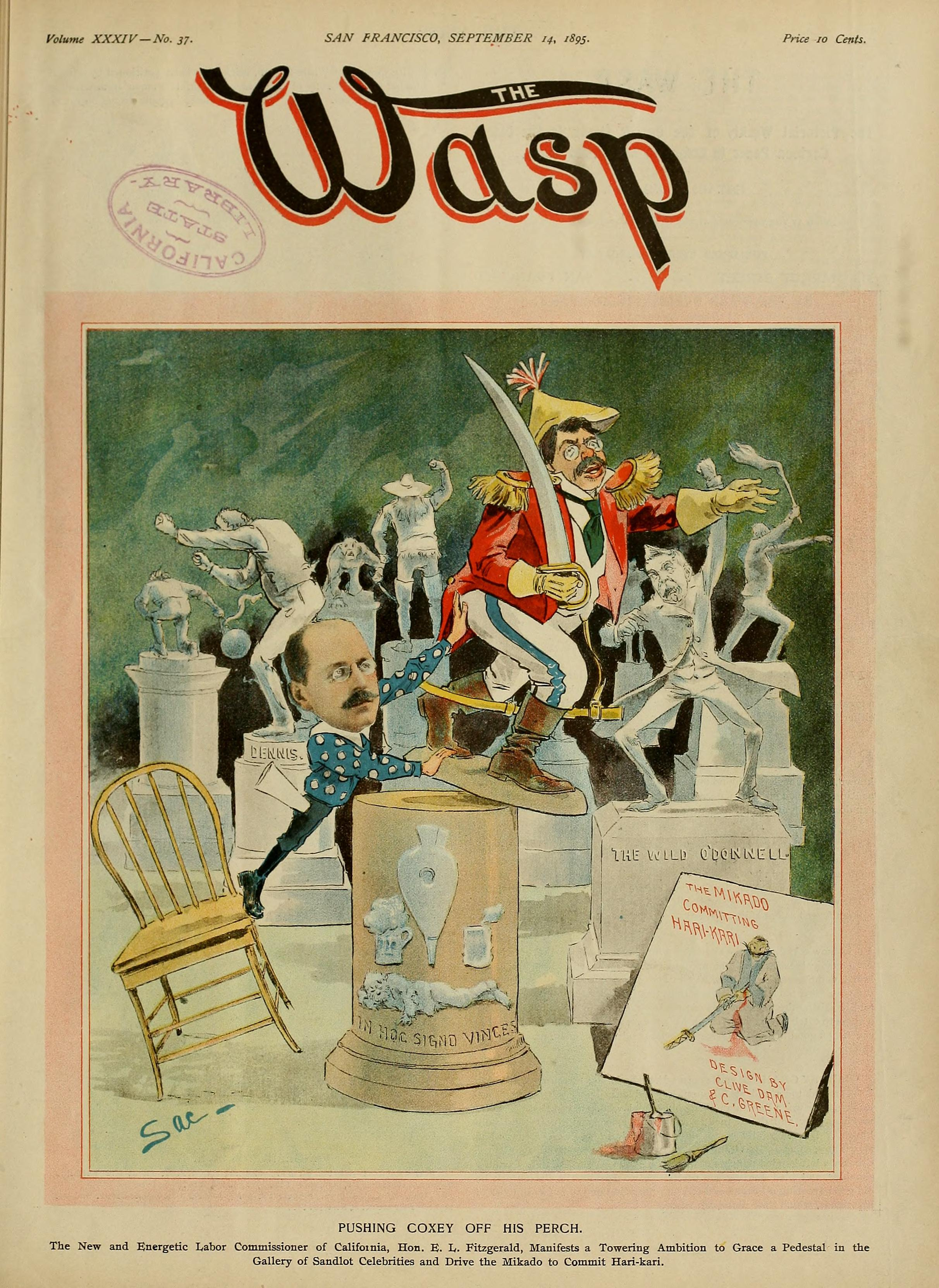
"Pushing Coxey Off His Perch"
