= Robert Waterman (politician) =

American politician

Robert Whitney Waterman
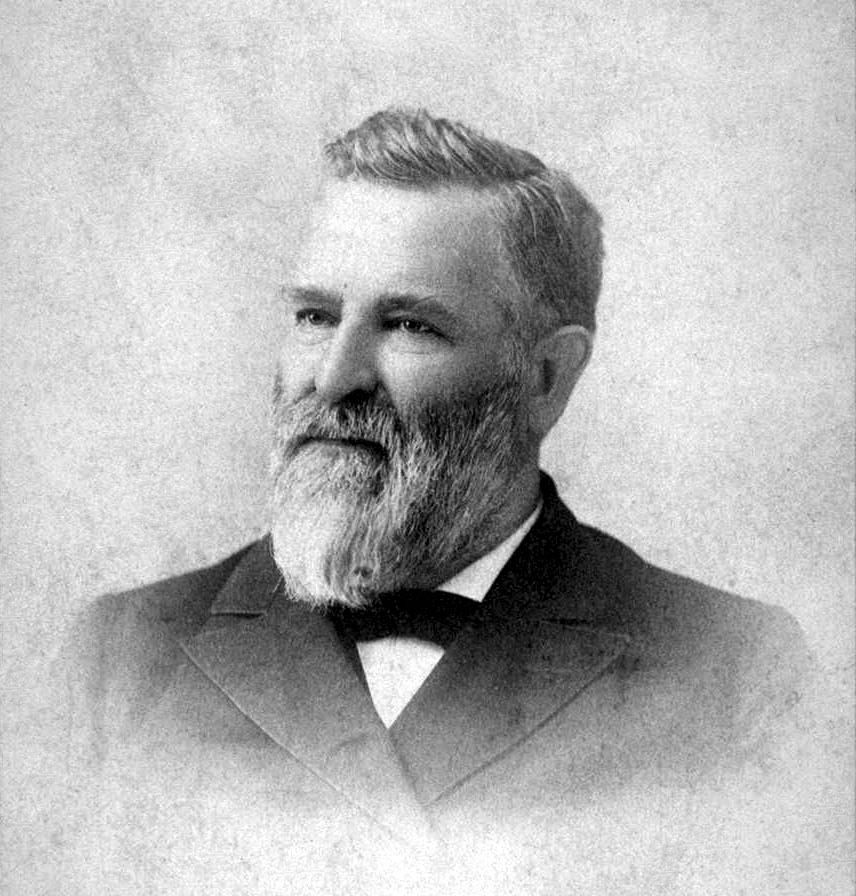
- Portrait by I. W. Taber

17th Governor of California
- In office September 12, 1887 – January 8, 1891
- Lieutenant: Stephen M. White
- Preceded by: Washington Bartlett
- Succeeded by: Henry Markham

17th Lieutenant Governor of California
- In office January 8, 1887 – September 12, 1887
- Governor: Washington Bartlett
- Preceded by: John Daggett
- Succeeded by: Stephen M. White

Personal details
- Born: December 15, 1826 Fairfield, New York, US
- Died: April 12, 1891 (aged 64) San Diego, California, US
- Party: Republican
- Spouse: Jane Gardner
- Children: 7

Robert Whitney Waterman (December 15, 1826 – April 12, 1891) was an American politician and businessman who was the 17th governor of California from 1887 to 1891. He was also the 17th lieutenant governor of California in 1887. He was involved in gold and silver mining and owned the Rancho Cuyamaca in California.

== Early years ==
Waterman was born on December 15, 1826, in Fairfield, New York, to John Dean Waterman and Mary Graves Waldo. His middle name derives from the second wife (Clarissa Dwight Whitney) of his maternal grandfather. He had seven siblings: James Sears, John Calvin, Henry Franklin, Charlotte Judith, Mary, Charles, Caroline Waldo, and Theodore Francis.

== Career ==
Waterman moved to Newbury, Illinois, when he was thirteen to join one of his brothers as a clerk. Later he was a store clerk and postmaster in Geneva, Illinois. In 1850, he sold his assets and headed to California. He traveled with F.A. Park, and befriended Brigham Young in Salt Lake City along the way. On arrival in California, he joined one of his brothers prospecting near the South Fork Feather River on Oregon Creek.

In 1851, Waterman returned to his family in Wilmington, Illinois, and became a successful grain dealer. He helped form the Illinois Republican party in 1854 and published the Wilmington Independent newspaper. In 1856, he was one of two Illinois delegates to the first Republican National Convention in Philadelphia. The other was Abraham Lincoln. In the 1860 presidential election Waterman played a key role in delivering Illinois to Lincoln.

In 1873, Waterman went back to California and became a machinery salesman in Redwood City. In 1874, he moved to San Bernardino. In 1880, while living in San Bernardino, Waterman discovered a silver mine with John Porter a few miles north of Barstow, then called Grapevine. In 1881, he formed a mining partnership with Porter called Waterman and Porter, with 3/4 of the interest owned by Waterman. A stamp mill settlement about four miles (6 km) away was named Waterman. The Southern Pacific Railroad came through Waterman in 1882 and 100 men were employed at the mill and mine. The mine produced 40,000 tons of ore worth $1.7 million before it closed in 1887 due to a decline in silver prices.

In 1886, Waterman purchased Rancho Cuyamaca in San Diego County, including California's Stonewall Jackson gold mine. His operation of the mine netted him $500 a day. On the Cuyamaca Ranch, Waterman raised cattle and helped build the San Diego, Cuyamaca, and Eastern Railroad (now the La Mesa branch of the San Diego and Arizona Eastern Railway).

He was elected lieutenant governor in 1886 as a Republican, and became governor on September 12, 1887, upon the death of Democratic governor Washington Bartlett. The 1886 election was the first split between the two posts in California's history.

During his governorship, the "Waterman Rifles" militia, named in his honor as a prior resident, was authorized for San Bernardino. In 1889, possibly at Waterman's urging, the 300-acre (120 ha) Harlem tract in Patton was chosen for the first Southern California Insane Asylum. It opened in 1893 and would become Patton State Hospital; the facility's location is now in the Highland area of San Bernardino. Waterman served on the University of California Board of Regents as an ex officio member as both lieutenant governor and governor. He strongly supported the 1890 creation of Yosemite National Park.

The question of whether to divide California was a major issue in Waterman's term. His nickname was "Old Honesty": he would not tolerate drunkenness, overspending, nor dishonesty, and vowed to run the state as a business. He chastised the legislature for having 228 clerks when only 35 were authorized.

Waterman later in life

Though he served out the remainder of Bartlett's term, Waterman's poor health caused him not to seek a full term in 1890. After his governorship ended on January 8, 1891, he moved to San Diego, where he purchased for $17,000 a Queen Anne-style house built in 1889 at 2408 First Avenue, now known as the Long-Waterman Mansion. Waterman only enjoyed his new home for a very short time; he died on April 12, 1891, just three months after leaving office. He was buried in San Diego's Mount Hope Cemetery.

== Family life ==
Waterman married Jane Gardner on September 29, 1847, in Belvidere, Illinois. His children were:

- Frank G. Waterman (born September 12, 1848, in Belvidere, Illinois; died August 20, 1853, in Wilmington, Illinois)
- Mary Pamela Waterman (born April 9, 1850, in Belvidere, Illinois; married Dr. Hyland W. Rice (1847-1884), who became San Bernardino County's Public Administrator, January 15, 1872; died November 3, 1925, in Cambridge, Massachusetts)
- James Sears Waterman (born August 22, 1852, in Wilmington, Illinois; married Sara Clifford Brown (1852-1921), December 15, 1902; died January 19, 1930, in Riverside, California)
- Helen Jane Waterman (born December 18, 1856, in Wilmington, Illinois; died October 14, 1945, in Berkeley, California)
- Waldo Sprague Waterman (born February 1, 1860, in Wilmington, Illinois; married Hazel Emma Wood (1865-1948), who became a famous architect, April 11, 1889; died February 23, 1903, in San Diego, California)
- Anna Charlotte Waterman (born April 2, 1866, in Wilmington, Illinois; married Irving M. Scott, Jr. (1862-1952), September 29, 1891; died January 6, 1950, in Berkeley, California)
- Abbie Louisa Waterman (born February 21, 1869, in Wilmington, Illinois; died April 19, 1941, in Berkeley, California)

== Legacy ==
After Robert Waterman's death, the U.S. Supreme Court ruled in the case of Waterman v. Alden, reported at 143 U.S. 196 (1892). This case involved the will of Waterman's brother, James S. Waterman of Sycamore, Illinois, who died July 19, 1883, without descendants. On May 14, 1881, Robert Waterman agreed in writing to give his brother within 12 months on demand 24/100ths of mining property in California. Robert Waterman testified that the value was $1,000,000 at the time. James Waterman advanced $25,000-$30,000 to the Waterman Porter partnership, part of which was repaid before James' death. James also held five promissory notes dated late 1881, for $10,000, payable from February to March 1882 at 8 percent per annum interest. The notes were transferred by Robert Waterman to Philander M. Alden and George S. Robinson, citizens of Illinois and executors of James' estate. The Court ruled that the will did not include the notes.

Today, Waterman Avenue, Waterman Gardens, and Waterman Canyon, all in San Bernardino, are still named for Robert Waterman, as well as Waterman Road at the western margin of Barstow, south of State Route 58 and north of the Mojave River.

His papers and photographs are in the Bancroft Library at the University of California, Berkeley and the San Diego History Center.

Political offices
Preceded by John Daggett	Lieutenant Governor of California; 1887	Succeeded by Stephen M. White
Preceded by Washington Bartlett	Governor of California; 1887–1891	Succeeded by Henry Markham
