= Morris M. Estee =

American politician

Morris Estee
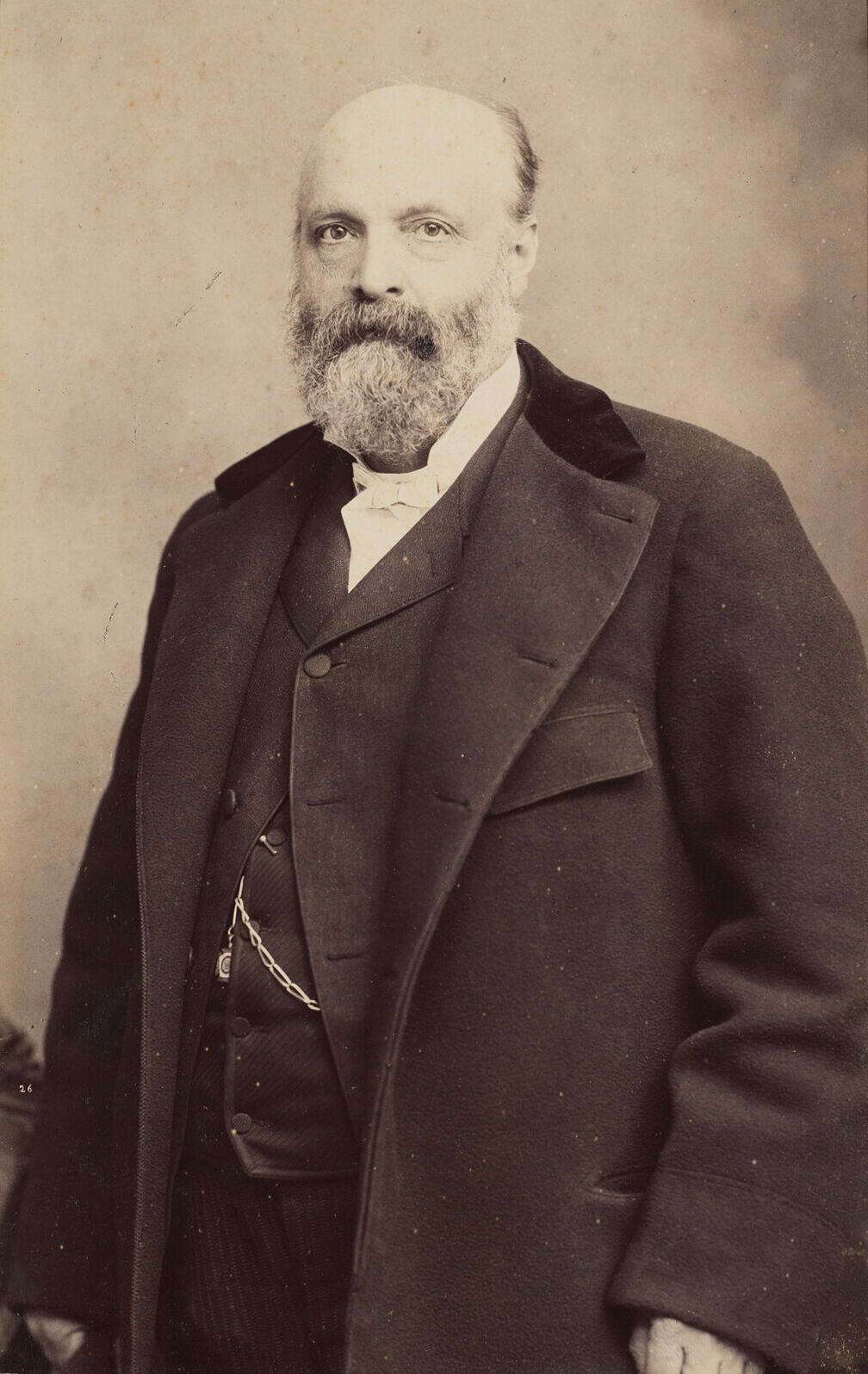
- Portrait by Brady, c. 1889–1890

Judge of the United States District Court for the Territory of Hawaii
- In office June 2, 1900 – October 27, 1903
- Appointed by: William McKinley
- Preceded by: Seat established by 56 Stat. 222
- Succeeded by: Sanford B. Dole

Delegate to the Second Constitutional Convention of California
- In office September 28, 1878 – March 3, 1879
- Preceded by: Office established
- Succeeded by: Office abolished
- Constituency: 1st congressional district

20th Speaker of the California State Assembly
- In office December 1873 – March 1874
- Preceded by: Thomas Bowles Shannon
- Succeeded by: Gideon J. Carpenter

Member of the California State Assembly
- In office December 1, 1873 – December 6, 1875
- Preceded by: Multi-member district
- Succeeded by: Multi-member district
- Constituency: 8th district
- In office December 7, 1863 – December 4, 1865
- Preceded by: Multi-member district
- Succeeded by: Multi-member district
- Constituency: 16th district

District Attorney of Sacramento County
- In office 1863–1866

Personal details
- Born: Morris March Estee; November 23, 1833 Pennsylvania, U.S.
- Died: October 27, 1903 (aged 69) Honolulu, Territory of Hawaii, U.S.
- Party: Republican
- Other political affiliations: People's Independent (1873–1875)
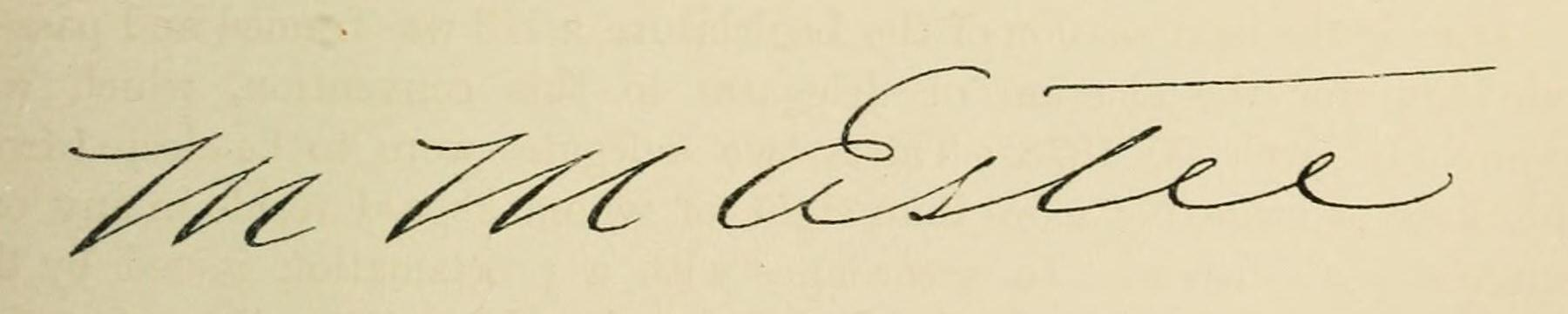
- Signature

Morris March Estee (November 23, 1833 – October 27, 1903) was an American lawyer and politician who served in the California State Assembly from 1863 to 1865 and again from 1873 to 1875, serving as speaker of the Assembly during his second term, in addition to several other offices. He was the Republican nominee for Governor of California in 1882 and 1894, losing both races.

== Biography ==
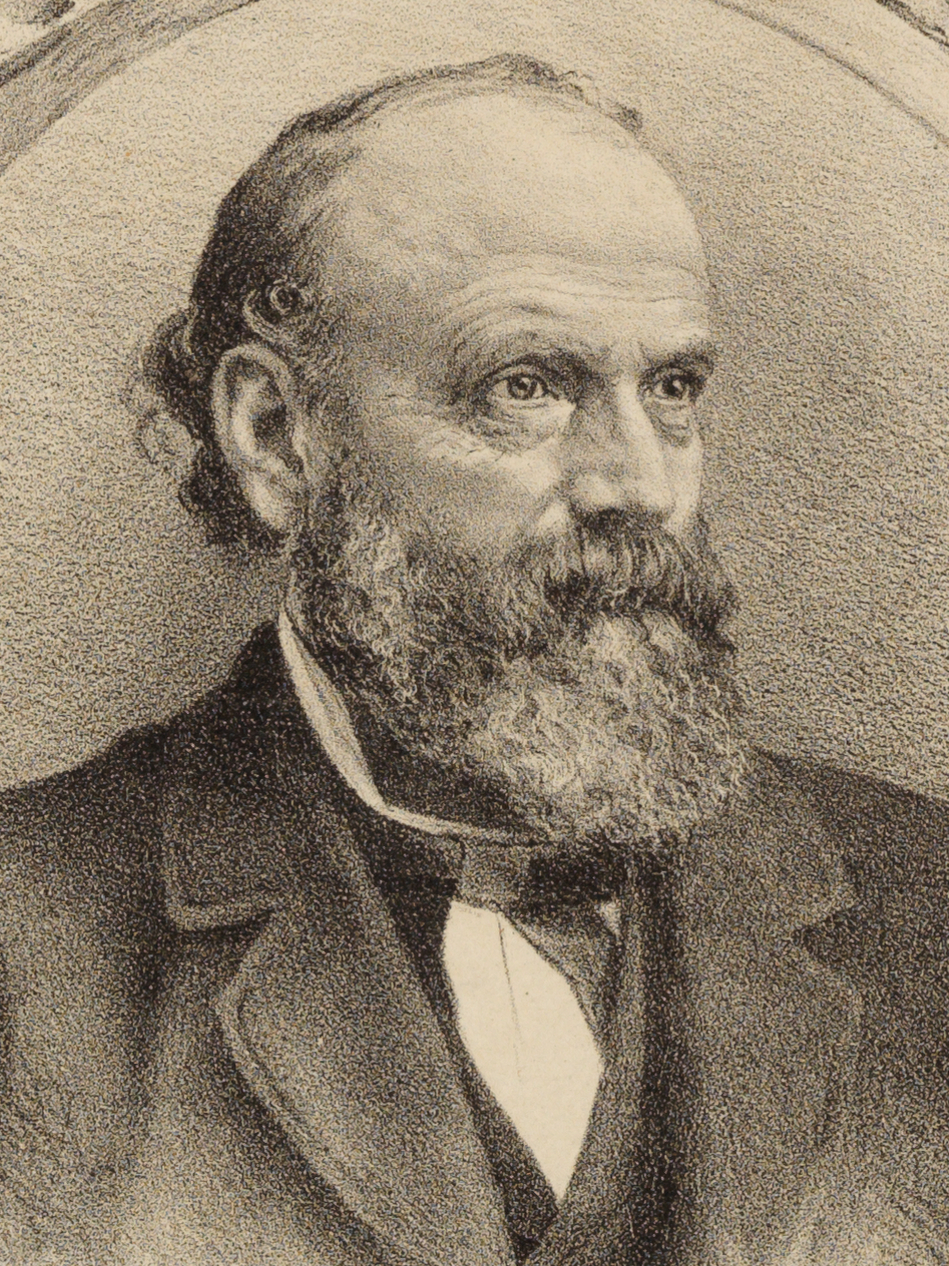
Engraving by Britton & Rey from a photograph by G. D. Morse, 1882

Estee was born in Pennsylvania but spent his young adult life in Sacramento from 1857 to 1859. His business card read: M.M.Estee, Attorney and Counselor at Law, Office: No 88 J Street, bet, Third and Fourth, (South Side,) Sacramento. He was elected in 1862 to the California State Assembly, one of five members representing the 16th District. From 1863 to 1866 he was District Attorney for Sacramento County.

In 1866 he moved to San Francisco, and practiced with a number of partners including John Henry Boalt. In 1873 he was reelected to the Assembly, one of 12 members representing the San Francisco portion of the 8th District, and he was Speaker of the Assembly from 1873 to 1874.

Estee ran twice as a Republican for Governor of California. In his first run in 1882, Estee was defeated by Democrat George Stoneman. His second and final run in 1894 placed him against James Budd, who also defeated him. Estee also ran twice for U.S. Senate, losing to Democrat James T. Farley in 1877 and fellow Republican Charles N. Felton in 1891. On June 2, 1900, he was appointed the first US Federal District Court judge for the Territory of Hawaii. He died in Honolulu on October 27, 1903, at the age of 69.

Party political offices
Preceded by George Clement Perkins	Republican nominee for Governor of California; 1882	Succeeded by John Franklin Swift
Preceded by Henry Markham	Republican nominee for Governor of California; 1894	Succeeded by Henry Gage
Political offices
Preceded by Five members	California State Assemblyman, 16th District; 1863 (with four others)	Succeeded by Five members
Preceded by Twelve members	California State Assemblyman, 8th District (San Francisco seat); 1873-1875 (with eleven others)	Succeeded by John Garretson
Preceded by Thomas B. Shannon	Speaker of the California State Assembly; December 1873–March 1874	Succeeded by Gideon J. Carpenter
Legal offices
Preceded by Seat established by 56 Stat. 222	United States District Court Judge; 1900–1903	Succeeded by Sanford B. Dole
