= 1894 California gubernatorial election =

- November 6, 1894
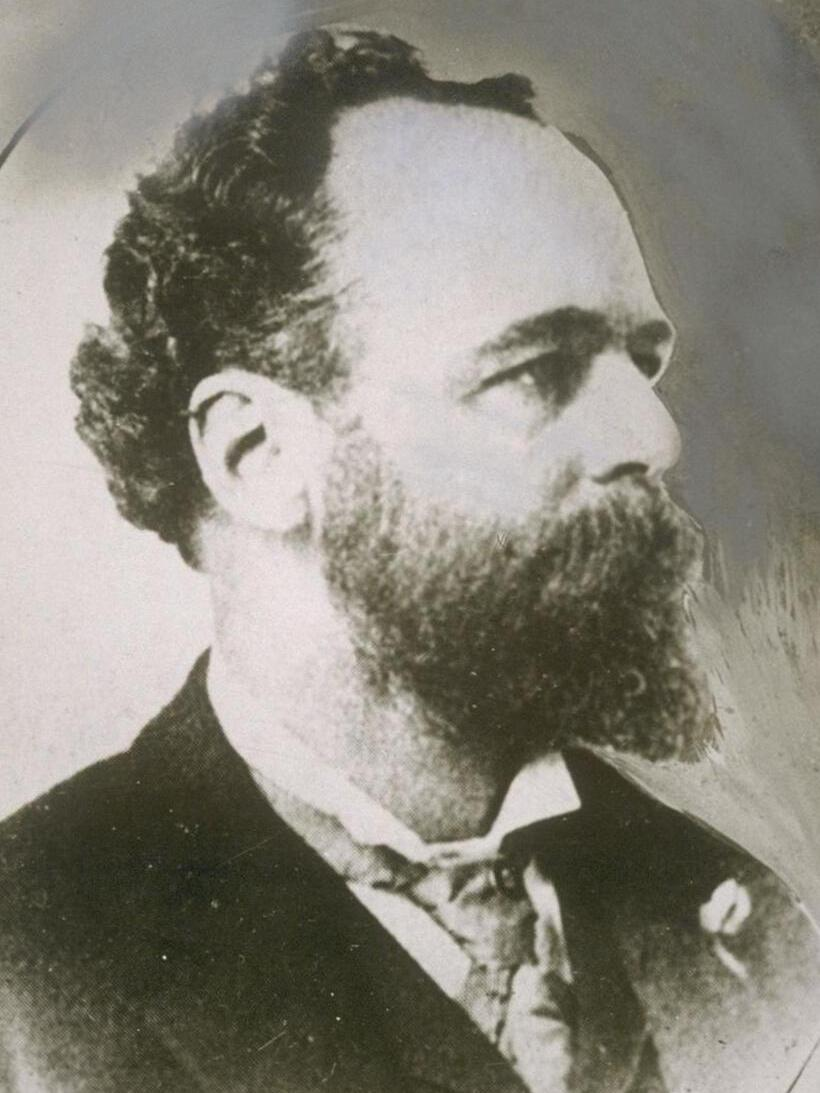

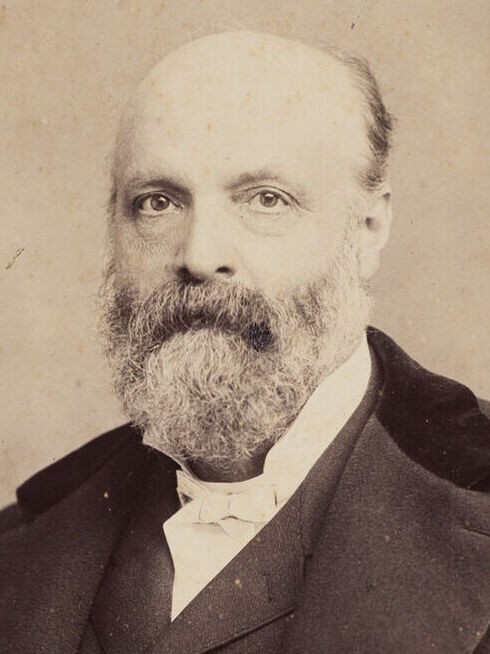

Nominee	James Budd	Morris M. Estee	J. V. Webster
Party	Democratic	Republican	Populist
Popular vote	111,944	110,748	51,304
Percentage	39.34%	38.92%	18.03%
- County results Budd: 30–40% 40–50% 50–60% Estee: 30–40% 40–50% 50–60% 60–70% Webster: 30–40% Tie
Governor before election
Henry Markham
Republican
Elected Governor
James Budd
Democratic

The 1894 California gubernatorial election was held on November 6, 1894, to elect the governor of California. Democratic former Congressman James Budd narrowly defeated Republican lawyer Morris M. Estee. Estee had previously run for governor in 1882, losing the prior election in a landslide. This was the seventh time in the previous eight gubernatorial elections that the incumbent party was ousted from the governorship.

This was the last election until 1938 in which a Democrat was elected Governor of California.

== Results ==
California gubernatorial election, 1894
Party	Candidate	Votes	%	±%
Democratic	James Budd	111,944	39.34%	−7.08%
Republican	Morris M. Estee	110,738	38.92%	−10.65%
Populist	J. V. Webster	51,304	18.03%	+18.03%
Prohibition	Henry French	10,561	3.71%	−0.28%
	Scattering	1	0.00%	
Majority		1,206	0.42%	
Total votes		284,548	100.00%	
Democratic gain from Republican				

=== Results by county ===
County	James Budd Democratic		Morris M. Estee Republican		J. V. Webster People's		Henry French Prohibition		Scattering Write-in		Margin		Total votes cast
County	#	%	#	%	#	%	#	%	#	%	#	%	Total votes cast
Alameda	6,786	33.79%	8,150	40.58%	4,531	22.56%	616	3.07%	0	0.00%	-1,364	-6.79%	20,083
Alpine	19	19.39%	68	69.39%	10	10.20%	1	1.02%	0	0.00%	-49	-50.00%	98
Amador	1,172	44.23%	1,172	44.23%	235	8.87%	71	2.68%	0	0.00%	0	0.00%	2,650
Butte	1,685	37.00%	1,904	41.81%	837	18.38%	128	2.81%	0	0.00%	-219	-4.81%	4,554
Calaveras	1,154	40.71%	1,344	47.41%	326	11.50%	11	0.39%	0	0.00%	-190	-6.70%	2,835
Colusa	1,136	54.04%	575	27.35%	331	15.75%	60	2.85%	0	0.00%	561	26.69%	2,102
Contra Costa	1,278	37.15%	1,602	46.57%	488	14.19%	72	2.09%	0	0.00%	-324	-9.42%	3,440
Del Norte	215	31.02%	238	34.34%	230	33.19%	10	1.44%	0	0.00%	-8 (Note: Margin over Webster)	-1.15%	693
El Dorado	1,048	40.18%	1,020	39.11%	488	18.71%	52	1.99%	0	0.00%	28	1.07%	2,608
Fresno	2,405	34.28%	2,302	32.81%	1,952	27.82%	357	5.09%	0	0.00%	103	1.47%	7,016
Glenn	637	42.78%	492	33.04%	331	22.23%	29	1.95%	0	0.00%	145	9.74%	1,489
Humboldt	1,436	26.34%	1,961	35.98%	1,962	35.99%	92	1.69%	0	0.00%	-1 (Note: Margin over Estee)	-0.01%	5,451
Inyo	228	26.15%	476	54.59%	124	14.22%	44	5.05%	0	0.00%	-248	-28.44%	872
Kern	1,396	40.28%	1,308	37.74%	693	19.99%	69	1.99%	0	0.00%	88	2.54%	3,466
Kings	598	33.46%	696	38.95%	400	22.38%	93	5.20%	0	0.00%	-98	-5.48%	1,787
Lake	574	37.76%	494	32.50%	394	25.92%	58	3.82%	0	0.00%	80	5.26%	1,520
Lassen	377	35.37%	421	39.49%	249	23.36%	19	1.78%	0	0.00%	-44	-4.13%	1,066
Los Angeles	7,619	30.51%	11,255	45.07%	4,110	16.46%	1,991	7.97%	0	0.00%	-3,636	-14.56%	24,975
Madera	704	44.14%	503	31.54%	341	21.38%	47	2.95%	0	0.00%	201	12.60%	1,595
Marin	865	38.07%	1,070	47.10%	310	13.64%	27	1.19%	0	0.00%	-205	-9.02%	2,272
Mariposa	489	42.74%	404	35.31%	240	20.98%	11	0.96%	0	0.00%	85	7.43%	1,144
Mendocino	1,542	36.55%	1,538	36.45%	945	22.40%	194	4.60%	0	0.00%	4	0.09%	4,219
Merced	692	35.25%	594	30.26%	615	31.33%	62	3.16%	0	0.00%	77	3.92%	1,963
Modoc	448	40.25%	337	30.28%	289	25.97%	39	3.50%	0	0.00%	111	9.97%	1,113
Mono	190	34.23%	306	55.14%	57	10.27%	2	0.36%	0	0.00%	-116	-20.90%	555
Monterey	1,414	34.32%	1,583	34.82%	983	23.86%	140	3.40%	0	0.00%	-169	-4.10%	4,120
Napa	1,364	37.43%	1,903	52.22%	282	7.74%	95	2.61%	0	0.00%	-539	-14.79%	3,644
Nevada	1,496	34.15%	1,510	34.47%	1,242	28.35%	133	3.04%	0	0.00%	-14	-0.32%	4,381
Orange	949	28.69%	1,469	44.41%	526	15.90%	364	11.00%	0	0.00%	-520	-15.72%	3,308
Placer	1,357	35.74%	1,609	42.38%	625	16.46%	206	5.43%	0	0.00%	-252	-6.64%	3,797
Plumas	427	35.76%	588	49.25%	164	13.74%	15	1.26%	0	0.00%	-161	-13.48%	1,194
Riverside	817	22.20%	1,683	45.73%	675	18.34%	505	13.72%	0	0.00%	-866	-23.53%	3,680
Sacramento	3,183	33.28%	3,712	38.81%	2,440	25.51%	229	2.39%	0	0.00%	-529	-5.53%	9,564
San Benito	765	42.08%	685	37.68%	336	18.48%	32	1.76%	0	0.00%	80	4.40%	1,818
San Bernardino	1,360	24.73%	2,323	42.24%	1,236	22.47%	581	10.56%	0	0.00%	-963	-17.51%	5,500
San Diego	1,897	26.63%	2,848	39.98%	1,978	27.77%	401	5.63%	0	0.00%	-870	-12.21%	7,124
San Francisco	32,069	53.77%	20,615	34.56%	6,459	10.83%	500	0.84%	0	0.00%	11,454	19.20%	59,643
San Joaquin	3,518	47.97%	2,557	34.87%	1,037	14.14%	222	3.03%	0	0.00%	961	13.10%	7,334
San Luis Obispo	1,096	27.21%	1,476	36.64%	1,329	32.99%	127	3.15%	0	0.00%	-147	-3.65%	4,028
San Mateo	1,096	44.02%	1,193	47.91%	152	6.10%	49	1.97%	0	0.00%	-97	-3.90%	2,490
Santa Barbara	1,191	32.52%	1,534	41.89%	673	18.38%	264	7.21%	0	0.00%	-343	-9.37%	3,662
Santa Clara	4,449	38.16%	4,318	37.04%	1,858	15.94%	1,032	8.85%	1	0.01%	131	1.12%	11,658
Santa Cruz	1,274	28.88%	1,669	37.84%	1,219	27.64%	249	5.64%	0	0.00%	-395	-8.95%	4,411
Shasta	896	27.75%	1,069	33.11%	1,149	35.58%	115	3.56%	0	0.00%	-80	-2.47%	3,229
Sierra	466	35.63%	739	56.50%	90	6.88%	13	0.99%	0	0.00%	-273	-20.87%	1,308
Siskiyou	1,279	39.50%	1,413	43.64%	502	15.50%	44	1.36%	0	0.00%	-134	-4.14%	3,238
Solano	2,251	43.07%	2,256	43.17%	625	11.96%	94	1.80%	0	0.00%	-5	-0.10%	5,226
Sonoma	2,832	37.92%	3,316	44.40%	1,091	14.61%	230	3.08%	0	0.00%	-484	-6.48%	7,469
Stanislaus	1,329	52.14%	851	33.39%	284	11.14%	85	3.33%	0	0.00%	478	18.75%	2,549
Sutter	720	42.03%	772	45.07%	163	9.52%	58	3.39%	0	0.00%	-52	-3.04%	1,713
Tehama	860	36.83%	866	37.09%	557	23.85%	52	2.23%	0	0.00%	-6	-0.26%	2,335
Trinity	407	40.78%	450	45.09%	120	12.02%	21	2.10%	0	0.00%	-43	-4.31%	998
Tulare	1,802	37.31%	1,346	27.87%	1,536	31.80%	146	3.02%	0	0.00%	266	5.51%	4,830
Tuolumne	1,138	55.59%	619	30.24%	217	10.60%	73	3.57%	0	0.00%	519	25.35%	2,047
Ventura	962	33.38%	1,270	44.07%	486	16.86%	164	5.69%	0	0.00%	-308	-10.69%	2,882
Yolo	1,612	46.39%	1,289	37.09%	444	12.78%	130	3.74%	0	0.00%	323	9.29%	3,475
Yuba	975	41.90%	977	41.99%	338	14.53%	37	1.59%	0	0.00%	-2	-0.09%	2,327
Total	111,944	39.34%	110,738	38.92%	51,304	18.03%	10,561	3.71%	1	0.00%	1,206	0.42%	284,548

==== Counties that flipped from Republican to Democratic ====
- San Joaquin
- Santa Clara

==== Counties that flipped from Democratic to Republican ====
- Butte
- Del Norte
- Lassen
- Siskiyou
- Sonoma
- Tehama

==== Counties that flipped from Republican to People's ====
- Humboldt
- Shasta
