= 1891 United States Senate special election in California =

- March 19, 1891

Majority vote of both houses needed to win
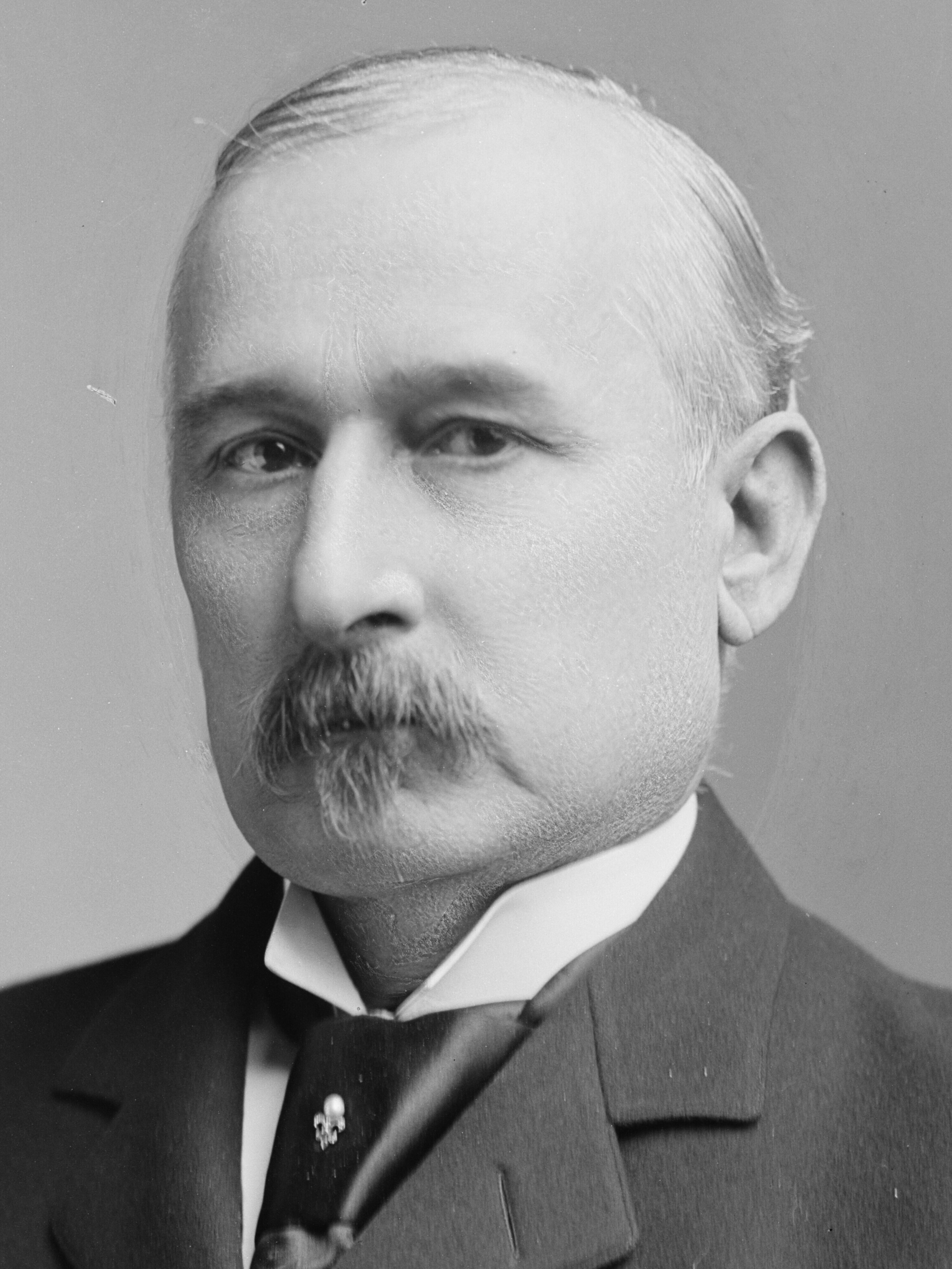

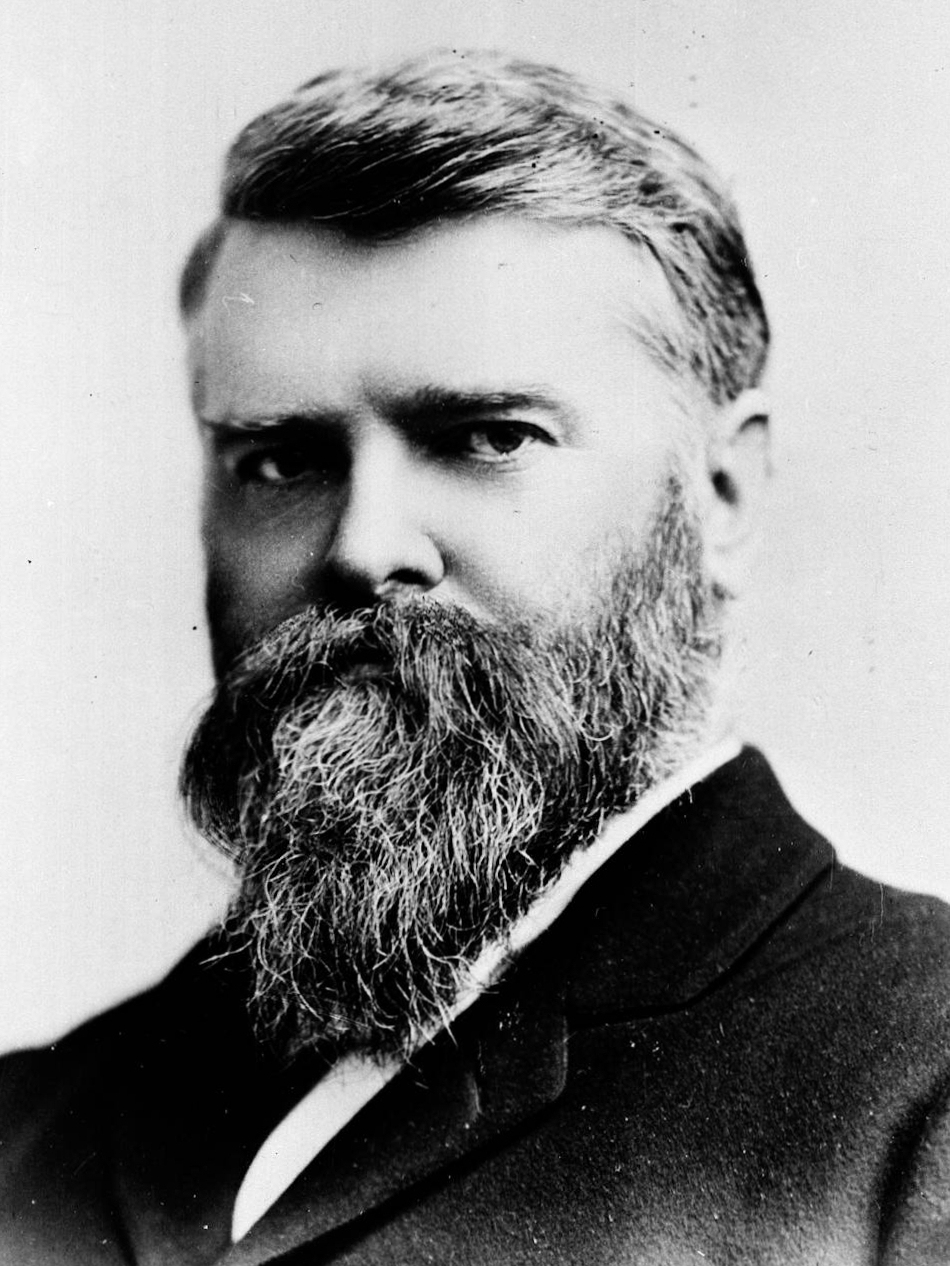

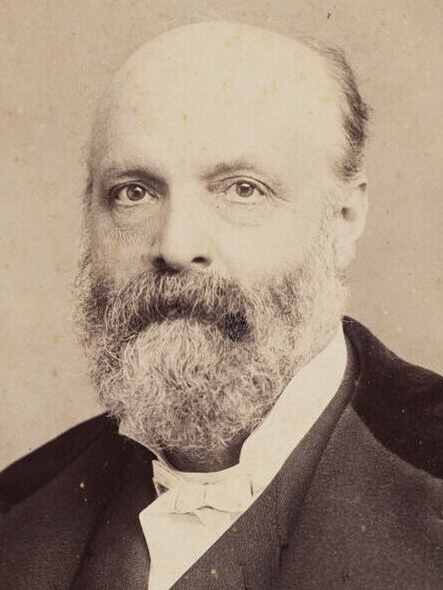
Nominee	Charles N. Felton	Stephen M. White	Morris Estee
Party	Republican	Democratic	Republican
Joint session	73	28	15
Percentage	61.86%	23.72%	12.71%
Senator before election
George Hearst
Democratic
Elected Senator
Charles N. Felton
Republican

The 1891 United States Senate special election in California was held on March 19, 1891, by the California State Legislature to elect a U.S. senator (Class 1) to represent the State of California in the United States Senate. In a special joint session, former Republican Congressman Charles N. Felton was elected over Democratic Lieutenant Governor Stephen M. White and former Republican Speaker of the State Assembly Morris Estee.

== Results ==
Election in the Legislature (joint session)
Party	Candidate	Votes	%
Republican	Charles N. Felton	73	61.86%
Democratic	Stephen M. White	28	23.73%
Republican	Morris Estee	15	12.71%
	Scattering	2	1.69%
Total votes		118	100.00%
