= 1877 United States Senate election in California =

- December 18, 1877

Majority vote of each house needed to win
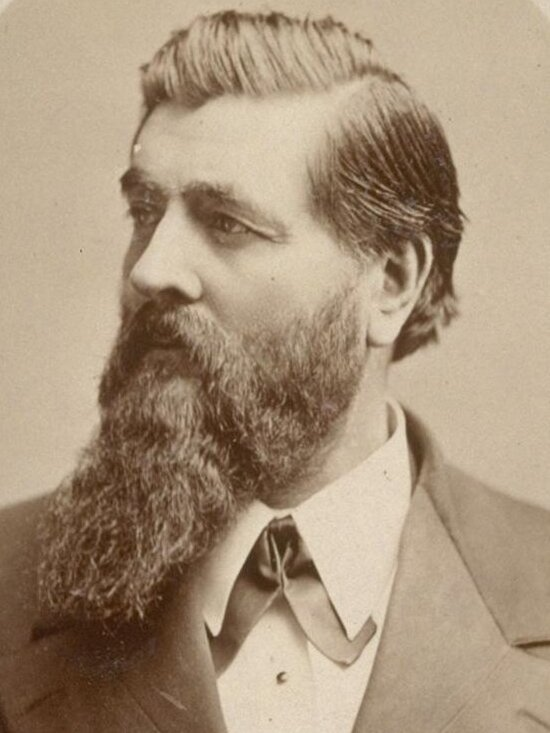

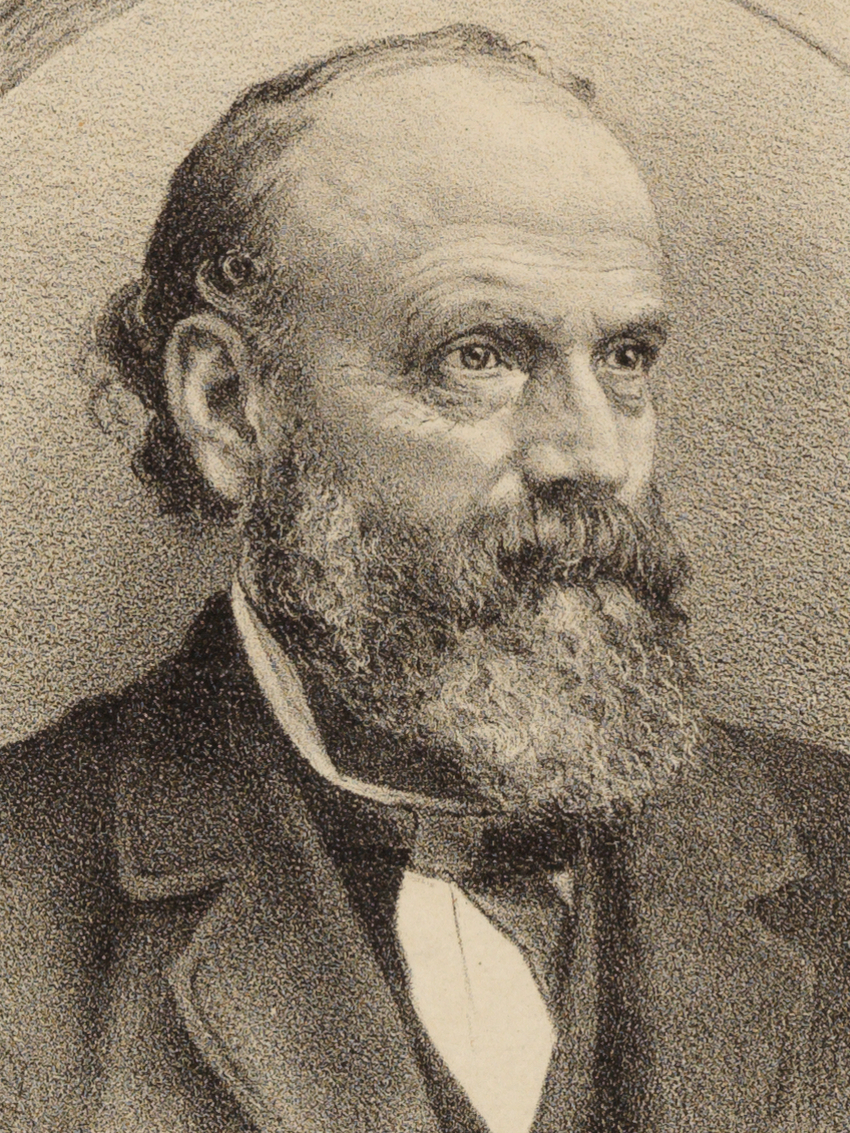
Nominee	James T. Farley	Morris M. Estee
Party	Democratic	Republican
Senate	28	12
Percentage	70.00%	30.00%
House	54	24
Percentage	69.23%	30.77%
Senator before election
Aaron A. Sargent
Republican
Elected Senator
James T. Farley
Democratic

The 1877 United States Senate election in California was held on December 18, 1877, by the California State Legislature to elect a U.S. senator (Class 3) to represent the State of California in the United States Senate. Democratic state senator James T. Farley was elected over Republican State Assemblyman Morris M. Estee.

== Results ==
Election in the Senate
Party	Candidate	Votes	%
Democratic	James T. Farley	28	70.00%
Republican	Morris M. Estee	12	30.00%
Total votes		40	100.00%

Election in the Assembly
Party	Candidate	Votes	%
Democratic	James T. Farley	54	69.23%
Republican	Morris M. Estee	24	30.77%
Total votes		78	100.00%
