= 1886 United States House of Representatives elections in California =

United States House of Representatives elections in California, 1886
- November 2, 1886

All 6 California seats to the United States House of Representatives
	Majority party	Minority party
Party	Republican	Democratic
Last election	5	1
Seats won	4	2
Seat change	▼1	▲1
Popular vote	93,921	91,710
Percentage	48.5%	47.4%
- Election results by district.

The United States House of Representatives elections in California, 1886 was an election for California's delegation to the United States House of Representatives, which occurred as part of the general election of the House of Representatives on November 2, 1886. Democrats gained one district.

== Overview ==
United States House of Representatives elections in California, 1886
Party	Votes	Percentage	Seats
Republican	93,921	48.5%	4
Democratic	91,710	47.4%	2
Prohibition	5,335	2.7%	0
Independent	2,686	1.4%	0
Totals	193,652	100.0%	6

== Delegation composition ==
Pre-election	Seats
Republican-Held	5
Democratic-Held	1

Post-election	Seats
Republican-Held	4
Democratic-Held	2

== Results ==
=== District 1 ===
California's 1st congressional district election, 1886
Party	Candidate	Votes	%
Democratic	Thomas Larkin Thompson	16,499	50.1
Republican	Charles A. Garter	15,526	47.1
Prohibition	L. W. Simmons	849	2.6
Independent	Philip Cowen	80	0.2
Total votes		32,954	100.0
Turnout			
Democratic hold			

=== District 2 ===
California's 2nd congressional district election, 1886
Party	Candidate	Votes	%
Democratic	Marion Biggs	17,667	50.0
Republican	J. C. Campbell	16,594	47.0
Prohibition	W. O. Clark	1,076	3.0
Total votes		35,337	100.0
Turnout			
Democratic gain from Republican			

=== District 3 ===
California's 3rd congressional district election, 1886
Party	Candidate	Votes	%
Republican	Joseph McKenna (incumbent)	15,801	53.0
Democratic	Henry C. McPike	13,277	44.5
Prohibition	W. W. Smith	707	2.4
Independent	W. J. Cuthbertson	32	0.1
Total votes		29,817	100.0
Turnout			
Republican hold			

=== District 4 ===
California's 4th congressional district election, 1886
Party	Candidate	Votes	%
Republican	William W. Morrow (incumbent)	11,413	48.6
Democratic	Frank McCoppin	9,854	42.0
Independent	Charles A. Sumner	2,104	9.0
Prohibition	Robert Thompson	84	0.4
Total votes		23,455	100.0
Turnout			
Republican hold			

=== District 5 ===
California's 5th congressional district election, 1886
Party	Candidate	Votes	%
Republican	Charles N. Felton (incumbent)	16,328	48.8
Democratic	Frank J. Sullivan	16,209	48.4
Independent	Albert E. Redstone	470	1.4
Prohibition	C. Henderson	460	1.4
Total votes		33,467	100.0
Turnout			
Republican hold			

=== District 6 ===
California's 6th congressional district election, 1886
Party	Candidate	Votes	%
Republican	William Vandever	18,259	47.3
Democratic	Joseph D. Lynch	18,204	47.1
Prohibition	W. A. Harris	2,159	5.6
Total votes		38,622	100.0
Turnout			
Republican hold			

== See also ==
- 50th United States Congress
- Political party strength in California
- Political party strength in U.S. states
- United States House of Representatives elections, 1886
