= George Stoneman =

Union Army General and governor of California (1822–1894)

George Stoneman Jr.
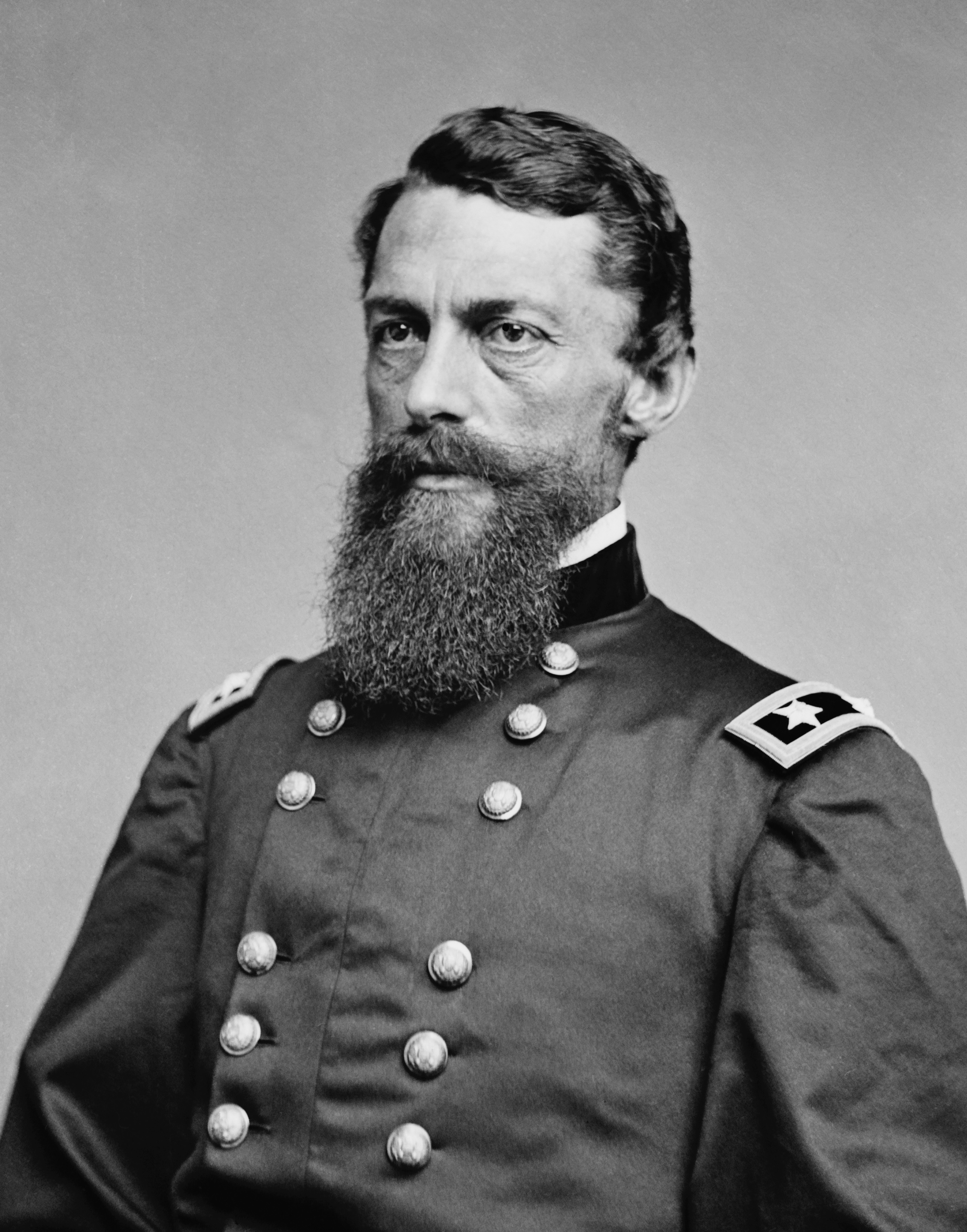
- Portrait by Brady c. 1863–1865

15th Governor of California
- In office January 10, 1883 – January 8, 1887
- Lieutenant: John Daggett
- Preceded by: George C. Perkins
- Succeeded by: Washington Bartlett

Member of the California Railroad Commission from the 3rd district
- In office January 5, 1880 – November 13, 1882
- Preceded by: Office established
- Succeeded by: William W. Foote

Personal details
- Born: August 8, 1822 Busti, New York, U.S.
- Died: September 5, 1894 (aged 72) Buffalo, New York, U.S.
- Party: Democratic
- Other political affiliations: Workingmen's (1879)
- Spouse: Mary Stoneman
- Children: 4
- Relatives: John Thompson Stoneman (brother)

Military service
- Allegiance: United States of America; Union
- Branch/service: United States Army; Union Army
- Years of service: 1846–1871
- Rank: Major General
- Commands: III Corps; Cavalry Corps; XXIII Corps
- Battles/wars: Mexican-American War; Yuma War; American Civil War

George Stoneman Jr. (August 8, 1822 – September 5, 1894) was an American military officer and politician who served as the 15th governor of California from 1883 to 1887.

Stoneman trained at West Point, graduating in 1846, and served in the U.S. Army for 36 years. He was involved in multiple conflicts, including the Mexican–American War, the Yuma War, and the American Civil War. In 1861, Stoneman was promoted to Brigadier General, and was later put in command of the Army of the Potomac's 3rd Infantry Corps, and subsequently the newly created cavalry corps.

At the Battle of Chancellorsville in 1863, under the command of Joseph Hooker, Stoneman failed in an ambitious attempt to penetrate behind enemy lines, getting bogged down at an important river crossing. Hooker placed much of the blame for the Union army's defeat on Stoneman. His sharp criticism may have been in part intended to deflect blame placed on himself for the North's defeat.

While commanding cavalry under William Tecumseh Sherman in Georgia, Stoneman was captured by Confederate soldiers, but soon exchanged. Shortly after the end of the American Civil War, Stoneman commanded occupying troops at Memphis, Tennessee, who were stationed at Fort Pickering. He had turned over control of law enforcement to the civilian government by May 1866, when the Memphis riots broke out and the major black neighborhoods were destroyed. When the city asked for help, he suppressed the rioting with the use of federal troops. He later moved out to California, where he had an estate in the San Gabriel Valley. He was elected as governor of California, serving between 1883 and 1887. He was not nominated a second time.

== Early life and military service ==
Stoneman was born on a family farm in Busti, New York, the first child of ten. His parents were George Stoneman Sr., a lumberman and justice of the peace, and Catherine Rebecca Cheney Aldrich. He studied at the Jamestown Academy and entered the United States Military Academy in 1842; his roommate at West Point was future Confederate General Thomas J. "Stonewall" Jackson. He graduated 33rd in his class of 59 cadets in 1846. One of his fellow graduates was the famous humorist, George H. Derby. Stoneman was commissioned as a second Lieutenant in the Mormon Battalion, which from 1846 to 1847 made the march from Iowa to California, to participate in the Mexican–American War, though by the time the battalion arrived, California was controlled by the United States, and his unit never actually saw combat. Stoneman was assistant quartermaster for the march. Assigned to the 1st U.S. Dragoons, Stoneman was stationed in Sonoma, California from 1849 to 1851. While there, his housemates were Joseph Hooker, who was serving as the assistant adjutant general of the Pacific Division, and Alfred Gibbs and Philip Kearney. He fought in the Yuma War and was responsible for survey parties mapping the Sierra Nevada range for railroad lines. After promotion to captain of the 2nd U.S. Cavalry in March 1855, he served mainly in Texas until 1861.

== Civil War service ==
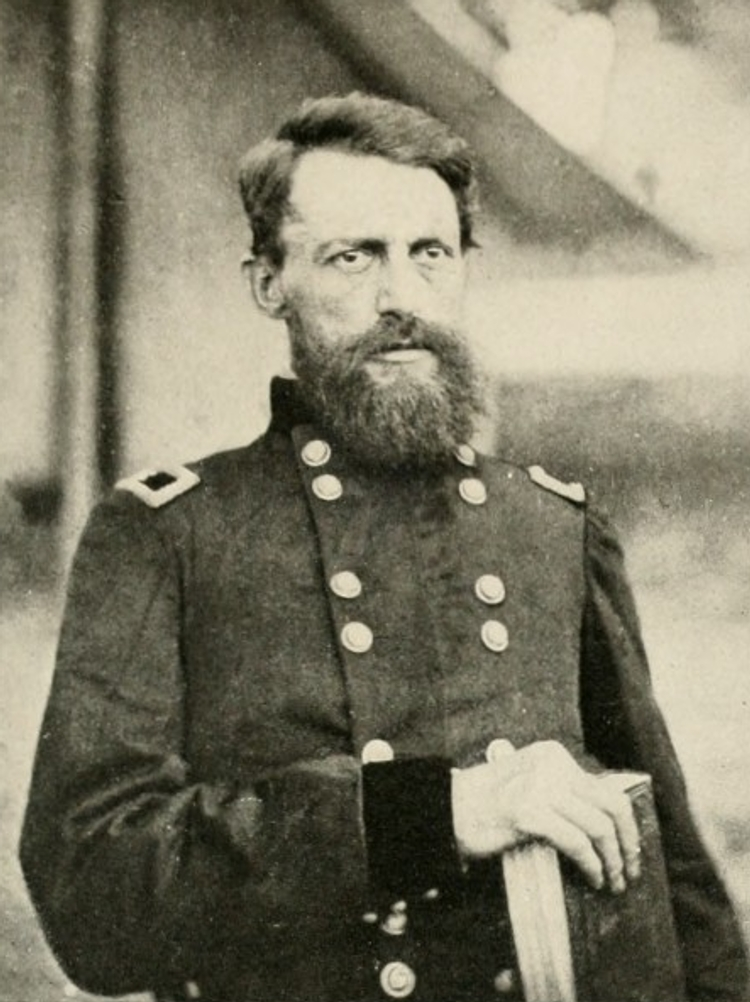
Union Cavalry General George Stoneman

At the start of the Civil War Stoneman was in command of Fort Brown, Texas, and refused the order of Maj. Gen. David E. Twiggs, a southern sympathizer, to surrender to the newly established Confederate authorities there, escaping to the north with most of his command. Returning east, he was reassigned to the 1st US Cavalry and promoted to major on May 9, 1861. Stoneman then served as adjutant to General George McClellan during his campaign in Western Virginia during the summer. After McClellan became commander of the newly formed Army of the Potomac, he assigned Stoneman as his chief of cavalry; Stoneman was promoted to brigadier general of volunteers on August 13. Stoneman had a difficult relationship with McClellan, who did not understand the proper use of cavalry in warfare, relegating it to assignment in small units to infantry brigades.

On November 22, 1861, Stoneman married Mary Oliver Hardisty of Baltimore. They had four children.

Following the failures of the Peninsula campaign, Stoneman was reassigned to the infantry, and received command of the 1st Division of the III Corps on September 10 after its former commander, Maj. Gen. Phil Kearny, had been killed a week earlier. The III Corps remained in Washington, D.C., during the Maryland campaign. On October 30, Stoneman was placed in command of the entire III corps. At Fredericksburg, it formed part of Maj. Gen. Joseph Hooker's Center Grand Division and helped drive back a Confederate assault during the battle. Following Fredericksburg, Hooker became commander of the Army of the Potomac and decided to re-organize the cavalry into a single corps with Stoneman at its head.

=== Stoneman's raids ===
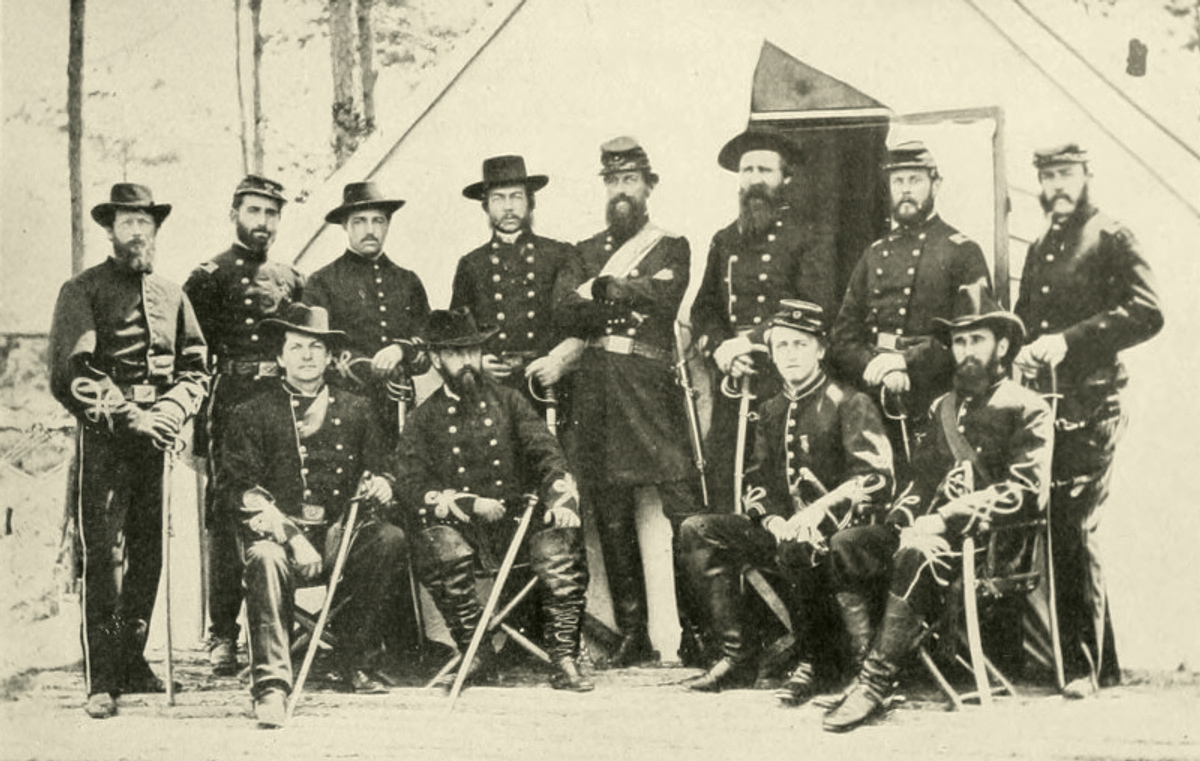
Union General George Stoneman & staff, 1863.

The plan for the Battle of Chancellorsville was strategically daring. Hooker assigned Stoneman a key role in which his Cavalry Corps would raid deeply into Robert E. Lee's rear areas and destroy vital railroad lines and supplies, distracting Lee from Hooker's main assaults. However, Stoneman was a disappointment in this strategic role. The Cavalry Corps got off to a good start in May 1863, but quickly bogged down after crossing the Rapidan River. During the entire battle, Stoneman accomplished little, and Hooker considered him one of the principal reasons for the Union defeat at Chancellorsville. Hooker needed to deflect criticism from himself and relieved Stoneman of his cavalry command, sending him back to Washington, D.C., for medical treatment (chronic hemorrhoids, exacerbated by cavalry service), where in July he became a Chief of the U.S. Cavalry Bureau, a desk job. A large cavalry supply and training depot on the Potomac River was named Camp Stoneman in his honor.

In early 1864, Stoneman was impatient with garrison duty in Washington and requested another field command from his old friend Maj. Gen. John Schofield, who was in command of the Department of the Ohio. Although originally slated for an infantry corps, Stoneman assumed command of the Cavalry Corps of what would be known as the Army of the Ohio. As the army fought in the Atlanta campaign under Maj. Gen. William T. Sherman, Stoneman commanded an unsuccessful raid of the infamous Andersonville Prison. In the course of the raid he and his aide, Myles Keogh were captured by Confederates outside of Macon, Georgia. However, the 5th Indiana Cavalry Regiment under Col. Thomas Butler made a valiant stand, allowing the rest of his forces to retreat. They were surrendered as well, despite protest by Col. Butler. Stoneman became the highest-ranking Union prisoner of war, and he remained prisoner for three months.

Stoneman was exchanged relatively quickly due to the personal request of General Sherman. Following his release, Stoneman was briefly the commander of the Department of the Ohio. In December 1864, Stoneman led a raid through southwestern Virginia. In March 1865, Stoneman took roughly 4,000 troops out of Knoxville, Tennessee, and led them on a raid of Virginia and North Carolina, the intent being to cripple Confederate infrastructure and demoralize the population. Within a week, they had sacked the towns of Hillsville, Asheville, and Christiansburg, among others, and destroyed several bridges, lead mines and railroads.

== Postbellum politics ==
In June 1865, following the end of war, Stoneman was put in command of the Department of Tennessee in occupied Memphis. Stoneman was criticized for inaction in the early days of the 1866 Memphis riots, which may have increased the damage. Stoneman was subject to a congressional investigation, but was exonerated.

Stoneman was assigned to administer the military government in the sub-district of Petersburg, Virginia, and in 1868, he assumed command of the First Military District. A Democrat who was opposed to the radical Reconstruction, Stoneman pursued more moderate policies than the other Military Governors, which garnered him support among white Virginians.

Stoneman mustered out of volunteer service on September 1, 1866, and reverted to the regular army rank of colonel. In 1869, the Army transferred him out west to command the District of Arizona (1869–1870) and subsequently the Department of Arizona (1870–71). Stoneman was relieved of his command due to controversies surrounding his handling of the region's Indians, including the Camp Grant massacre. On August 16, 1871, Stoneman was granted a disability retirement at his brevetted rank of Major General. Three days later, however, President Ulysses S. Grant revoked his disability licence, forcing him to retire at the rank of colonel.

Stoneman was a First Class Companion of the California Commandery of the Military Order of the Loyal Legion of the United States.

== California ==
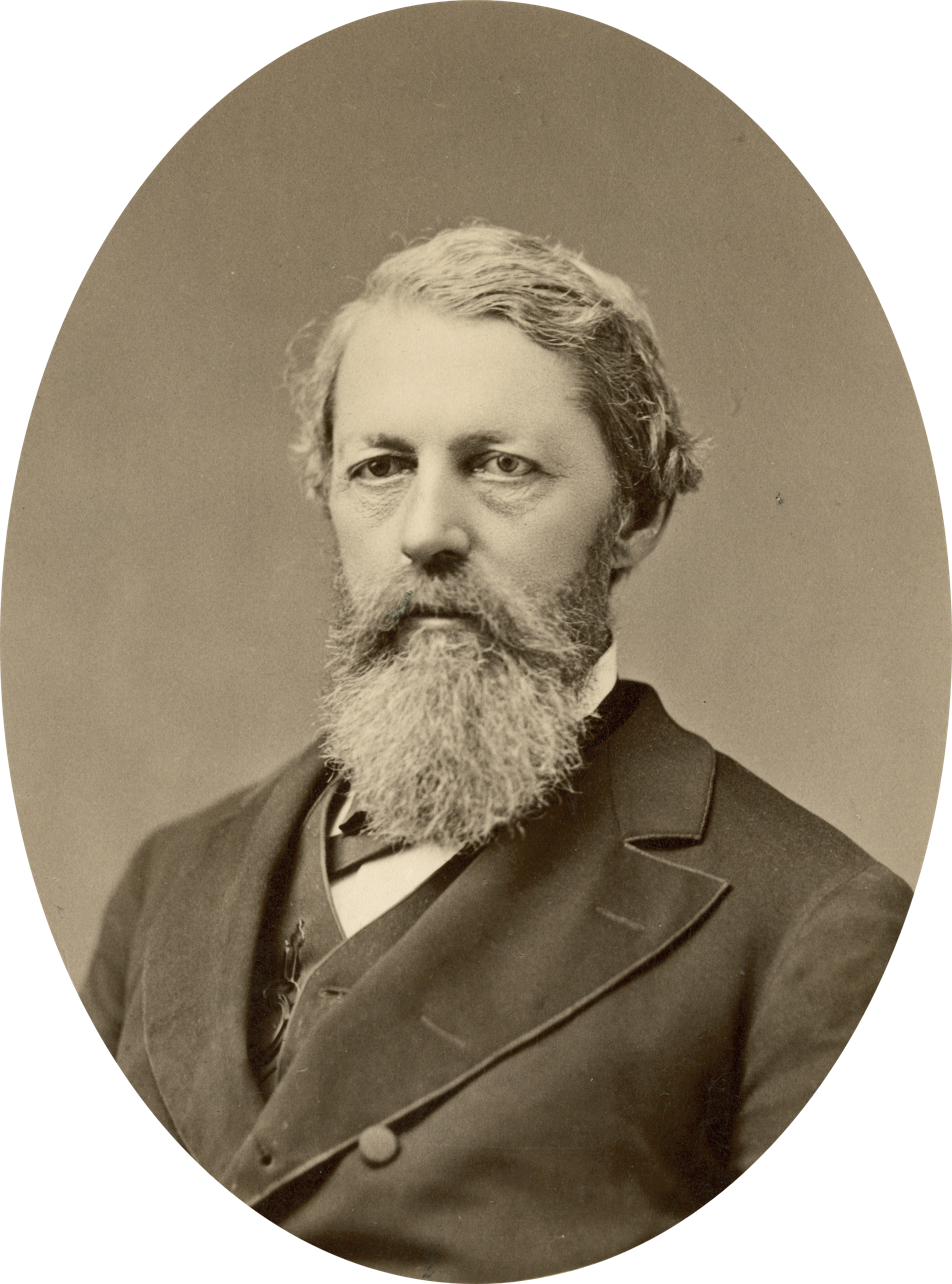
Portrait by I. W. Taber c. 1882

Stoneman moved to California, the place of which he had dreamed since his service as a young officer before the war. He and his wife settled in the San Gabriel Valley on a 400-acre (160 ha) estate called Los Robles, which is now a California Historical Landmark. He was appointed to the California Transportation Commission in 1876. In 1879 he was elected to the California Railroad Commission with the support of the Democratic, Workingmen's, and New Constitution parties. He was the only anti-railroad member of the commission; the other two, Charles J. Beerstecher and J. S. Cone, steered the commission in a pro-railroad direction. However, the inexperience and poor attendance of all three men contributed to the commission's inaction.

"The Convict's Best Friend" a political cartoon published in The Wasp mocking Stoneman for his pardoning of convicts, December 13, 1884

In 1882, Stoneman was elected governor of California as a Democrat and served a single four-year term. During his tenure, he advocated controlling the rates and limiting the power of the Southern Pacific Railroad; however, he was unsuccessful in his efforts against the railroad-controlled legislature. Stoneman also was a proponent of prison reform, believing prisoners could be rehabilitated through parole. He granted 260 pardons and commuted 146 prison sentences in the last few weeks of his term. Stoneman was not renominated for governor in 1886; he left office and retired from public service.

He returned to New York State for medical treatment, and to stay with his sister, Charlotte S. Williams. He suffered a stroke in April 1894 from which he was unable to recover. Stoneman died in Buffalo, New York, on September 5, 1894, at age 72 and was buried at Bentley Cemetery in Lakewood, New York.

== Legacy and honors ==
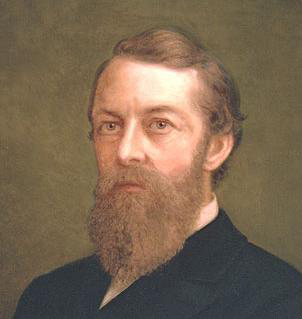
Official portrait (cropped) of Governor George Stoneman, California State Capitol Museum, Sacramento

Stoneman's raids into North Carolina and Virginia in the last weeks of the war were memorialized by songwriter Robbie Robertson of The Band, in the 1969 song "The Night They Drove Old Dixie Down".

Virgil Caine is the name, and I served on the Danville train,
Till Stoneman's cavalry came and tore up the tracks again ...

Stoneman is not mentioned in the 1971 recording of the song by Joan Baez, in which she substitutes "so much cavalry" for "Stoneman's cavalry". Baez told Kurt Loder of Rolling Stone magazine that she had learned the song by listening to the track on The Band's album. Having never seen the printed lyrics, she sang the words as she (mis)heard them.

Stoneman Avenue in Alhambra, California, was named in his honor. Camp Stoneman, near Pittsburg, California, was the place from which many soldiers shipped out to the Pacific Theater in World War II and the Korean War. Stoneman Elementary School in San Marino, California, is built on Stoneman's Los Robles Ranch property. In 1885, California, which owned Yosemite at the time, built a luxury hotel with accommodations for 150 guests near the present location of Curry Village and named the hotel Stoneman House. The adjoining Stoneman Meadow takes its name from the hotel. The nearby Stoneman Bridge takes its name from the meadow. The hotel burned to the ground in 1896. Stoneman Lake in Arizona is also named in his honor. General George Stoneman Business Park, the site of the Southern Tier Brewery, is located on the Stoneman family farm in the town of Busti, New York.

General Stoneman's name is engraved on the Sonoma Veterans Memorial Park Star of Honor due to his time there before the Civil War.

== See also ==
- List of American Civil War generals (Union)

== Notes ==
Party political offices
Preceded by Hugh J. Glenn	Democratic nominee for Governor of California; 1882	Succeeded by Washington Bartlett
Political offices
Preceded by George C. Perkins	Governor of California; 1883–1887	Succeeded by Washington Bartlett
Military offices
Preceded by Samuel P. Heintzelman	Commander of the III Corps (Army of the Potomac); October 30, 1862 – February 5, 1863	Succeeded by Daniel E. Sickles
