= Charles N. Felton =

American politician

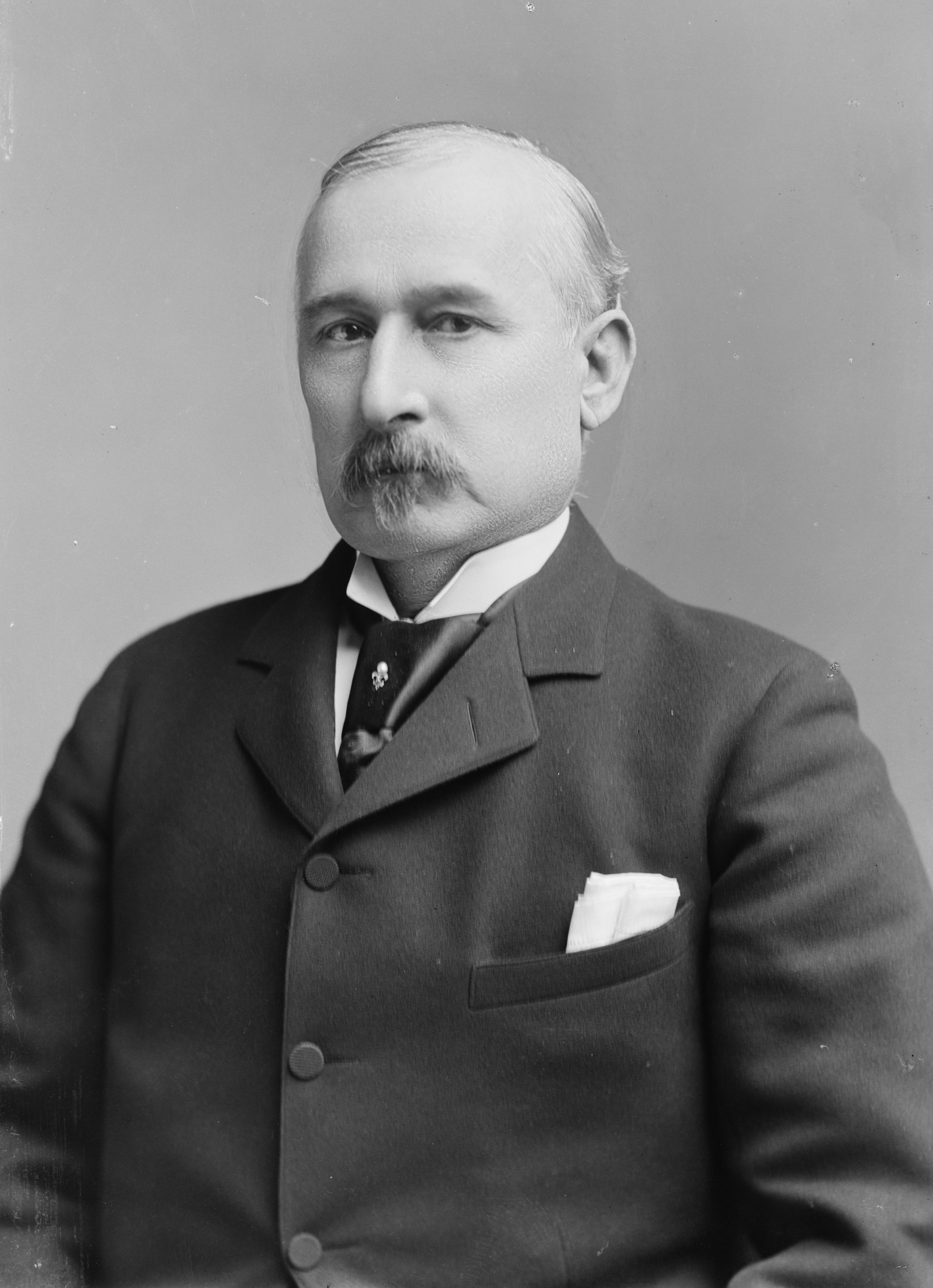
- Portrait c. 1891–1893

United States Senator from California
- In office March 19, 1891 – March 3, 1893
- Preceded by: George Hearst
- Succeeded by: Stephen M. White

Member of the U.S. House of Representatives from California's 5th district
- In office March 4, 1885 – March 3, 1889
- Preceded by: District established
- Succeeded by: Thomas J. Clunie

Member of the California State Assembly
- In office 1880–1882

Personal details
- Born: January 1, 1832 Buffalo, New York, U.S.
- Died: September 13, 1914 (aged 82) Menlo Park, California, U.S.
- Resting place: Cypress Lawn Memorial Park
- Party: Republican
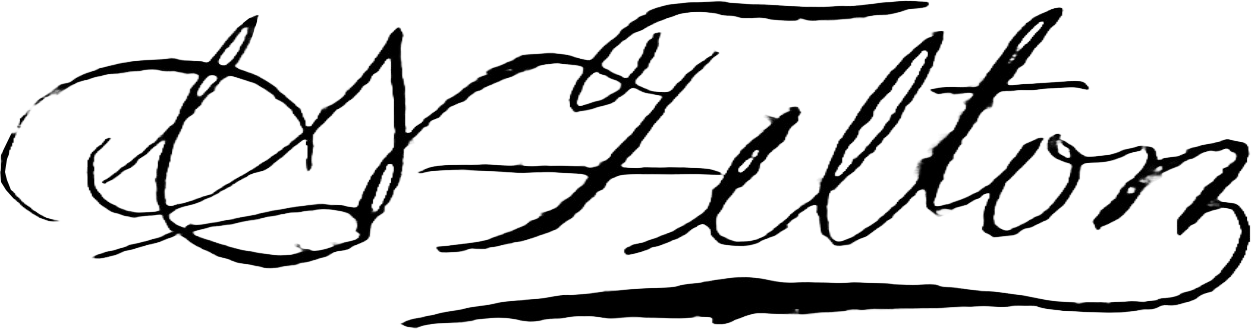
- Signature

Charles Norton Felton (January 1, 1832 – September 13, 1914) was an American banker and politician who was a U.S. representative from California from 1885 to 1889 and a U.S. senator from California from 1891 to 1893. He was a co-founder of what would become the Chevron Corporation.

== Biography ==
Felton was born on January 1, 1832, in Buffalo, New York. The Feltons were of English descent. He attended and received his education from Syracuse Academy before studying law and being admitted to the bar; however, he never entered practice.

=== Early career ===
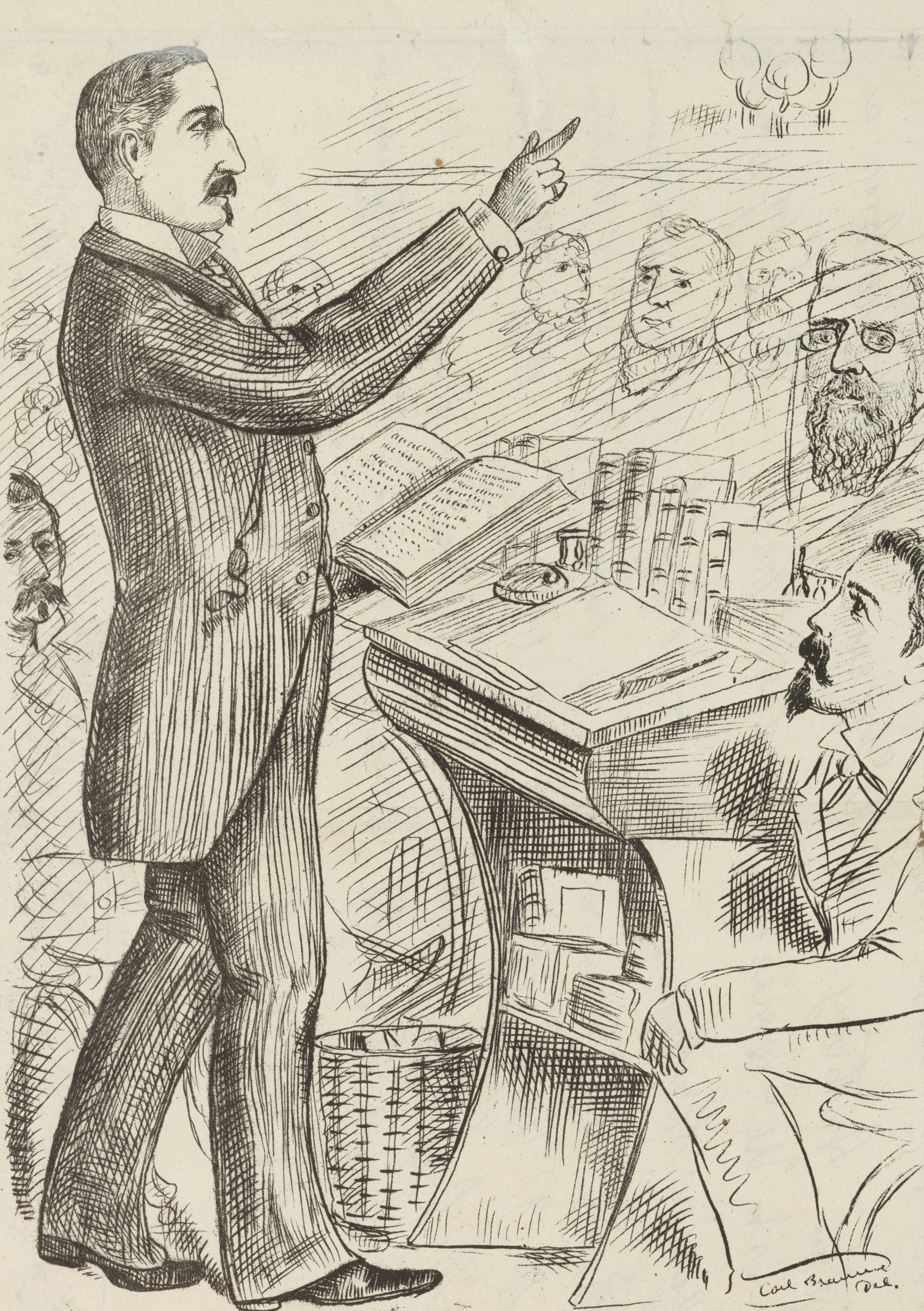
"The Napoleon of the House, C. N. Felton, making the effective speech on the Debris Bill." 1880 sketch by Carl Browne

Felton moved to California in 1849 and entered the mercantile business and subsequently banking. In 1853, he became sheriff of Yuba County, California. Felton served as a tax collector before being appointed as treasurer of the United States Mint at San Francisco. From 1868 to 1877, he served as Assistant Treasurer of the United States. Felton also served in the California State Assembly from 1880 to 1882.

=== Congress ===
In 1884, he was elected to the United States House of Representatives as a Republican for the 49th Congress. He subsequently won reelection to his seat in 1886 for the 50th Congress.

He did not seek election to a third term in the U.S. House in 1888 after serving from March 1885 to March 1889.

=== U.S. Senate ===
Felton was elected to the United States Senate in 1891 to represent California to fill the vacancy caused by the death of George Hearst, serving from March 19, 1891, to March 3, 1893. He did not seek reelection.

=== Later career and death ===
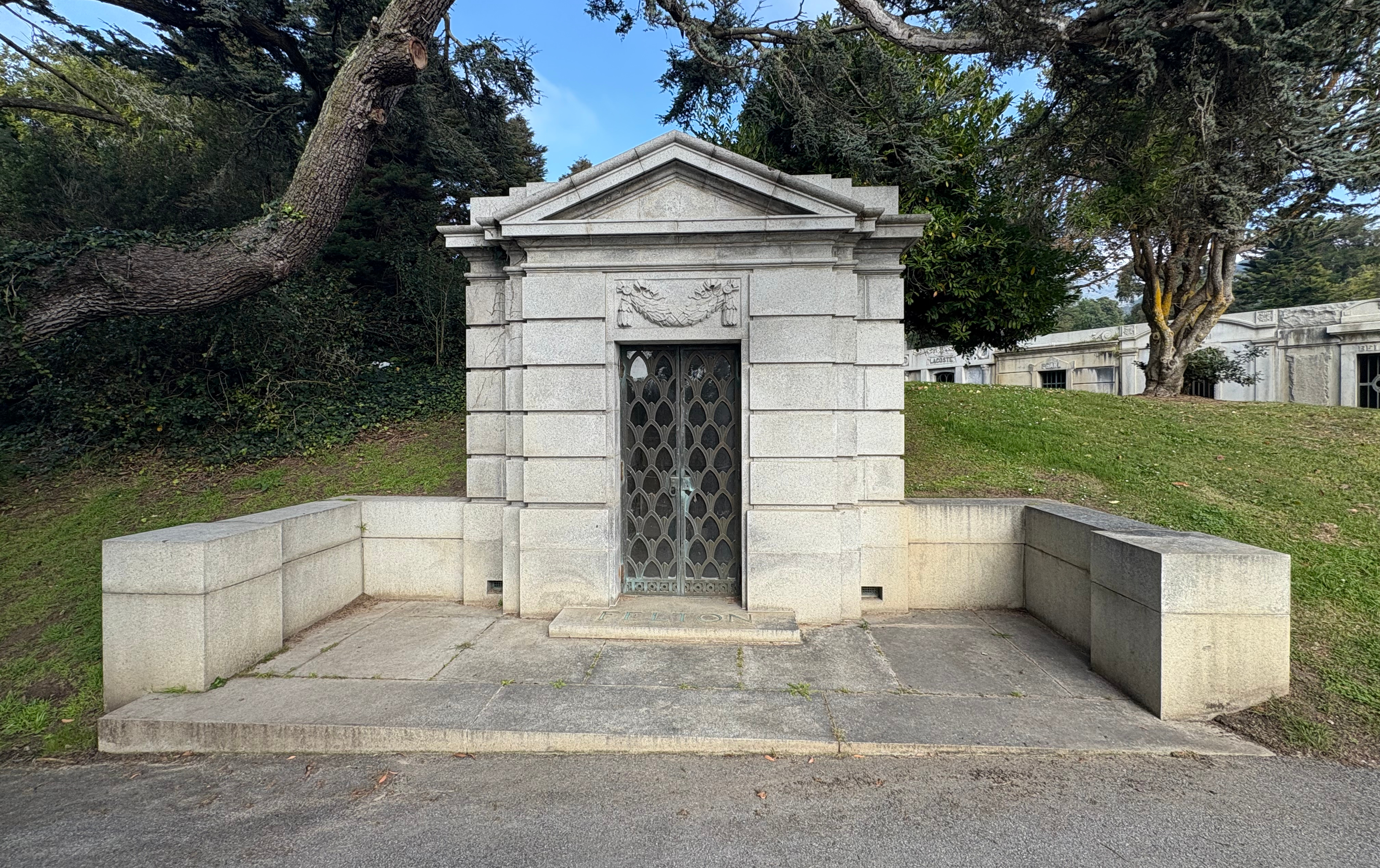
Felton mausoleum at Cypress Lawn Memorial Park

Upon retiring from the U.S. Senate, Felton served as a state prison director from 1903 to 1907. He died at his home in Menlo Park, California, on September 13, 1914, and was buried at Cypress Lawn Memorial Park in Colma.

== Electoral history ==
Frank J. Sullivan, Felton's Democratic Party opponent in the 1884 and 1886 elections, on the cover of The Wasp, October 9, 1886

1884 United States House of Representatives elections in California
Party	Candidate	Votes	%
Republican	Charles N. Felton	17,014	51.7
Democratic	Frank J. Sullivan	15,676	47.6
Prohibition	William Crowhurst	232	0.7
Total votes		32,922	100.0
Turnout			
Republican gain from Democratic			

1886 United States House of Representatives elections in California
Party	Candidate	Votes	%
Republican	Charles N. Felton (Incumbent)	16,328	48.8
Democratic	Frank J. Sullivan	16,209	48.4
Independent	Albert E. Redstone	470	1.4
Prohibition	C. Henderson	460	1.4
Total votes		33,467	100.0
Turnout			
Republican hold			

U.S. House of Representatives
Preceded by none	United States Representative for the 5th district of California; 1885–1889	Succeeded by Thomas J. Clunie
U.S. Senate
Preceded by George Hearst	U.S. senator (Class 1) from California; 1891–1893; Served alongside: Leland Stanford	Succeeded by Stephen M. White
