= 1882 California gubernatorial election =

- November 7, 1882
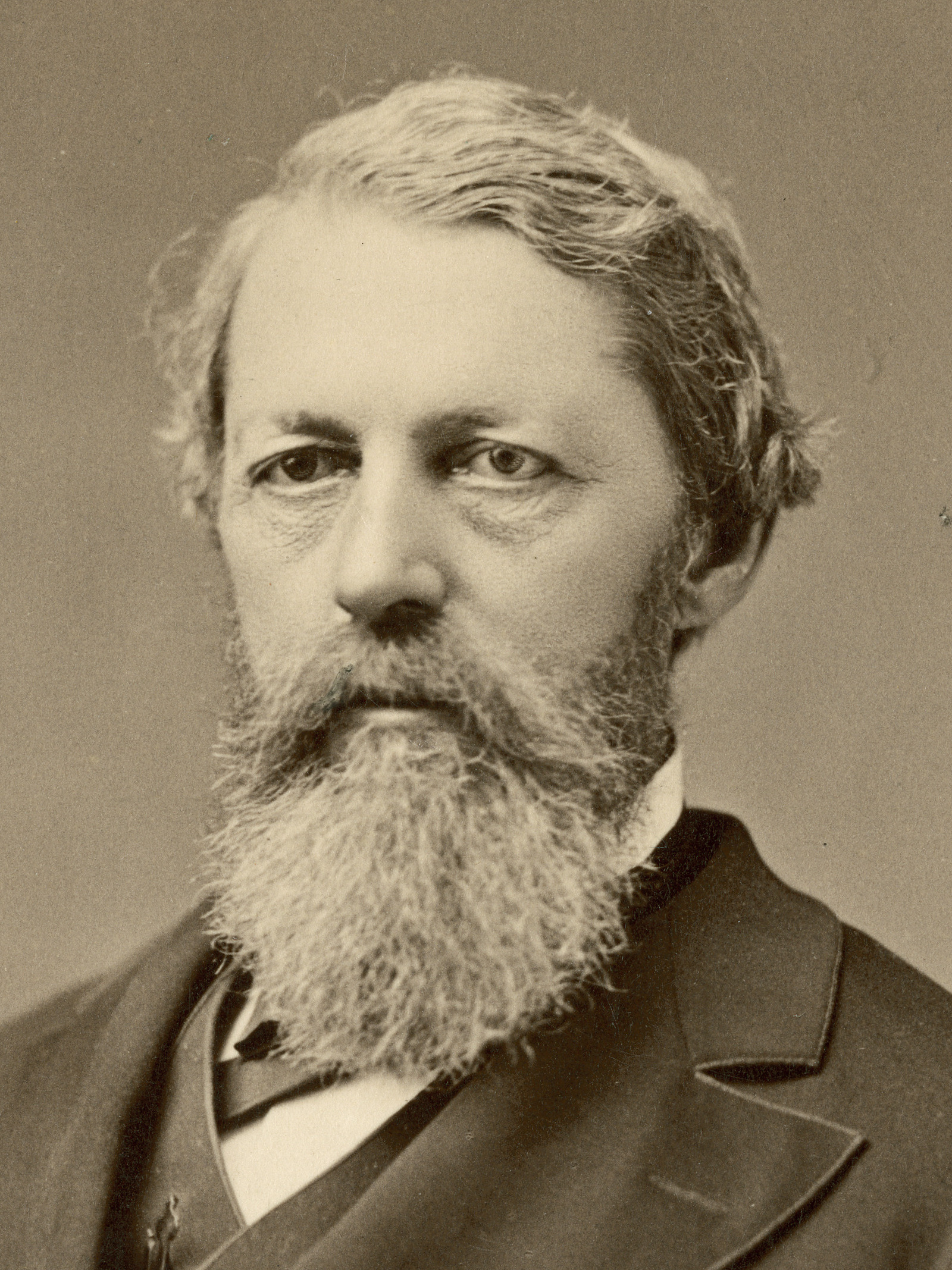

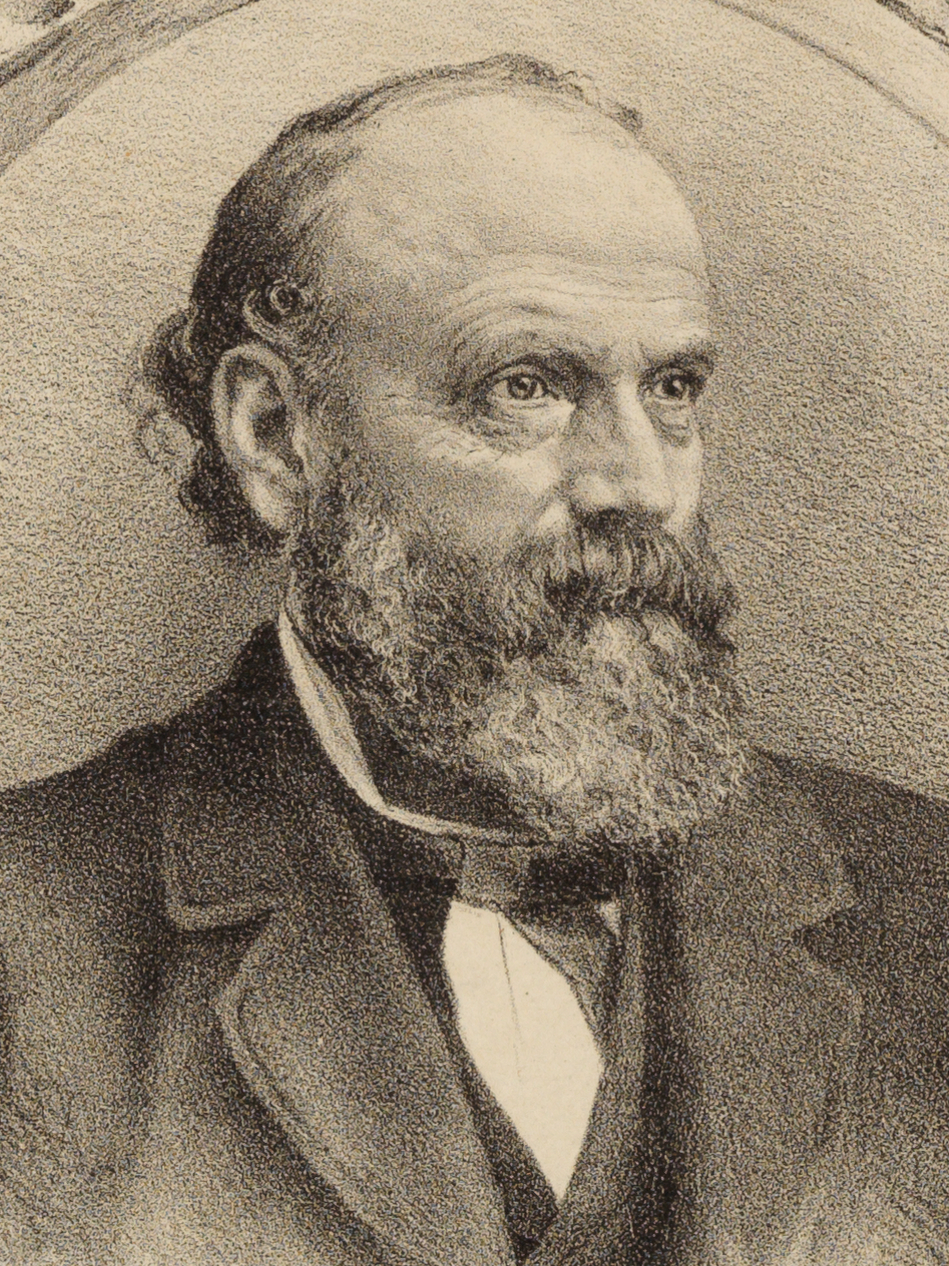
Nominee	George Stoneman	Morris M. Estee
Party	Democratic	Republican
Popular vote	90,694	67,175
Percentage	55.07%	40.79%
- County results Stoneman: 40–50% 50–60% 60–70% Estee: 40–50% 50–60%
Governor before election
George C. Perkins
Republican
Elected Governor
George Stoneman
Democratic

The 1882 California gubernatorial election was held on November 7, 1882, to elect the governor of California. This was the first election held under California's 1879 constitution which moved the election date for state officers to coincide with federal elections in non-presidential even-numbered years. The Democratic Party's nominee, George Stoneman won a decisive victory over the Republican Morris M. Estee. This was the fifth consecutive gubernatorial election in California in which the incumbent party was defeated.

== Results ==
California gubernatorial election, 1882
Party	Candidate	Votes	%	±%
Democratic	George Stoneman	90,694	55.07%	+25.33%
Republican	Morris M. Estee	67,175	40.79%	−1.63%
Prohibition	R. H. McDonald	5,772	3.51%	+3.43%
Greenback	Thomas J. McQuiddy	1,020	0.62%	+0.62%
	Scattering	18	0.01%	
Majority		25,319	14.28%	
Total votes		164,673	100.00%	
Democratic gain from Republican				

=== Results by county ===
County	George Stoneman Democratic		Morris M. Estee Republican		R. H. McDonald Prohibition		Thomas J. McQuiddy Greenback		Scattering Write-in		Margin		Total votes cast
County	#	%	#	%	#	%	#	%	#	%	#	%	Total votes cast
Alameda	4,617	50.04%	4,239	45.94%	369	4.00%	2	0.02%	0	0.00%	378	4.10%	9,227
Alpine	42	45.16%	51	54.84%	0	0.00%	0	0.00%	0	0.00%	-9	-9.68%	93
Amador	1,391	53.01%	1,126	42.91%	107	4.08%	0	0.00%	0	0.00%	265	10.10%	2,624
Butte	1,954	52.34%	1,585	42.46%	194	5.20%	0	0.00%	0	0.00%	369	9.88%	3,733
Calaveras	1,188	52.38%	1,054	46.47%	24	1.06%	2	0.09%	0	0.00%	134	5.91%	2,268
Colusa	1,619	65.52%	656	26.55%	195	7.89%	0	0.00%	1	0.04%	963	38.97%	2,471
Contra Costa	1,186	50.62%	1,097	46.82%	58	2.48%	2	0.09%	0	0.00%	89	3.80%	2,343
Del Norte	318	56.58%	183	32.56%	58	10.32%	3	0.53%	0	0.00%	135	24.02%	562
El Dorado	1,517	54.73%	1,171	42.24%	67	2.42%	17	0.61%	0	0.00%	346	12.48%	2,772
Fresno	1,418	62.58%	775	34.20%	65	2.87%	8	0.35%	0	0.00%	643	28.38%	2,266
Humboldt	1,272	41.68%	1,288	42.20%	173	5.67%	319	10.45%	0	0.00%	-16	-0.52%	3,052
Inyo	312	50.24%	300	48.31%	9	1.45%	0	0.00%	0	0.00%	12	1.93%	621
Kern	871	65.98%	425	32.20%	22	1.67%	0	0.00%	2	0.15%	446	33.79%	1,320
Lake	730	61.92%	420	35.62%	29	2.46%	0	0.00%	0	0.00%	310	26.29%	1,179
Lassen	404	54.82%	279	37.86%	29	3.93%	25	3.39%	0	0.00%	125	16.96%	737
Los Angeles	3,943	56.02%	2,912	41.37%	131	1.86%	53	0.75%	0	0.00%	1,031	14.65%	7,039
Marin	663	51.76%	592	46.21%	22	1.72%	4	0.31%	0	0.00%	71	5.54%	1,281
Mariposa	629	59.56%	407	38.54%	19	1.80%	1	0.09%	0	0.00%	222	21.02%	1,056
Mendocino	1,515	61.91%	788	32.20%	144	5.88%	0	0.00%	0	0.00%	727	29.71%	2,447
Merced	884	61.60%	516	35.96%	32	2.23%	3	0.21%	0	0.00%	368	25.64%	1,435
Modoc	466	56.48%	301	36.48%	58	7.03%	0	0.00%	0	0.00%	165	20.00%	825
Mono	689	47.55%	737	50.86%	12	0.83%	11	0.76%	0	0.00%	-48	-3.31%	1,449
Monterey	1,302	52.67%	1,071	43.33%	92	3.72%	7	0.28%	0	0.00%	231	9.34%	2,472
Napa	1,142	47.80%	1,222	51.15%	24	1.00%	1	0.04%	0	0.00%	-80	-3.35%	2,389
Nevada	2,013	47.10%	2,182	51.05%	78	1.82%	1	0.02%	0	0.00%	-169	-3.95%	4,274
Placer	1,463	50.38%	1,273	43.84%	148	5.10%	20	0.69%	0	0.00%	190	6.54%	2,904
Plumas	648	50.00%	567	43.75%	81	6.25%	0	0.00%	0	0.00%	81	6.25%	1,296
Sacramento	3,248	48.37%	3,048	45.39%	361	5.38%	58	0.86%	0	0.00%	200	2.98%	6,715
San Benito	660	60.89%	422	38.93%	2	0.18%	0	0.00%	0	0.00%	238	21.96%	1,084
San Bernardino	1,029	50.27%	943	46.07%	36	1.76%	39	1.91%	0	0.00%	86	4.20%	2,047
San Diego	782	48.33%	803	49.63%	32	1.98%	1	0.06%	0	0.00%	-21	-1.30%	1,618
San Francisco	24,257	62.34%	13,735	35.30%	829	2.13%	77	0.20%	15	0.04%	10,522	27.04%	38,913
San Joaquin	2,712	53.17%	2,186	42.85%	202	3.96%	1	0.02%	0	0.00%	526	10.31%	5,101
San Luis Obispo	1,037	51.90%	896	44.84%	57	2.85%	8	0.40%	0	0.00%	141	7.06%	1,998
San Mateo	791	54.82%	615	42.62%	37	2.56%	0	0.00%	0	0.00%	176	12.20%	1,443
Santa Barbara	1,014	45.01%	1,006	44.65%	142	6.30%	91	4.04%	0	0.00%	8	0.36%	2,253
Santa Clara	3,308	53.61%	2,693	43.64%	134	2.17%	36	0.58%	0	0.00%	615	9.97%	6,171
Santa Cruz	1,316	52.94%	1,080	43.44%	86	3.46%	4	0.16%	0	0.00%	236	9.49%	2,486
Shasta	954	51.07%	842	45.07%	68	3.64%	4	0.21%	0	0.00%	112	6.00%	1,868
Sierra	647	41.93%	816	52.88%	69	4.47%	11	0.71%	0	0.00%	-169	-10.95%	1,543
Siskiyou	1,000	55.56%	760	42.22%	21	1.17%	19	1.06%	0	0.00%	240	13.33%	1,800
Solano	1,781	46.09%	1,951	50.49%	127	3.29%	5	0.13%	0	0.00%	-170	-4.40%	3,864
Sonoma	2,829	56.16%	1,961	38.93%	203	4.03%	44	0.87%	0	0.00%	868	17.23%	5,037
Stanislaus	1,360	62.85%	714	32.99%	89	4.11%	1	0.05%	0	0.00%	646	29.85%	2,164
Sutter	576	46.87%	426	34.66%	187	15.22%	40	3.25%	0	0.00%	150	12.21%	1,229
Tehama	1,029	55.98%	754	41.02%	54	2.94%	1	0.05%	0	0.00%	275	14.96%	1,838
Trinity	487	54.84%	368	41.44%	33	3.72%	0	0.00%	0	0.00%	119	13.40%	888
Tulare	1,566	59.84%	803	30.68%	160	6.11%	88	3.36%	0	0.00%	763	29.16%	2,617
Tuolumne	1,137	56.12%	808	39.88%	80	3.95%	1	0.05%	0	0.00%	329	16.24%	2,026
Ventura	574	49.87%	540	46.92%	35	3.04%	2	0.17%	0	0.00%	34	2.95%	1,151
Yolo	1,336	51.94%	996	38.72%	233	9.06%	7	0.27%	0	0.00%	340	13.22%	2,572
Yuba	1,068	50.42%	792	37.39%	255	12.04%	3	0.14%	0	0.00%	276	13.03%	2,118
Total	90,694	55.07%	67,175	40.79%	5,772	3.51%	1,020	0.62%	18	0.01%	23,519	14.28%	164,679

==== Counties that flipped from Republican to Democratic ====
- Alameda
- Butte
- Calaveras
- Contra Costa
- Del Norte
- El Dorado
- Marin
- Monterey
- Placer
- Plumas
- Sacramento
- San Francisco
- San Joaquin
- San Mateo
- Santa Barbara
- Santa Clara
- Santa Cruz
- Sutter
- Trinity
- Tuolumne
- Yuba

==== Counties that flipped from Democratic to Republican ====
- San Diego

==== Counties that flipped from Workingmen's to Democratic ====
- San Luis Obispo

==== Counties that flipped from Workingmen's to Republican ====
- Humboldt
