= Joseph B. Crockett =

American judge (1808–1884)

Joseph Bryant Crockett
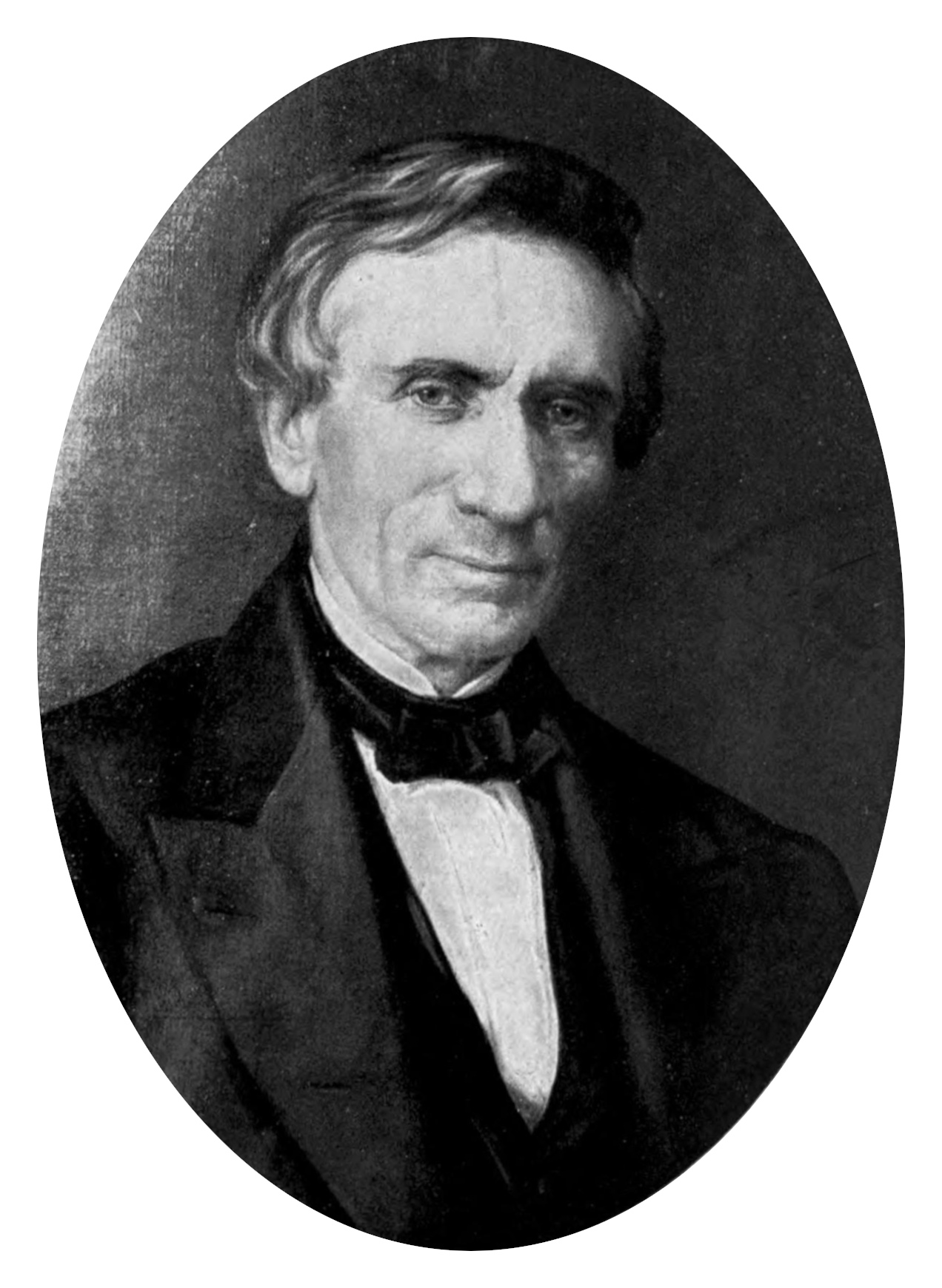

Associate Justice of the California Supreme Court
- In office December 1867 – January 5, 1880
- Appointed by: Governor Henry Huntly Haight
- Preceded by: Oscar L. Shafter
- Succeeded by: Elections under new constitution of 1879

Personal details
- Born: November 17, 1808 Lexington, Kentucky, U.S.
- Died: January 15, 1884 (aged 75) Fruit Vale, California, U.S.
- Spouse: Caroline Matilda Bryan (m. 1832)
- Education: University of Tennessee at Nashville (no degree)

Joseph Bryant Crockett (November 17, 1808 – January 15, 1884) was an American attorney who served as an associate justice of the Supreme Court of California from December 1867 to January 5, 1880.

== Biography ==
Crockett was born in Lexington, Kentucky to Martha Ferguson and Robert Crockett. In 1827, he entered the University of Tennessee at Nashville, but stayed less than one year due to the expense. At the age of 19, he moved to Hopkinsville, Kentucky, and read law in the offices of Charles S. Morehead. In 1830, he formed a partnership of Henry & Crockett, and with the departure of his partner after two years he took over the practice. In August 1833, Crockett was elected to the Kentucky House of Representatives from Christian County. In 1836, he formed a firm with a young attorney, James F. Buckner, in the partnership of Crockett & Buckner, where he was joined by his brother, John W. Crockett. In 1840, Crockett moved to St. Louis, Missouri, where he edited a newspaper, the Intelligencer, and continued to practice law. In 1850, he ran under the Whig Party for the Missouri House of Representatives.

In 1852, he joined with Gwin Page, a fellow pupil from Morehead's law office, to come to San Francisco, California. They formed a law partnership, and Crockett continued his involvement in Democratic Party politics. In 1864, Crockett ran for the United States House of Representatives in California's 1st congressional district on the Democratic Party ticket, but lost to Republican Donald C. McRuer. After Page's death in 1857, Crockett formed the firm of Crockett & Whiting, and was joined in 1867 by Joseph Naphtally as a name partner.

In December 1868, Governor Henry Huntly Haight appointed Crockett as Associate Justice of the California Supreme Court to fill the vacancy left the resignation of Oscar L. Shafter. In October 1869, Crockett ran against William T. Wallace and Lorenzo Sawyer and was elected for the remainder of Shafter's term. In 1879, a constitutional convention was held, and a new constitution was adopted that called for elections for all seats of the Supreme Court. Crockett did not run in the September 1879 election.

On January 15, 1884, Crockett died at his home in Fruitvale, California.

== Clubs ==
Crockett was a member of the Bohemian Club.

== Personal life ==
On November 15, 1832, Crockett married Caroline Matilda Bryan in Hopkinsville, Kentucky, and they had eight children.

== See also ==
- List of justices of the Supreme Court of California
- Augustus Rhodes
- Silas Sanderson
- Lorenzo Sawyer
- Royal Sprague

Political offices
Preceded by Oscar L. Shafter	Associate Justice of the California Supreme Court; 1867–1880	Succeeded by Elections under new Constitution of 1879
