= William T. Wallace =

American judge

William Thompson Wallace
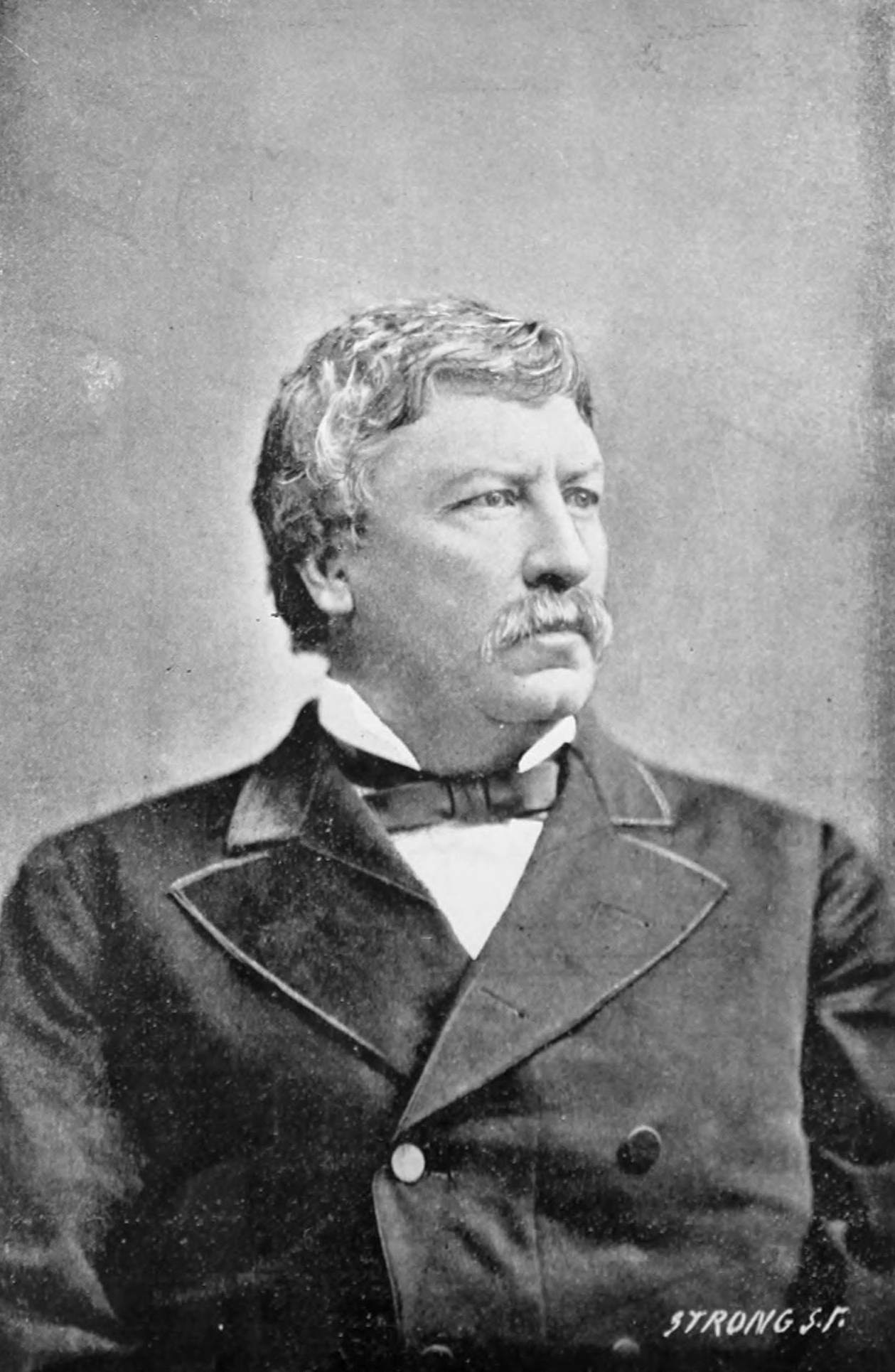
- Wallace c. 1891

12th Chief Justice of California
- In office March 1872 – December 1879
- Preceded by: Royal Sprague
- Succeeded by: Robert F. Morrison

Associate Justice of the California Supreme Court
- In office January 1, 1871 – March 1872
- Appointed by: Direct election
- Preceded by: Lorenzo Sawyer
- Succeeded by: Elections under new constitution of 1879

6th Attorney General of California
- In office January 9, 1856 – January 8, 1858
- Governor: J. Neely Johnson
- Preceded by: John R. McConnell
- Succeeded by: Thomas H. Williams

Personal details
- Born: March 22, 1828 Mount Sterling, Kentucky, U.S.
- Died: August 11, 1909 (aged 81) San Francisco, California, U.S.
- Party: Democratic; Know Nothing
- Spouse: Romietta J. Burnett (m. 1853)
- Relatives: Richard Roman

William Thompson Wallace (March 22, 1828 – August 11, 1909) was an American judge. He was the 12th Chief Justice of California and the 6th Attorney General of California. He served on the Supreme Court of California from 1871 to 1879 and as Attorney General from 1856 to 1858.

== Biography ==
Wallace was born on March 22, 1828, in Mount Sterling, Kentucky. His father, Joseph, was a physician, who by 1850 was widowed with six children living in Montgomery County, Kentucky. Wallace was educated and read law, followed his older brother onto the Kentucky bar and practiced law.

In 1850, at age 22, Wallace moved to San Jose, California. He began a law firm with C. T. Ryland, and was joined after January 1851 by Peter H. Burnett, after he completed his term as the first Governor of California. In 1852, Wallace won appointment as District Attorney for four counties, based in San Jose. After one year, he resigned and began a private practice.

In September 1855, Wallace ran successfully for Attorney General of California for the Know Nothing party, on the same ticket as David S. Terry, who was elected to the California Supreme Court. Wallace served in that office from January 1856 to January 1858.

After leaving office, in 1861 Wallace joined the law firm of Patterson & Stow, formed in 1857 by William H. Patterson and W. W. Stow in San Francisco, and practiced there for seven years.

In October 1869, Wallace ran against Lorenzo Sawyer and was elected as an associate justice of the California Supreme Court. Wallace won a ten-year term beginning January 10, 1870, and ending January 1, 1880. After the February 24, 1872, death of Royal Sprague, from March 1872 to December 1879 Wallace was the chief justice. In 1871, his name was put forward as a candidate of the Democratic Party for U.S. Senator, and even as a possible candidate for Vice President of the United States.

As early as August 1880, Wallace was again considered as a candidate for U.S. Senate by the Democratic Party. On January 12, 1881, the California State Assembly chose Republican General John F. Miller of Napa to replace Newton Booth as U.S. Senator by a vote of 42 for Miller and 34 for Wallace.

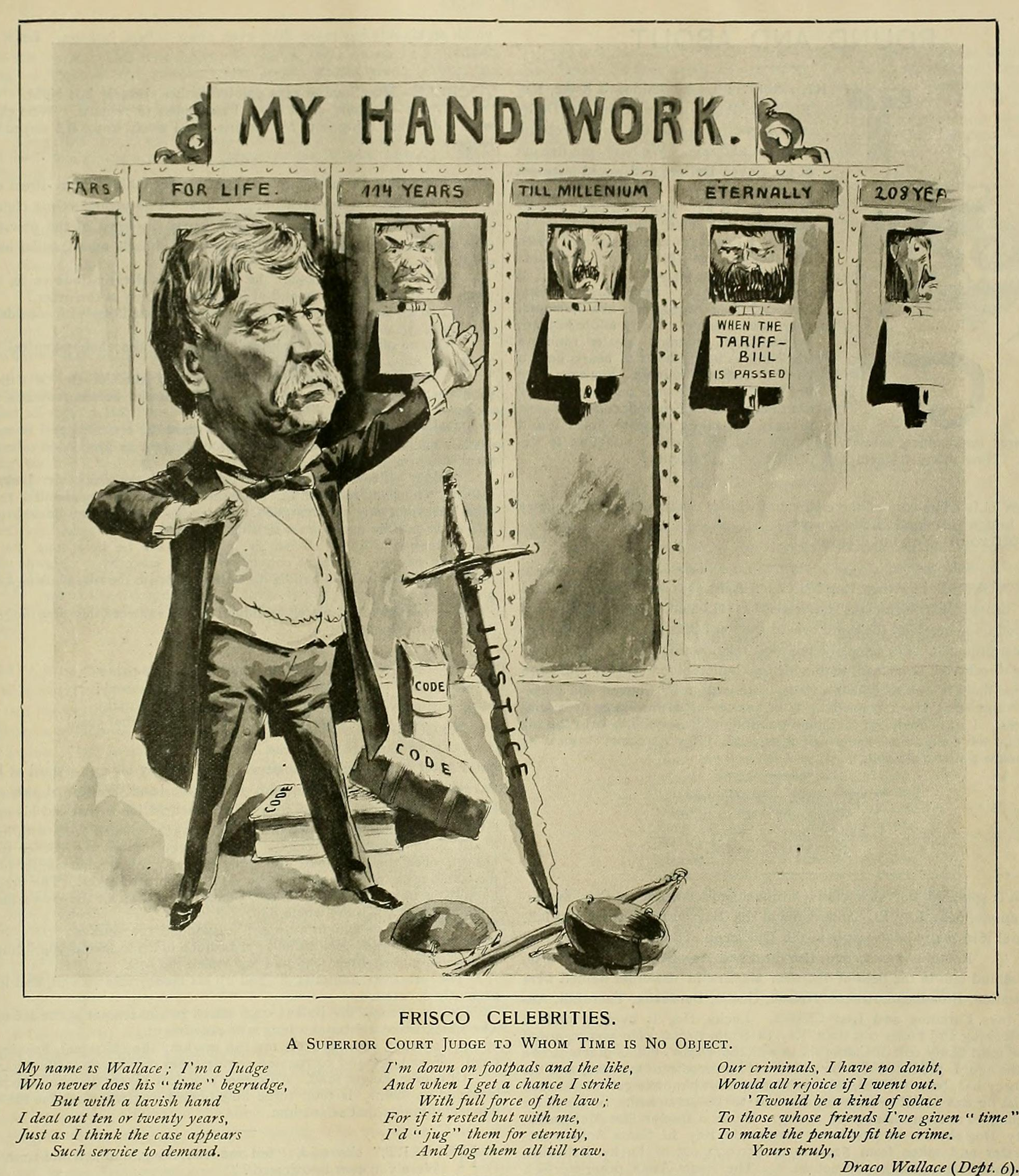
"A Superior Court Judge To Whome Time Is No Object," a political cartoon published in The Wasp depicting Wallace as Draco, June 30, 1894

After stepping down from the high court, Wallace continued to hold public office. In 1884, he was nominated by the Democratic Party and elected to the California State Assembly in a special election for the 13th district, serving until 1885. In 1886, he was elected a judge of the San Francisco County Superior Court, Department Six, for a six-year term. In 1892, he was reelected to another six-year term. In 1899, Wallace was appointed to the San Francisco Police Commission by Mayor James D. Phelan, and held that position until 1903.

Wallace died on August 11, 1909, in San Francisco, California.

== Civic activities ==
In October 1875, Governor Romualdo Pacheco appointed Wallace a regent of the University of California.

Wallace was a member of the Bohemian Club.

== Personal life ==
On March 30, 1853, he married Romietta Juet Burnett, the daughter of his law partner and first Governor of California under American rule, Peter Burnett. They had three sons: William T. Wallace Jr., who died in 1899; Richard R. Wallace; and Ryland B. Wallace, who became an attorney and in May 1895 was appointed as a code commissioner by Governor James Budd. They also had four daughters: Mary A. and Margaret, and Romie and Isabelle ("Belle") Wallace. On January 25, 1884, Belle first married Colonel J. Mervyn Donohue. After his death on March 3, 1890, she married R. H. Sprague on October 11, 1894, at her father's home.

== See also ==
- List of justices of the Supreme Court of California
- Joseph B. Crockett
- Royal Sprague
- Jackson Temple
- Addison Niles
- Isaac S. Belcher
- Elisha W. McKinstry

== Selected publications ==
- Wallace, William T. (1857). In memoriam to Hugh Murray, 8 Cal. Rpt. iii. California Supreme Court Historical Society.

Legal offices
Preceded by Royal Sprague	Chief Justice of California; 1872–1879	Succeeded by Robert F. Morrison
Preceded by Lorenzo Sawyer	Associate Justice of the California Supreme Court; 1871–1872	Succeeded by Elections under new constitution of 1879
Preceded by William M. Stewart	Attorney General of California; 1856–1858	Succeeded by Thomas H. Williams
