= Oscar L. Shafter =

American judge (1812–1873)

Oscar Lovell Shafter
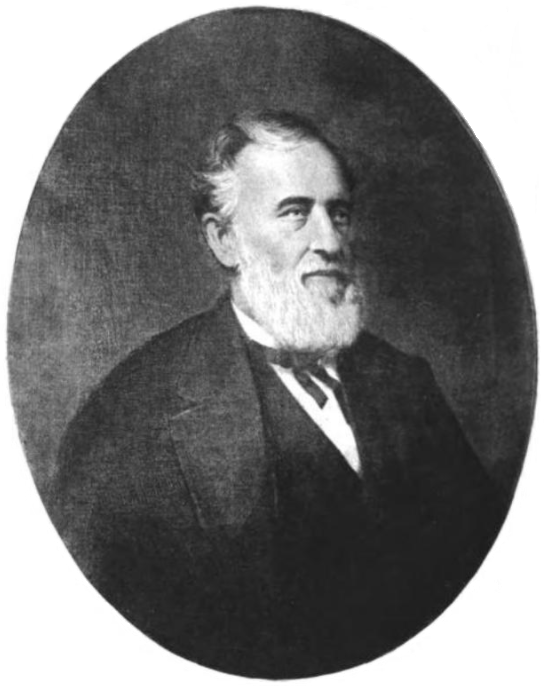

Associate Justice of the California Supreme Court
- In office January 2, 1864 – December 11, 1867
- Appointed by: Direct election
- Preceded by: Elections under 1862 amendment to California constitution and 1863 enabling law
- Succeeded by: Joseph B. Crockett

Personal details
- Born: October 19, 1812 Athens, Vermont, U.S.
- Died: January 22, 1873 (aged 60) Florence, Italy
- Spouse: Sarah Riddle (m. 1841)
- Relations: James McMillan Shafter, brother; William Rufus Shafter, nephew
- Education: Wesleyan University (BA); Harvard Law School

Oscar Lovell Shafter (October 19, 1812 – January 22, 1873) was an American attorney and Associate Justice of the Supreme Court of California from January 2, 1864, to December 11, 1867 with a legacy of expanding the California dairy industry.

Originally from Vermont he moved to California in 1854 and practiced law in San Francisco. In 1857, he and his brother James McMillan Shafter won a legal battle after which their client sold them the contested property of Point Reyes. They bought almost the entire peninsula for less than $85,000 and developed it as the leading dairy region in the entire West.

== Early life and education ==
Shafter was born in Athens, Vermont to Mary and William R. Shafter. His father was an attorney, judge and member of the Vermont Legislature. His grandfather, James Shafter, fought in the American Revolution, was one of the founders of the town of Athens in Vermont in 1779, and served in the Vermont Legislature for 20 years. Shafter attended Wilbraham Wesleyan Academy in Massachusetts, and in 1834 graduated from Wesleyan University. After graduation, he returned to Vermont and commenced reading law. He entered Harvard Law School and in 1836 graduated with a LL.B. He returned to Wilmington, Vermont, and entered into private practice for the next 18 years. He was elected to the state Legislature, and ran as the Free Soil Party and Liberty Party candidate for the United States House of Representatives, Senate, and Governor of Vermont. While practicing in Wilmington, the prospective attorneys who studied under him included Charles N. Davenport.

== Career ==
In 1854, at the invitation of a Vermont friend, Trenor Park, Shafter came to California and practiced law in San Francisco with Halleck, Peachy, Billings & Park. His brother, James McMillan Shafter, also attended Wesleyan University, and graduated from Yale Law School. Arriving in San Francisco in 1855, James joined his brother Oscar in forming the firm of Shafter, Shafter, Park and Heydenfeldt with Park and Solomon Heydenfeldt, who was the first elected Jewish member of the California Supreme Court, serving from 1852 to 1857. Oscar was renowned as a real estate attorney and expert in quieting title.

In 1857, a complex real estate litigation resulted in Shafter winning a victory for his client, Dr. Robert McMillan, of a large tract of land at Point Reyes (including Rancho Punta de los Reyes Sobrante and Rancho Punta de los Reyes) in Marin County. McMillan sold the 75,000 acre property at a discount to the Shafters, who paid roughly $85,000 for the parcel. In turn, they leased land to dairy farmers who provided milk and butter to an ever-growing San Francisco and prospered. The families of Oscar and James Shafter owned large portions of Point Reyes from 1857 to 1919, when the land was sold in parcels.

In 1860, Shafter was the Republican nominee for U.S. Senate, but lost to Lecompton Democrat Milton Latham. In 1863, a constitutional amendment meant all of the seats of the Supreme Court of California were open for election. In October 1863, Oscar Shafter was elected as a justice on the Republican Party ticket, and begin his term in January 1864. The justices drew lots for term length and Shafter was assigned the long, 10-year term as an associate justice. In December 1867, he resigned due to ill health. Governor Henry Huntly Haight appointed Joseph B. Crockett to Shafter's seat.

Shafter was again a candidate for U.S. Senate in the 1873 special and regular Senatorial elections, but lost to Democrat John S. Hager and Anti-Monopolist Newton Booth, respectively.

Seeking to recover his health, Shafter traveled to Europe in 1872. He died age 60 at Florence, Italy, on January 22, 1873.

== Personal life ==
Shafter married Sarah Riddle in Wilmington, Vermont, in 1840 and the couple had eleven children: ten daughters and one son. Four daughters and the son died at an early age, his son while he had moved to San Francisco in 1854 before his wife and two of their surviving daughters joined him in 1855. His nephew was William Rufus Shafter, a general in the American Civil War and recipient of the Medal of Honor.

Shafter kept a journal which describes the natural environment, social customs and living conditions of the California pioneers.

== See also ==
- List of justices of the Supreme Court of California
- Augustus Rhodes
- Silas Sanderson
- Lorenzo Sawyer
- John Currey

Party political offices
Preceded by Lawrence Brainerd	Free Soil nominee for Governor of Vermont; 1848	Succeeded by Horatio Needham
Political offices
Preceded by Elections under 1862 amendment to California constitution and 1863 enabling law	Associate Justice of the California Supreme Court; 1864–1867	Succeeded by Joseph B. Crockett
