= 1860 United States Senate special election in California =

- January 9, 1860

Majority vote of both houses needed to win
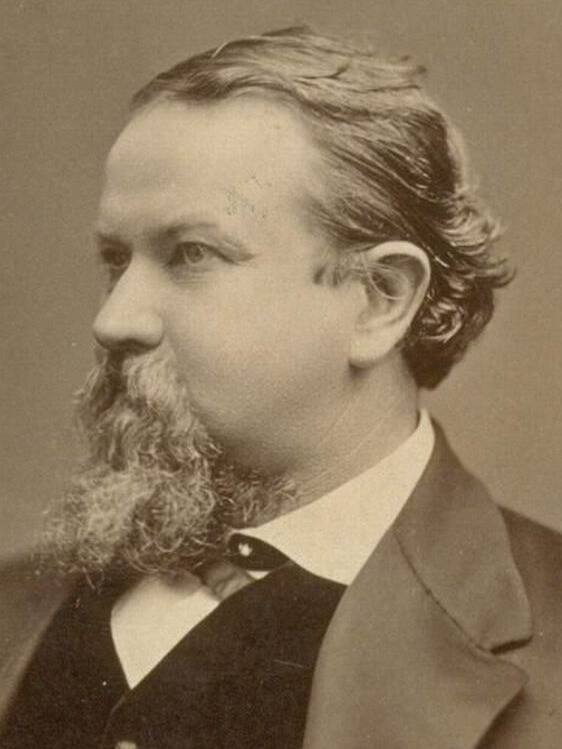

Nominee	Milton Latham	Edmund Randolph
Party	Lecompton Democratic	Democratic
Joint session	97	14
Percentage	85.09%	12.28%
Senator before election
Henry Haun
Democratic
Elected Senator
Milton Latham
Lecompton Democratic

The 1860 United States Senate special election in California was held on January 9, 1860, by the California State Legislature to elect a U.S. senator (Class 1) to represent the State of California in the United States Senate. In a special joint session, Lecompton Democratic Governor Milton Latham was elected over regular Democratic former State Assemblyman Edmund Randolph and Republican attorney Oscar L. Shafter.

== Results ==
Election in the legislature (joint session)
Party	Candidate	Votes	%
Lecompton Democratic	Milton Latham	97	85.09%
Democratic	Edmund Randolph	14	12.28%
Republican	Oscar L. Shafter	3	2.63%
Total votes		114	100.00%
