= Thomas H. Williams (California official) =

American politician and lawyer (1928–1886)

Thomas Hansford Williams

7th Attorney General of California
- In office January 8, 1858 – January 10, 1862
- Governor: John B. Weller; Milton Latham; John G. Downey
- Preceded by: William T. Wallace
- Succeeded by: Frank M. Pixley

Personal details
- Born: May 18, 1828 Monticello, Wayne County, Kentucky, U.S.
- Died: February 28, 1886 (aged 57) San Francisco, California, U.S.
- Resting place: Cypress Lawn Memorial Park
- Parent: Sherrod Williams (father)
- Occupation: Lawyer, politician, businessperson

"General" Thomas Hansford Williams (May 18, 1828 – February 28, 1886) was an American lawyer and politician. He served as the Attorney General of California, 1858 to 1862; and was the seventh person to hold that office.

== Personal information ==
Williams was born on May 18, 1828, in Monticello, Wayne County, Kentucky. His father was Sherrod Williams a politician from Kentucky. His brother was George E. Williams (1835–1899), a member of the California State Assembly15th District, from 1873 to 1875.

Williams had a son of the same name who sometimes went by "Tom.” His son lived from 1859 to 1915, and was the president of the California Jockey Club.

== Career ==
Engraving of Williams published 1858

Williams came to California on horseback in either 1850 or 1852, during the California Gold Rush. He practiced law in the towns of Coloma and Placerville.

From 1858 to 1862, he was the California State Attorney General. His nickname "General" came from serving as the attorney general. Upon becoming Attorney General of California, Williams quickly became involved in corporate oversight especially because of the first acts to be passed by California legislatures. These initial acts placed regulations on corporations and businesses. Williams focused much of his efforts in helping the controller in tax litigation. However, Williams later regretted his strong interest in tax litigation due to the excessive increase in taxes imposed on his personal office.

He owned many farming properties in California, and he was a co-founder and partner in the farming business, "Williams and Bixler".

== Death ==
Williams died of heart disease on February 28, 1886, in San Francisco, and was buried at Laurel Hill Cemetery. He was reinterred at Cypress Lawn Memorial Park in Colma, California.

Legal offices
Preceded by William T. Wallace	Attorney General of California; 1858–1862	Succeeded by Frank M. Pixley
