= Robert F. Morrison =

American judge

Robert Francis Morrison
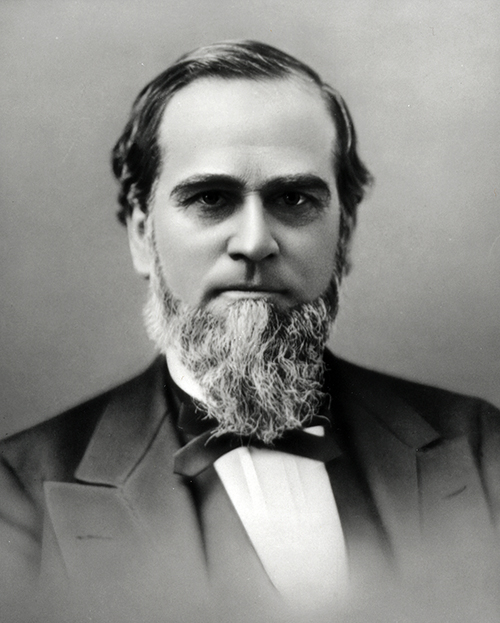

13th Chief Justice of California
- In office November 1879 – March 1887
- Preceded by: William T. Wallace
- Succeeded by: Niles Searls

Personal details
- Born: August 16, 1826 Kaskaskia, Illinois, U.S.
- Died: March 2, 1887 (aged 60) San Francisco, California, U.S.
- Spouse: Julia Stettinius (m. 1854)

Robert Francis Morrison (August 16, 1826 – March 2, 1887) was the 13th Chief Justice of California from November 1879 to March 2, 1887, when he died in office.

== Biography ==
Morrison was born on August 16, 1826, in Kaskaskia, Illinois. He served in the regiment commanded by his elder brother, Colonel Don Morrison, in the Mexican–American War, and fought in the Battle of Buena Vista. After the war, Morrison returned to St. Louis, Missouri, and read law in the office of his brother, who was a successful attorney. He attended legal lectures at Harvard Law School before returning West.

Arriving in 1850 in Sacramento, California, Morrison practiced law in a firm with his brother, Murray Morrison, and J. Neely Johnson, later governor of California. Morrison was elected district attorney of Sacramento County, California. In 1856, Morrison moved to San Francisco and practiced law with various attorneys, including Delos Lake, who was appointed United States Attorney for the Northern District of California on August 17, 1864. Morrison served as Assistant United States Attorney with Lake. In October 1869, Morrison was elected Judge of the Fourth Judicial District in California and was re-elected in 1875.

In October 1879, when adoption of a new constitution required elections, Morrison successfully ran for Chief Justice under the Democratic and Workingmen's Party tickets, narrowly defeating Augustus Rhodes. In August 1886, former Chief Justice David S. Terry petitioned the Legislature to remove the increasingly ill Morrison from the court. In February 1887, Morrison suffered a stroke and died a week later at his rooms at the Occidental Hotel on March 2, 1887. On April 19, 1887, Governor Washington Bartlett appointed Niles Searls as the next chief justice.

== Personal life ==
On November 6, 1854, he married Julia Stettinius (September 2, 1832 – December 18, 1895) in St. Louis, Missouri.

== See also ==
- List of justices of the Supreme Court of California
- Elisha W. McKinstry
- Samuel B. McKee
- Milton H. Myrick
- Erskine M. Ross
- John Sharpstein
- James D. Thornton

Legal offices
| Preceded by William T. Wallace | Chief Justice of California; 1879–1887 | Succeeded by Niles Searls |
