= 1881 United States Senate election in California =

- January 12, 1881

Majority vote of each house needed to win
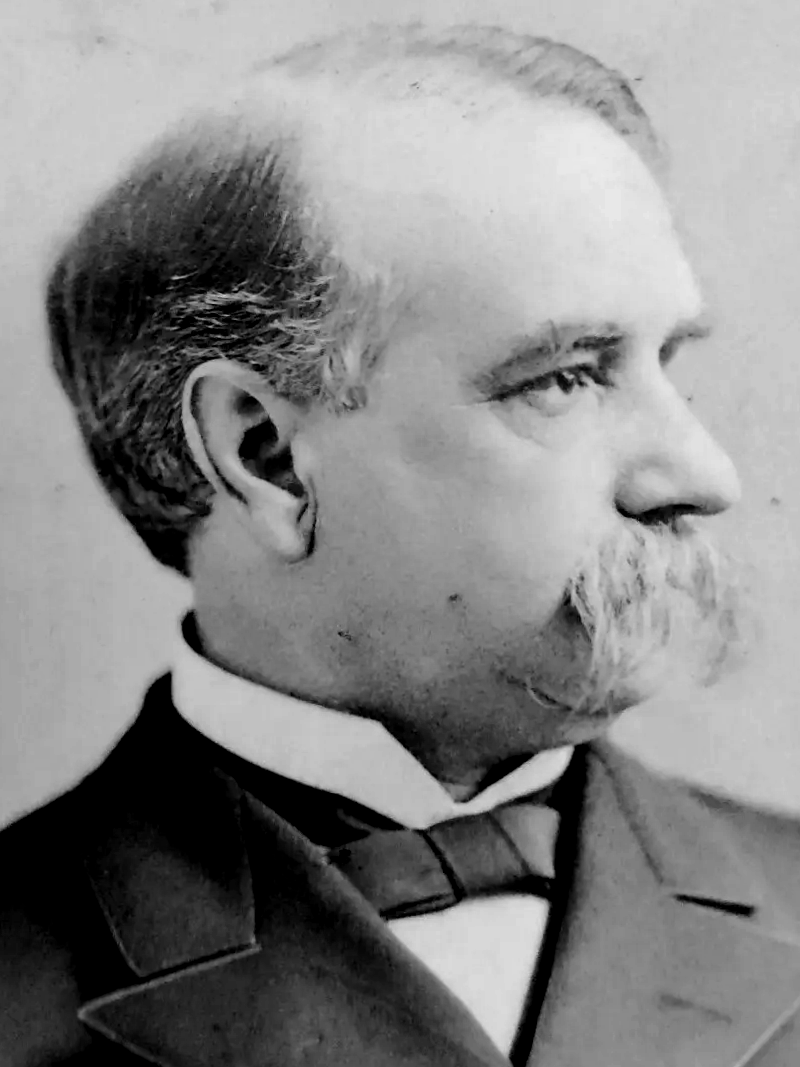

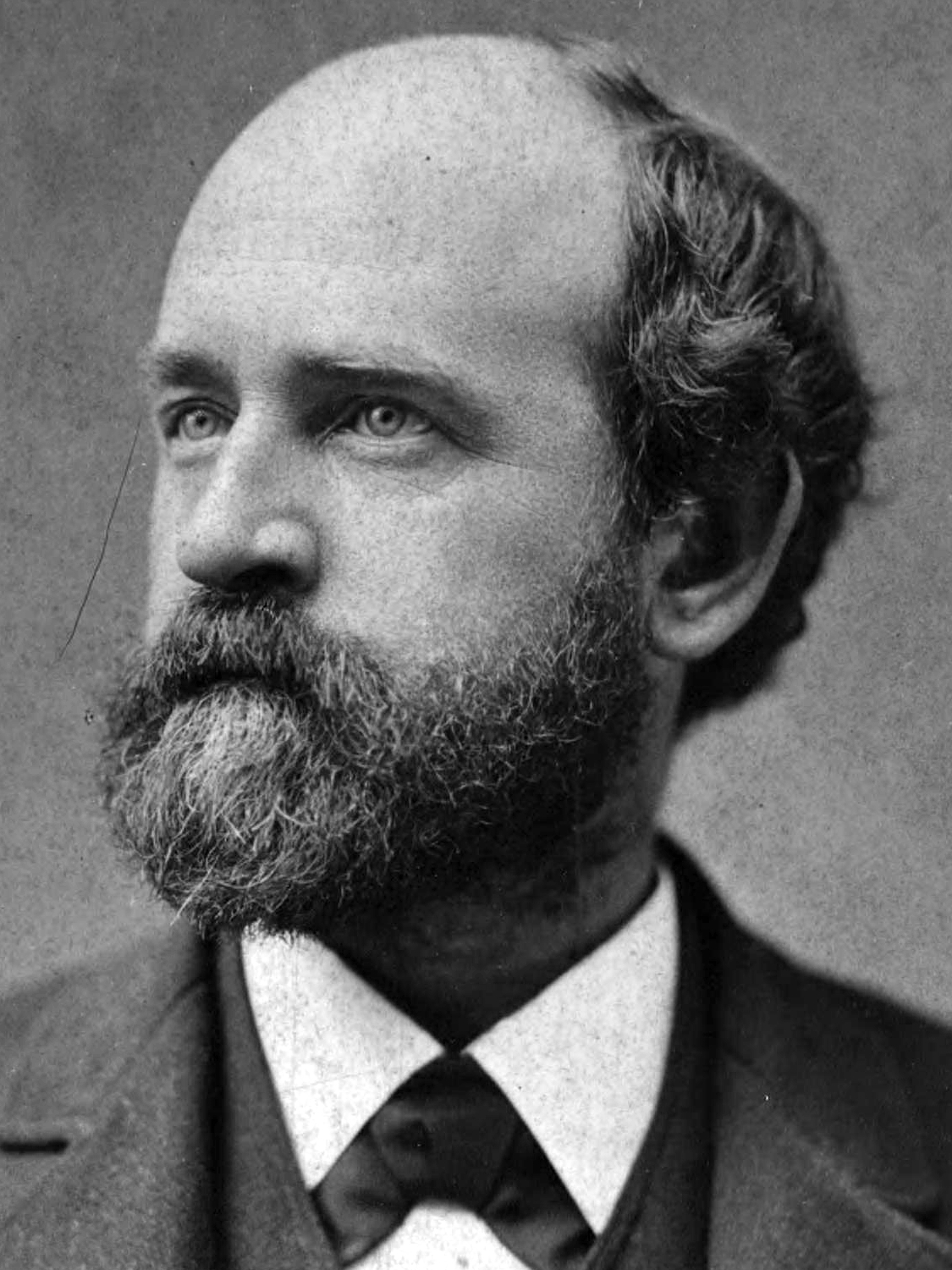
Nominee	John Franklin Miller	William T. Wallace	Henry George
Party	Republican	Democratic	Workingmen's Party of California
Senate	27	11	2
Percentage	67.50%	27.50%	5.00%
House	42	34	0
Percentage	53.16%	43.04%	0.00%
Senator before election
Newton Booth
Anti-Monopoly Party
Elected Senator
John Franklin Miller
Republican

The 1881 United States Senate election in California was held on January 12, 1881, by the California State Legislature to elect a U.S. senator (Class 1) to represent the State of California in the United States Senate. Republican Union Army General John Franklin Miller was elected over Democratic California chief justice William T. Wallace.

== Results ==
Election in the Senate
Party	Candidate	Votes	%
Republican	John Franklin Miller	27	67.50%
Democratic	William T. Wallace	11	27.50%
Workingmen's Party of California	Henry George	2	5.00%
Total votes		40	100.00%

Election in the Assembly
Party	Candidate	Votes	%
Republican	John Franklin Miller	42	53.16%
Democratic	William T. Wallace	34	43.04%
Democratic	Campbell Polson Berry	2	2.53%
Democratic	Caius T. Ryland	1	1.27%
Total votes		79	100.00%
