= 1871 United States Senate election in California =

- December 20, 1871

Majority vote of both houses needed to win
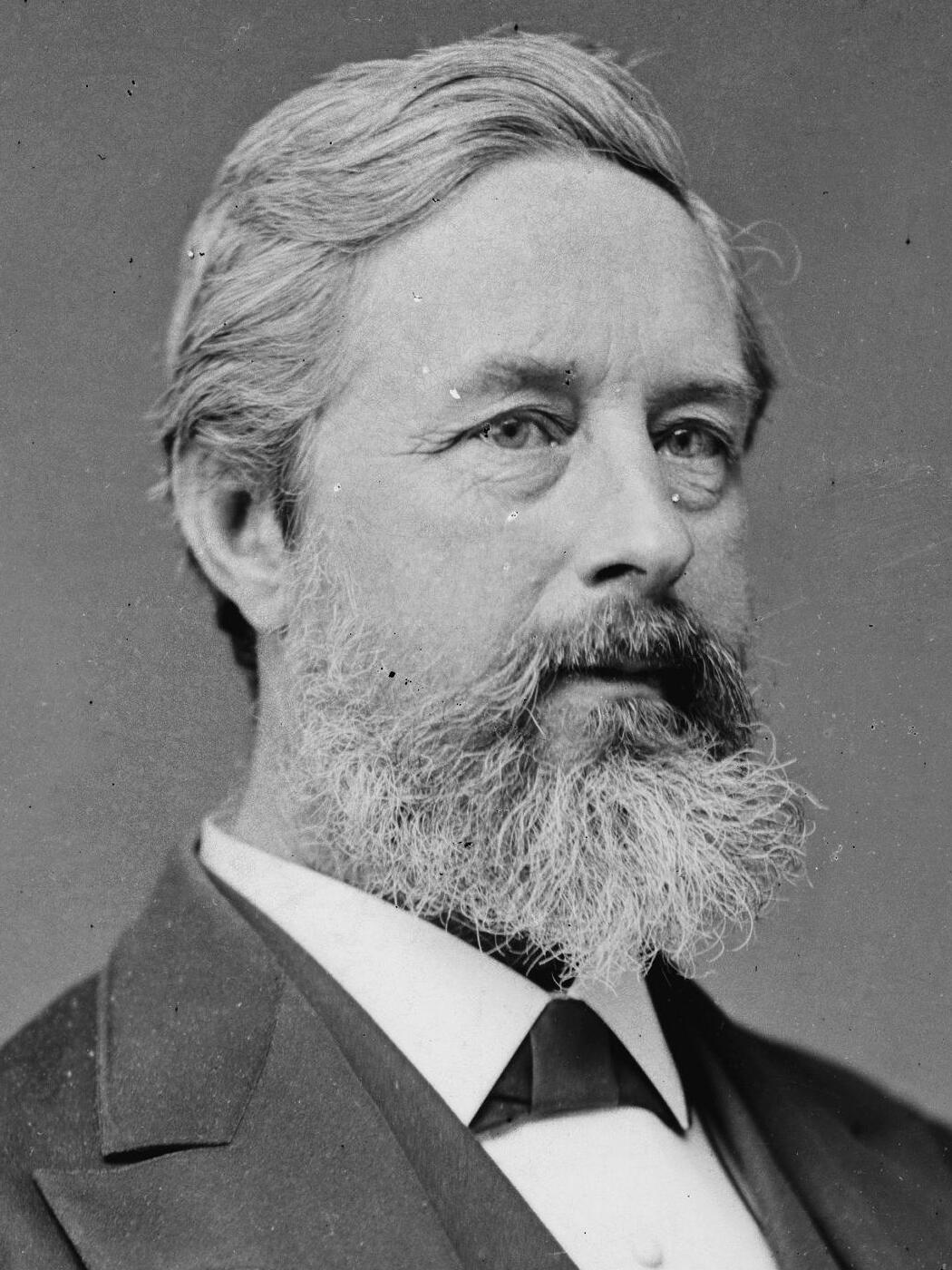

Nominee	Aaron A. Sargent	William T. Wallace
Party	Republican	Democratic
Joint session	72	46
Percentage	61.02%	38.98%
Senator before election
Cornelius Cole
Republican
Elected Senator
Aaron A. Sargent
Republican

The 1871 United States Senate election in California was held on December 20, 1871, by the California State Legislature to elect a U.S. senator (Class 3) to represent the State of California in the United States Senate. In a special joint session, Republican Congressman Aaron A. Sargent was elected over Democratic State Supreme Court Justice William T. Wallace.

== Results ==
Election in the legislature (joint session)
Party	Candidate	Votes	%
Republican	Aaron A. Sargent	72	61.02%
Democratic	William T. Wallace	46	38.98%
Total votes		118	100.00%
