= Maria Downey =

First lady of California (1860-1862)

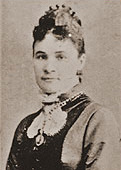

First Lady of California
- In role January 14, 1860 – January 10, 1862
- Governor: John G. Downey
- Preceded by: Sophie Latham
- Succeeded by: Jane Stanford

Personal details
- Born: María de Jesús Jacinta Guirado; September 10, 1836 Los Angeles, California, U.S.
- Died: January 29, 1883 (aged 46) Tehachapi, California, U.S.
- Spouse: John G. Downey (m. 1852)

Maria Downey (née María de Jesús Jacinta Guirado; 10 September 1836 – 29 January 1883), was First Lady of California, being wife of John Downey, Governor from 1860 to 1862.

== Life ==
María de Jesús Jacinta Guirado was born on 10 September 1836 in Los Angeles to Don Rafael Guirado and Vincenta Urquidez. Don Rafael had moved from Guaymas, Mexico to Whittier, California in 1833, and the family became influential in the area.

Maria married John G. Downey in 1852, a wealthy Irish immigrant. After John left office, he and Maria moved back to Los Angeles.

Maria died on 29 January 1883, in the Tehachapi train wreck, which her husband escaped with broken ribs. Her body was initially incorrectly shipped to San Francisco, being thought to be that of Mrs Cassell, while those sent to the undertaker in Los Angeles, were H. A. Oliver's.
