= Frank M. Pixley =

American politician (1825–1895)

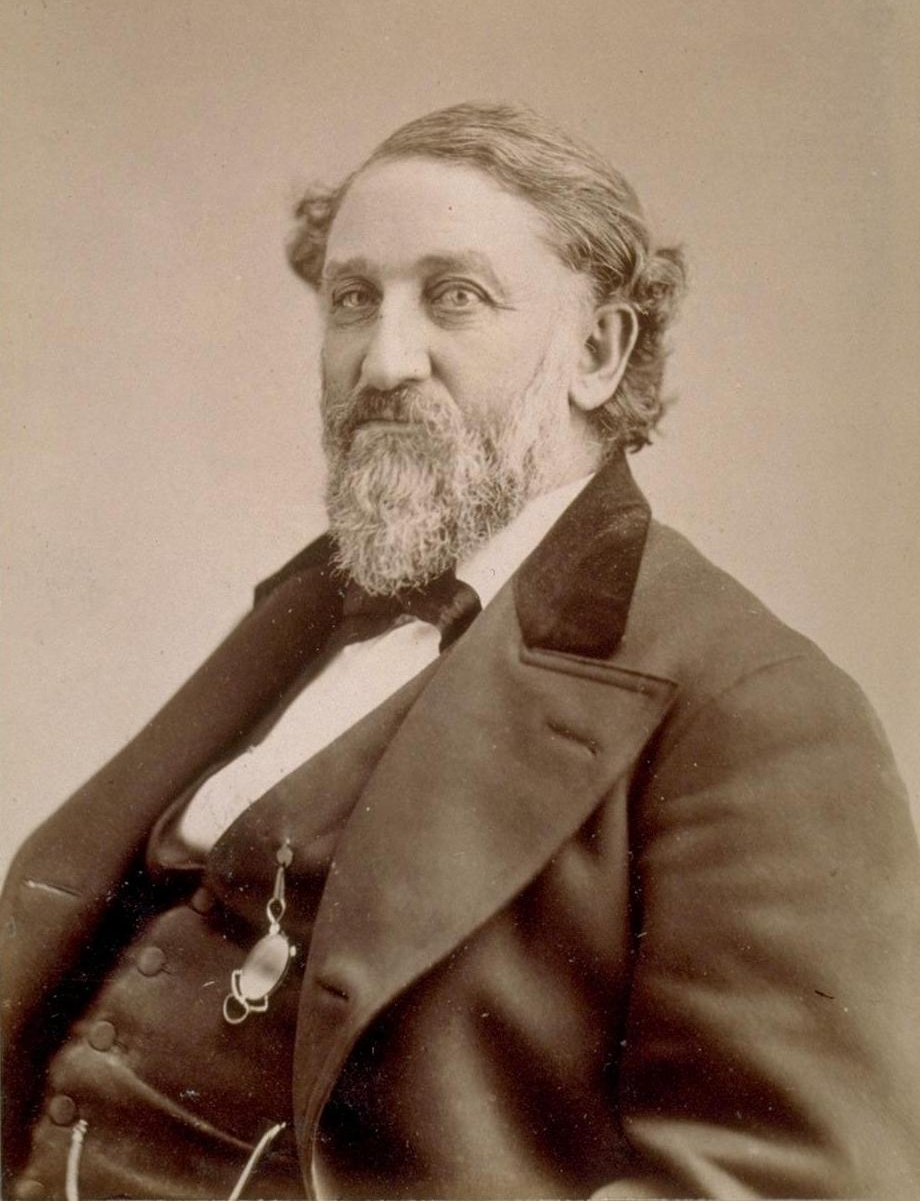
- Pixley c. 1878

8th Attorney General of California
- In office January 10, 1862 – December 10, 1863
- Governor: Leland Stanford
- Preceded by: Tom Williams
- Succeeded by: John G. McCullough

Member of the California State Assembly from the 5th district
- In office January 3, 1859 – January 2, 1860
- Preceded by: Multi-member district
- Succeeded by: Multi-member district

Personal details
- Born: January 31, 1825 Westmoreland, New York, U.S.
- Died: August 13, 1895 (aged 70) San Francisco, California, U.S.
- Party: Republican
- Spouse: Amelia Van Reynegom (m. 1853)

Frank Morrison Pixley (January 31, 1825 – August 13, 1895) was an American journalist, attorney, and politician who served as the 8th attorney general of California from 1862 to 1863. He co-founded The Argonaut in 1877 and served as its editor until 1891.

== Biography ==
Pixley was born in Westmoreland, Oneida County, New York. As a youth, he worked on the family farm and was first educated in the village academy, later at the Quaker school in Skaneateles (town), New York. He graduated from Hamilton College and studied law in Rochester, New York, he worked in the law office of Smith, Rochester and Smith. In 1847, he went to Michigan where he was admitted to practice law and qualified to appear before the state supreme court. Two years later he travelled to California during the Gold Rush, and spent two winters working mines on the Yuba River. He met and, in 1853, married Amelia Van Reynegom, daughter of Captain John and Margaret Van Reynegom, who had arrived to San Francisco in 1849 aboard her parents’ ship the Linda. The Pixleys lived in the North Beach area of San Francisco.

In 1858, although California was a Democratic state, Pixley was elected as a Republican to represent San Francisco in the California Assembly. In 1861, on the same Republican ticket as Governor Leland Stanford, he was elected the 8th Attorney General of California. His term ended in 1863.

He traveled to Washington, D.C. as a Civil War correspondent. However, he could not obtain a pass from Edwin Stanton who was the Secretary of War. At that he persuaded the United States Senator from California, John Conness, to let him use his congressional pass. With that he was able to spend three months in Civil War combat areas, and at one time riding his horse to the front line with the Second Connecticut Regiment. He visited Ulysses S. Grant in his headquarters. The General commented that Pixley had seen more warfare than many of his fighting men.

In 1868 he was the Republican candidate for Congress in California's First District, losing to incumbent Samuel Beach Axtell by more than 3500 votes. He briefly served as the United States Attorney for the District of California in 1869.

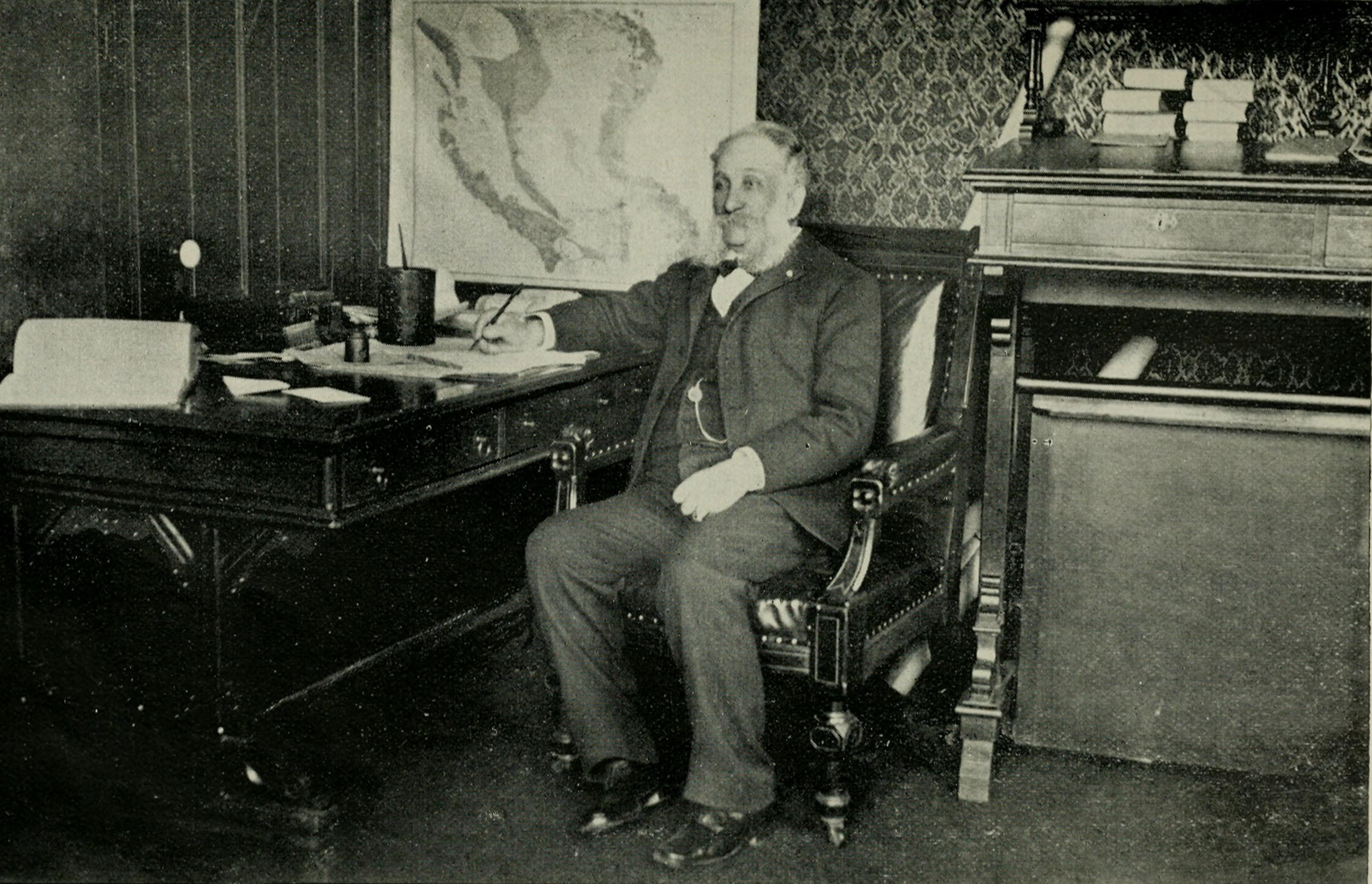
Pixley in The Argonaut editorial office c. 1892

Pixley joined with Frederic Somers to found The Argonaut in April 1877. The Argonaut was considered one of the most important publications in California and it had a great deal of political influence. He was friends with former Governor of California John G. Downey, and after the death of Downey's wife, introduced him to Yda Hillis Addis, a young woman who wrote for The Argonaut. Their relationship ended when the ex-governor proposed marriage to Addis. When Downey's sisters discovered the betrothal, they shanghaied the older gentleman to his native Ireland.

Pixley opposed immigration of Chinese people and voting rights for them.

Portrait by I. W. Taber c. 1885

In 1882 Governor George Clement Perkins appointed Pixley to the board of commissioners of San Francisco's Golden Gate Park. In 1888, Governor Robert Waterman appointed Pixley a trustee of the state Mining Bureau. In 1889 he was appointed to the board of the Yosemite Valley and Mariposa Grove Commission.

He died at age 70 in 1895 in San Francisco.

== Pixley, California ==
The town of Pixley, in Tulare County, California, is named after Frank Pixley. The town began as a real estate speculation in 1884. The investors, Darwin C. Allen and William B. Bradbury, knew their project would succeed only if the town was connected to the mainline of the Southern Pacific. They contacted Frank Pixley, a man whom they knew was a friend of Leland Stanford, president of the Southern Pacific. In 1886, Pixley joined with the original investors as a partner in the Pixley Townsite Company. The company purchased additional land in the vicinity. When The Southern Pacific extended its tracks to the Townsite, the town prospered. The terms of sale for the land was 25% down, the rest to be carried back for three years by the owners at 8 percent interest. The partners made a handsome profit.

Special railroad fares were offered to people in other areas of California and as far away as Boston in order to bring potential customers to see the new lands and the investment possibilities near Pixley.

The first house built in Pixley was for Emma Pixley, the widow of Frank Pixley's brother William. Her three sons and daughter lived in the home. Emma bought a quarter section of an adjoining piece of land where she farmed until they moved back to San Francisco.

Frank Pixley advertised the town named after him in his biweekly journal The Argonaut.

Legal offices
Preceded by Thomas H. Williams	Attorney General of California; 1862–1863	Succeeded by John G. McCullough
