= 1873 United States Senate election in California =

- December 23, 1873

Majority vote of both houses needed to win
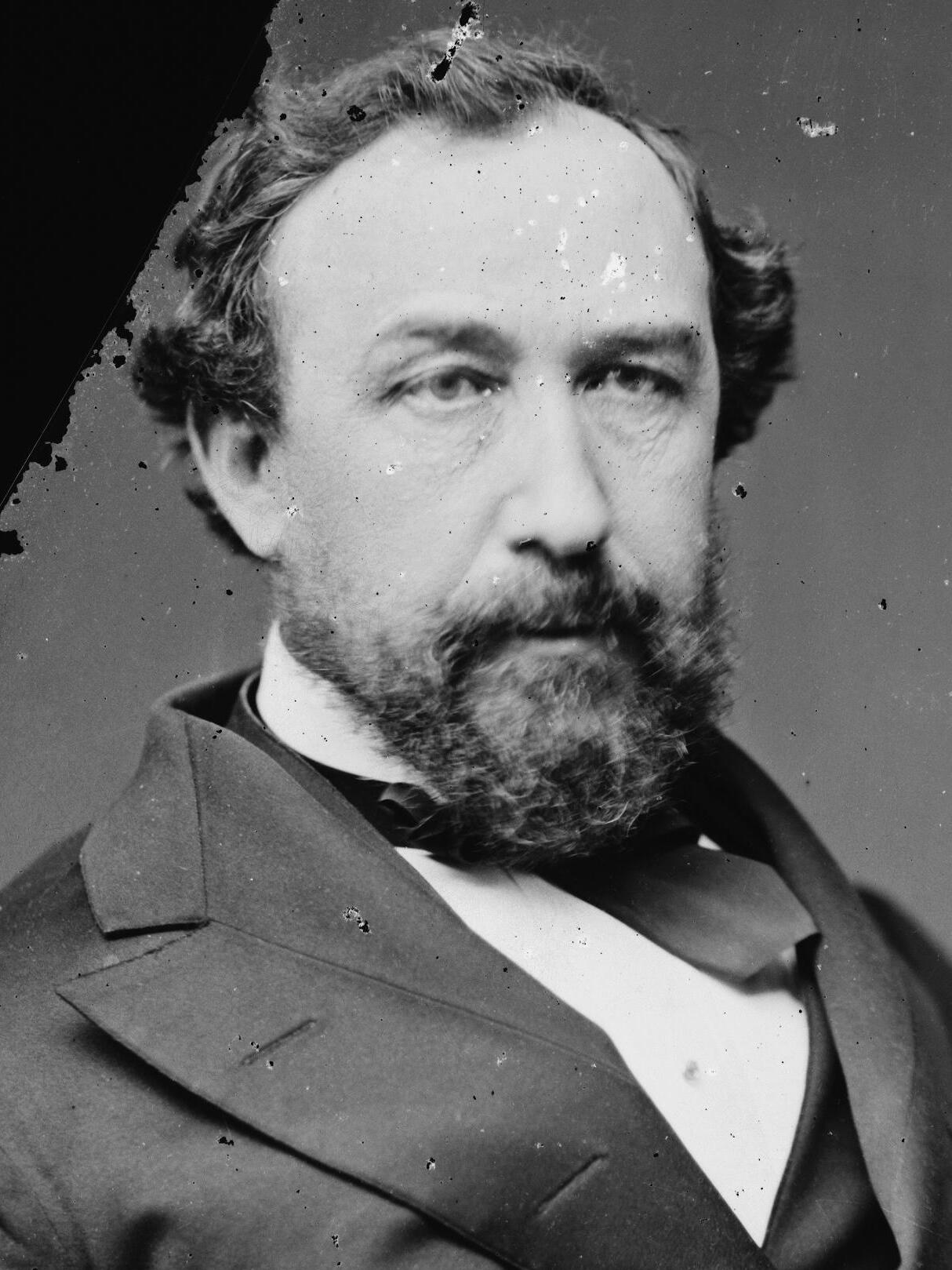

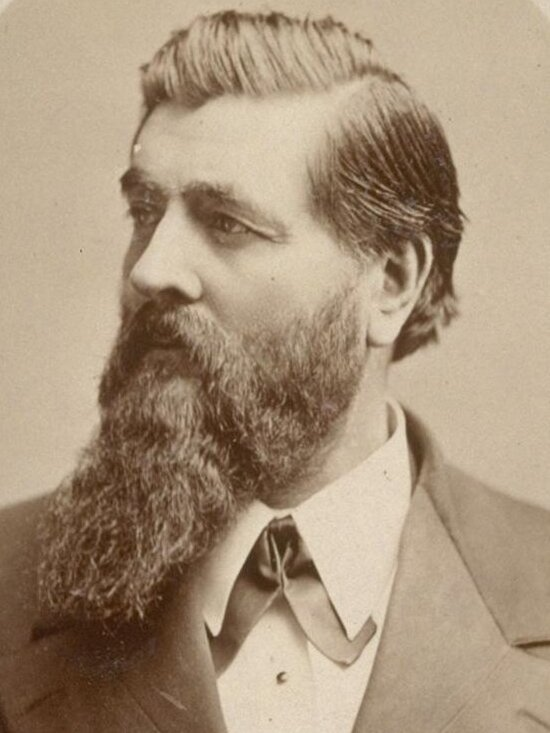

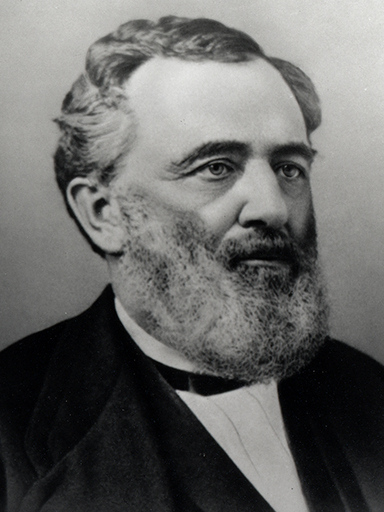
Nominee	Newton Booth	James T. Farley	Oscar L. Shafter
Party	Anti-Monopoly	Democratic	Republican
Joint session	61	37	20
Percentage	51.26%	31.09%	16.81%
Senator before election
John S. Hager
Democratic
Elected Senator
Newton Booth
Anti-Monopoly

The 1873 United States Senate election in California was held on December 23, 1873, by the California State Legislature to elect a U.S. senator (Class 1) to represent the State of California in the United States Senate. In a special joint session, Republican Governor Newton Booth was elected over Democratic State Senator James T. Farley and former Republican State Supreme Court Justice Oscar L. Shafter.

== Results ==
Election in the legislature (joint session)
Party	Candidate	Votes	%
Anti-Monopoly	Newton Booth	61	51.26%
Democratic	James T. Farley	37	31.09%
Republican	Oscar L. Shafter	20	16.81%
	Scattering	1	0.84%
Total votes		119	100.00%
