= Silas Sanderson =

American judge (1824-1886)

Silas Woodruff Sanderson
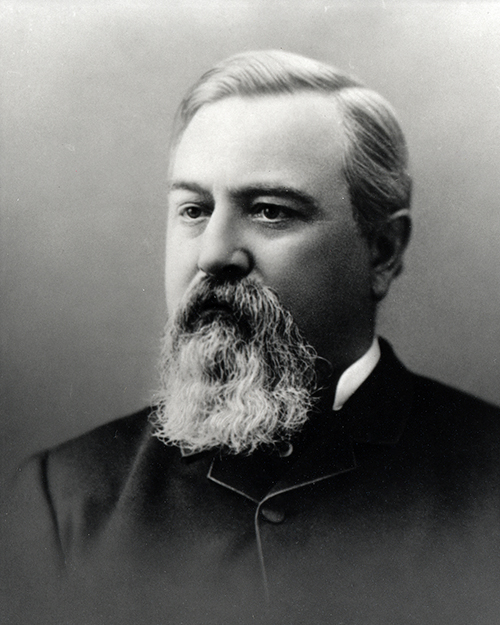

7th Chief Justice of the California Supreme Court
- In office January 2, 1864 – January 1866
- Appointed by: Elected
- Preceded by: Warner Cope
- Succeeded by: John Currey

Associate Justice of the California Supreme Court
- In office January 1866 – January 4, 1870
- Appointed by: Elected
- Preceded by: Elections under 1862 amendment to California constitution and 1863 enabling law
- Succeeded by: Jackson Temple

Personal details
- Born: April 16, 1824 Sandgate, Vermont, U.S.
- Died: June 24, 1886 (aged 62) San Francisco, California, U.S.
- Party: Republican
- Spouse: Margaret Beatty Ormsby (m. 1858)
- Education: Williams College; Union College

Silas Woodruff Sanderson (April 16, 1824 – June 24, 1886) was the seventh Chief Justice of California.

== Biography ==
Born in Sandgate, Vermont, Sanderson attended Burr Seminary, Williams College, and Union College, graduating from the last in 1846; he was soon admitted to the bar in New York state. He then moved to Florida where he went into practice with his older brother, John, in Jacksonville. In December 1847, Sanderson was named assistant secretary to the president of the Florida Senate. In August 1850, he visited Washington, D.C. Later in 1850, he sailed to California via the Strait of Magellan and settled in Coloma.

As a Democrat, Sanderson was elected district attorney in El Dorado County. In June 1861, during the American Civil War, he spoke against the secessionist sentiment at the Breckenridge Democratic Party convention. He became a Republican and backed Leland Stanford for Governor of California in the November 1861 election, serving on a committee to organize the inaugural ball. In November 1862, Sanderson ran on the Union branch of the Democratic Party ticket and was elected to the California State Assembly from El Dorado.

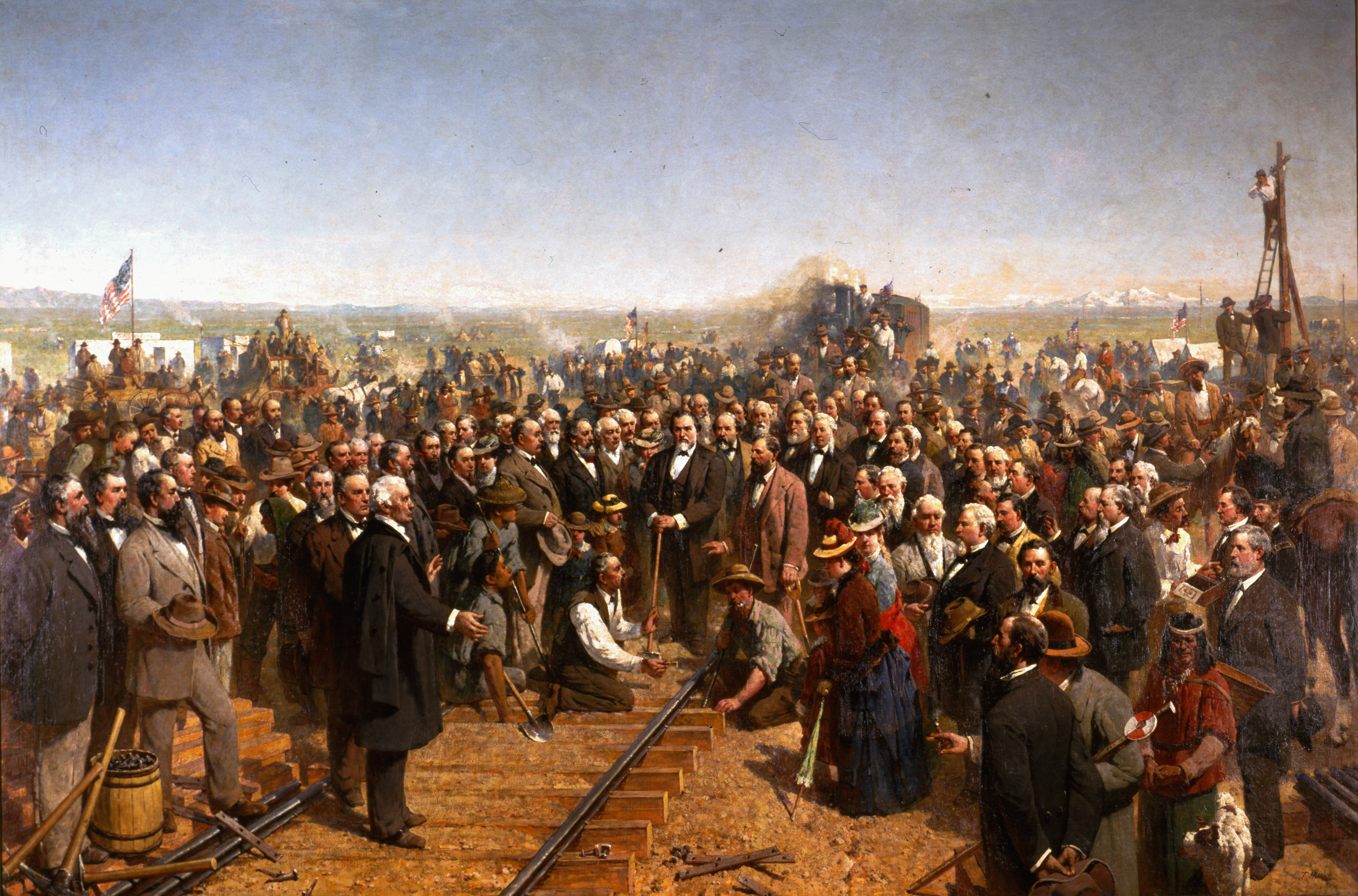
The Last Spike, 1869

The following year, under a constitutional amendment reorganizing the courts, all of the seats of the Supreme Court of California were open for election. In June 1863, Sanderson was nominated by the Republicans. In October 1863, he was elected, and by the drawing of lots among the new justices he received the short, two-year term. Under the rules of the court, the justice with the shortest term served as Chief Justice, and so he held the position from January 2, 1864, to January 1866, when his term expired. In November 1865, he beat Democrat H. H. Hartley, and was re-elected to the Court as an Associate Justice, serving from January 1866 to January 4, 1870.

In 1870, he resigned from the court to head the legal department at the Southern Pacific Railroad, a post he held for the next 16 years.

Sanderson died June 24, 1886, at his home in San Francisco. He was buried at Laurel Hill Cemetery, however by 1941, most of the remains had been moved to Colma, California.

== Personal life ==
On March 3, 1858, Sanderson married Margaret Beatty Ormsby (c. 1839 – October 21, 1913) of Sacramento, California. They had four daughters, including Sibyl Sanderson, a notable operatic soprano.

== See also ==
- List of justices of the Supreme Court of California
- Augustus Rhodes
- John Currey
- Lorenzo Sawyer
- Oscar L. Shafter

Legal offices
Preceded by Warner Cope	Chief Justice of California; 1864–1866	Succeeded by John Currey
Preceded by Elections under 1862 amendment to California constitution and 1863 enabling law	Associate Justice of the California Supreme Court; 1866–1870	Succeeded by Jackson Temple
