= Niles Searls =

American judge

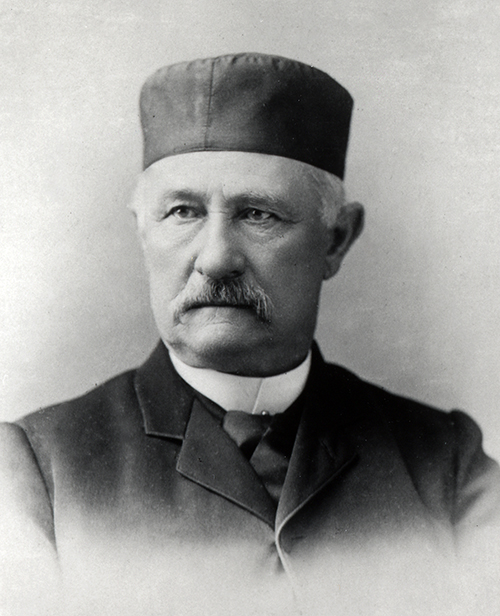

14th Chief Justice of California
- In office April 1887 – 1889
- Nominated by: Washington Bartlett
- Preceded by: Robert F. Morrison
- Succeeded by: William H. Beatty

Personal details
- Born: December 22, 1825 Coeymans, New York, U.S.
- Died: April 27, 1907 (aged 81) Berkeley, California, U.S.
- Spouse: Mary Corinthia Niles (m. 1953)
- Education: State and National Law School

Niles Searls (December 22, 1825 – April 27, 1907) was an attorney, politician, and the 14th Chief Justice of California.

== Early years ==
Searls, whose last name is also sometimes spelled as Searles, was born in Coeymans, New York. His father, Abraham Searls (born 1802), of English descent, worked as a farmer. His mother, Lydia Niles, was of Scottish descent. Searles had three brothers, Wilson (born 1823), John (born 1832), and Abraham (1844-1877/80, as well as four sisters, Johanna (born 1827), Alice (born 1829), Theresa (born 1835), and Lydia Jane (born 1839/40).

When the family moved to Prince Edward, Ontario, Canada, Searls attended school in Wellington for five years before returning to New York to study at Rensselaerville Academy for the next three years. From here, he spent a year in the law office of O.H. Chittenden, preparing himself for the practice of law before attending John W. Fowler's newly established State and National Law School with fellow students Chancellor Hartson and Tim N. Machin. He was admitted to the New York bar May 2, 1848.

"Heavy rains, - The wagons were often imbedded in the loose murky earth to their hubs. Tongues were broken, harness torn, mules lames, and to all appearances, we were nearly shipwrecked. After three hours of hard swearing, we reached the high ground and encamped for the night." (Excerpt from Searls' diary, May 19, 1849)

—

Searls travelled to Kentucky and Illinois before settling for a short time in Missouri to practice law. When he decided to join the California Gold Rush, he chose the wagon train company endorsed by the Daily Missouri Republican, the Pioneer Line. He traveled with his friend from law school, Charles Mulford. Arriving in California in October 1849, they mined and traded.

== Career ==
In 1850, he settled in the town of Nevada (which later became known as Nevada City) where he practiced law. Two years later, he was elected district attorney of Nevada County. Elected on the Know Nothing ticket, from 1855 through 1862, he was a judge of the 14th judicial district.

In 1864, Searls moved back to New York and became a farmer for the next six years before returning to his mountain home in California, and retiring. However, in 1877, Searls was elected to represent Nevada County in the California Senate, and later became Chairman of the California Debris Commission.

At the 1884 Democratic National Convention, Searls nominated General William Rosecrans for Vice President of the United States, but Thomas A. Hendricks went on to be selected as the running mate to Grover Cleveland.

Searls was appointed California State Supreme Court Commissioner in 1885, serving in this office until April 19, 1887, when he became the 14th Chief Justice of California. Defeated for re-election in November 1888, he became a Supreme Court Commissioner for a second time during the period of 1894-1897.

Searls sat on the board of directors of the Nevada County Narrow Gauge Railroad.

== Personal life ==
In 1853, Searls returned to New York to marry his first cousin, Mary Corinthia Niles (1830–1910) of Rensselaerville, New York, and brought her back to Nevada City, traveling by steamer with their friends, Charles Mulford and his new bride, Deb. They had two children, one of whom, Fred Searls (born 1854) engaged in the practice of law, and the other was a mechanical engineer.

He kept a diary about his experiences in 1869 during an arduous rail trip from New York to California and wrote a book about it, "Coast to coast by railroad: The journey of Niles Searls--May, 1869".

Searls was vice president of the Society of California Pioneers. Along with Aaron A. Sargent, Searls was a Freemason of the Nevada Lodge, No. 13.

He retired to Berkeley, California in 1899, and died at his home eight years later. He was a Protestant.

Searls' grandson, Fred Searls, Jr., and great-grandson, Carroll Searls, were all attorneys. Fred Searls, Jr. was president of the international conglomerate mining concern, Newmont Mining Corporation, which operated, among many others, the Empire-North Star mine complex in Nevada County, California, after 1929-1950s. His great-grandson, Frederick Searls (1912–1998), also an attorney, was Vice President of Pacific Gas and Electric Company.

Searls' first cousin, and Mary's brother, Addison Niles, was an Associate Justice on the California Supreme Court during the period of 1872-1880.

== Historic recognition ==
Built in 1872, Searls' brick, two room, single story law office on Church Street, across from the Nevada County Courthouse, was converted into the Searls Library, containing the historical documents collection of the Nevada County Historical Society.

== Partial bibliography ==
- Niles Searls diary : ms. S, 1849 May 9-Oct. 1.
- (1869), Coast to coast by railroad: the journey of Niles Searls--May, 1869..Worldcat.org.

== See also ==
- List of justices of the Supreme Court of California

Legal offices
Preceded by Robert F. Morrison	Chief Justice of California; 1887–1889	Succeeded by William H. Beatty
