= 1859 California gubernatorial election =

- September 7, 1859
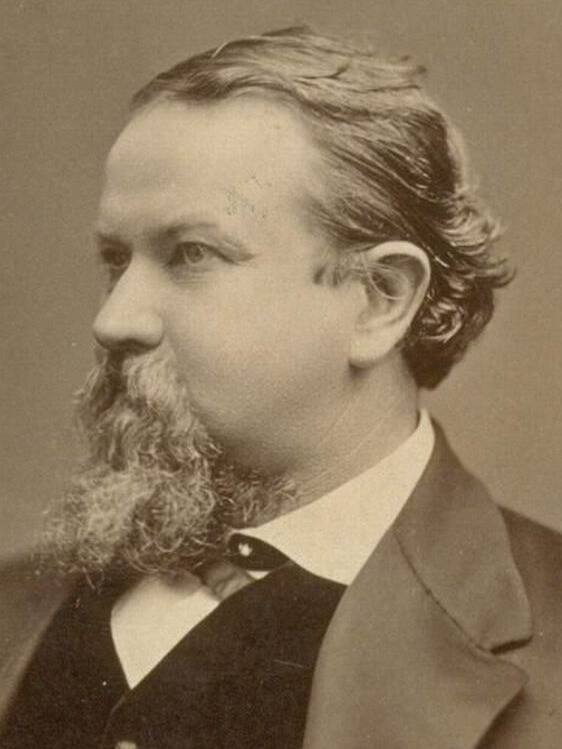

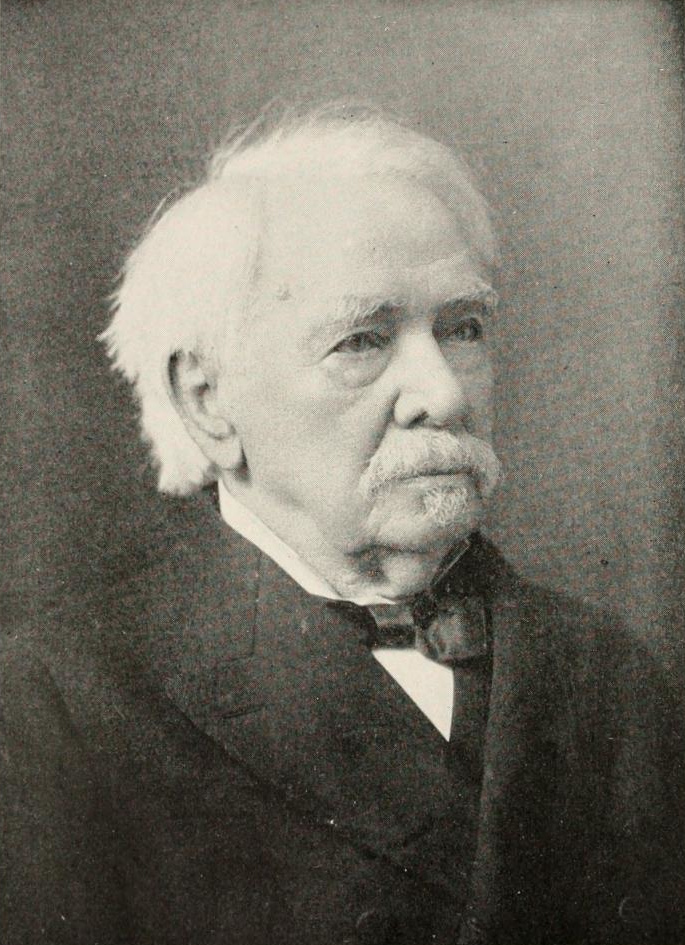

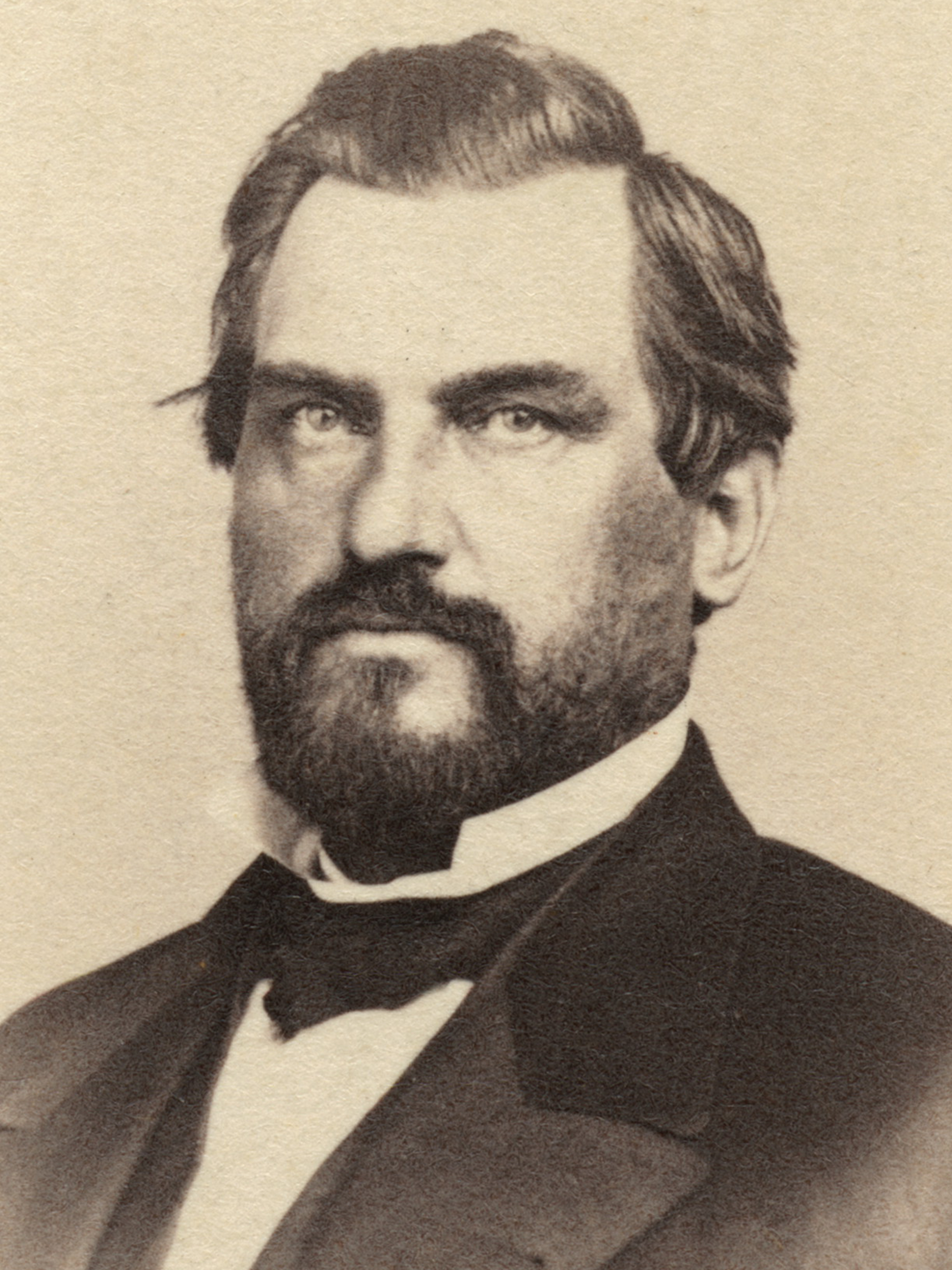
Nominee	Milton Latham	John Currey	Leland Stanford
Party	Lecompton Democratic	Anti-Lecompton Democratic	Republican
Popular vote	61,352	31,298	10,110
Percentage	59.13%	31.13%	9.74%
- County Results; Latham: 40–50% 50–60% 60–70% 70–80% 80–90% >90% Currey: 50–60%
Governor before election
John B. Weller
Lecompton Democratic
Elected Governor
Milton Latham
Lecompton Democratic

The 1859 California gubernatorial election was held on September 7, 1859, to elect the governor of California.

Since the beginning of the 1850s, issues regarding slavery had effectively split the state Democratic Party. Initially divided by pro-slavery Chivalrists and anti-slavery Free Soilers, by 1857, the party had split into the Lecompton and Anti-Lecompton factions. Lecompton members supported the Kansas Lecompton Constitution, a document explicitly allowing slavery into the territory, while Anti-Lecompton faction members were in opposition to slavery's expansion. The violence between supporting and opposition forces led to the period known as Bleeding Kansas. Splits in the Democratic Party, as well as the power vacuum created by the collapse of the Whig Party, helped facilitate the rise of the American Party both in state and federal politics. In particular, state voters voted Know-Nothings into the California State Legislature, and elected J. Neely Johnson as governor in the 1855 general elections.

During the 1859 general elections, Lecompton Democrats voted Latham, who had briefly lived in the American South, as their nominee for governor. Anti-Lecomptons in turn selected John Currey as their nominee. The infant Republican Party, running in its first gubernatorial election, selected businessman Leland Stanford as its nominee. To make matters more complicated, after the election, Senator David C. Broderick, an Anti-Lecompton Democrat, was killed in a duel by slavery supporter and former state Supreme Court Justice David Terry on September 13.

== Results ==
California gubernatorial election, 1859
Party	Candidate	Votes	%	±%
Lecompton Democratic	Milton Latham	61,352	59.13%	+59.13%
Anti-Lecompton Democratic	John Currey	31,298	31.13%	−25.58%
Republican	Leland Stanford	10,110	9.74%	−12.72%
Majority		29,054	28.00%	
Total votes		103,760	100.00%	
Lecompton Democratic hold		Swing	-6.25%	

=== Results by county ===
County	Milton Latham Lecompton		John Currey Anti-Lecompton		Leland Stanford Republican		Margin		Total votes cast
County	#	%	#	%	#	%	#	%	Total votes cast
Alameda	1,066	52.54%	664	32.73%	299	14.74%	402	19.81%	2,029
Amador	2,023	62.44%	985	30.40%	232	7.16%	1,038	32.04%	3,240
Butte	1,915	48.67%	1,666	42.34%	354	9.00%	249	6.33%	3,935
Calaveras	3,275	69.67%	1,391	29.59%	35	0.74%	1,884	40.08%	4,701
Colusa	541	74.93%	166	22.99%	15	2.08%	375	51.94%	722
Contra Costa	805	65.77%	378	30.88%	41	3.35%	427	34.89%	1,224
Del Norte	392	73.13%	126	23.51%	18	3.36%	266	49.63%	536
El Dorado	3,096	52.32%	2,413	40.78%	408	6.90%	683	11.54%	5,917
Fresno	359	96.77%	11	2.96%	1	0.27%	348	93.80%	371
Humboldt	397	46.60%	372	43.66%	83	9.74%	25	2.93%	852
Klamath	607	83.38%	120	16.48%	1	0.14%	487	66.90%	728
Los Angeles	1,916	87.69%	49	2.24%	220	10.07%	1,696 (Note: Margin over Stanford)	77.62%	2,185
Marin	467	76.68%	75	12.32%	67	11.00%	392	64.37%	609
Mariposa	1,462	86.92%	212	12.60%	8	0.48%	1,250	74.32%	1,682
Mendocino	730	88.38%	85	10.29%	11	1.33%	645	78.09%	826
Merced	231	87.50%	32	12.12%	1	0.38%	199	75.38%	264
Monterey	495	69.13%	175	24.44%	46	6.42%	320	44.69%	716
Napa	810	46.85%	905	52.34%	14	0.81%	-95	-5.49%	1,729
Nevada	3,185	50.56%	2,534	40.22%	581	9.22%	651	10.33%	6,300
Placer	2,326	53.61%	1,117	25.74%	896	20.65%	1,209	27.86%	4,339
Plumas	882	51.16%	649	37.65%	193	11.19%	233	13.52%	1,724
Sacramento	3,526	54.82%	2,678	41.64%	228	3.54%	848	13.18%	6,432
San Bernardino	532	92.20%	6	1.04%	39	6.76%	493	85.44%	577
San Diego	259	93.50%	1	0.36%	17	6.14%	242	87.36%	277
San Francisco	4,747	44.29%	2,943	27.46%	3,027	28.24%	1,720	16.05%	10,717
San Joaquin	1,806	62.43%	878	30.35%	209	7.22%	928	32.08%	2,893
San Luis Obispo	284	82.56%	30	8.72%	30	8.72%	254	73.84%	344
San Mateo	420	44.54%	418	44.33%	105	11.13%	2	0.21%	943
Santa Barbara	431	92.49%	0	0.00%	35	7.51%	396	84.98%	466
Santa Clara	1,407	58.63%	367	15.29%	626	26.08%	781	32.54%	2,400
Santa Cruz	496	45.21%	451	41.11%	150	13.67%	45	4.10%	1,097
Shasta	1,456	50.28%	1,432	49.45%	8	0.28%	24	0.83%	2,896
Sierra	2,814	58.93%	1,666	34.89%	295	6.18%	1,148	24.04%	4,775
Siskiyou	2,159	61.60%	1,303	37.18%	43	1.23%	856	24.42%	3,505
Solano	1,172	56.16%	827	39.63%	88	4.22%	345	16.53%	2,087
Sonoma	1,981	62.04%	1,148	35.95%	64	2.00%	833	26.09%	3,193
Stanislaus	389	76.57%	106	20.87%	13	2.56%	283	55.71%	508
Sutter	695	73.86%	159	16.90%	87	9.25%	536	56.96%	941
Tehama	770	85.84%	92	10.26%	35	3.90%	678	75.59%	897
Trinity	1,285	60.67%	829	39.14%	4	0.19%	456	21.53%	2,118
Tulare	821	91.73%	63	7.04%	11	1.23%	758	84.69%	895
Tuolumne	3,723	68.58%	737	13.58%	969	17.85%	2,754	50.73%	5,429
Yolo	757	54.42%	568	40.83%	66	4.74%	189	13.59%	1,391
Yuba	2,442	56.14%	1,471	33.82%	437	10.05%	971	22.32%	4,350
Total	61,352	59.13%	32,298	31.13%	10,110	9.74%	29,054	28.00%	103,760

==== Counties that flipped from Republican to Democratic ====
- Alameda
- San Francisco
