= Sophie Latham =

First Lady of California

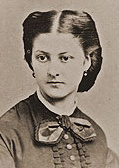

First Lady of California
- In role January 9, 1860 – January 14, 1860
- Governor: Milton Latham
- Preceded by: Lizzie Weller
- Succeeded by: Maria Downey

Personal details
- Born: Sophie Birdsall c. 1835 Yates County, New York, U.S.
- Died: September 10, 1867 (aged 31–32)
- Spouse: Milton Latham (m. 1853)

Sophie Latham (née Birdsall; c. 1835 – 10 September 1867) was First Lady of California as wife of Milton Latham, Governor from January 9 to 14, 1860

== Life ==
Latham was born around 1835 in Yates County, New York, to Lewis A. Birdsall and Mary Jane Lee.

Sophie was a favorite of Sacramento and San Francisco society, and was known by the soubriquet the "Belle of the Prairie." In 1853, her father, Lewis, was appointed as the first Superintendent of the San Francisco Mint. Sophie married Milton Latham in San Francisco, on October 1, 1853. They had no children. Milton was governor for five days before he was elected to the United States Senate, filling the vacancy created by David Broderick's death. Milton was not re-elected and they moved back to San Francisco.

Latham died September 10, 1867 and was buried at the Laurel Hill Cemetery in San Francisco. Both Sophie and Milton were moved to the Cypress Lawn Memorial Park in Colma around 1940, when the cemetery was closed due to an ordinance prohibiting graveyards within city limits.
