= John Currey =

American judge

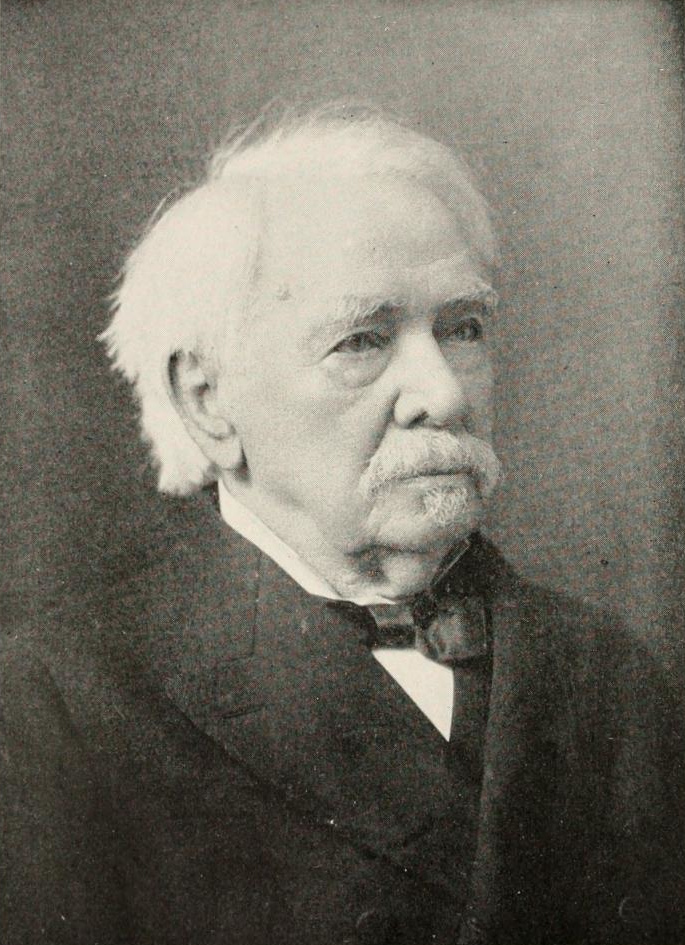

8th Chief Justice of California
- In office January 1, 1866 – January 1, 1868
- Preceded by: Silas Sanderson
- Succeeded by: Lorenzo Sawyer

Associate Justice of the California Supreme Court
- In office January 1, 1864 – December 31, 1865
- Preceded by: Elections under 1862 amendment to California constitution and 1863 enabling law
- Succeeded by: Royal Sprague

Personal details
- Born: October 4, 1814 Westchester County, New York
- Died: December 18, 1912 (aged 98) Dixon, California
- Party: Democratic
- Spouse: Cornelia Elizabeth Scott (m. 1845; died 1877)
- Education: Wesleyan University (BA)
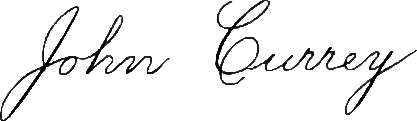
- Signature

John Currey (October 4, 1814 – December 18, 1912) was the eighth Chief Justice of California, and candidate for Governor of California in 1859.

== Biography ==
John Currey was born in Westchester County, New York, in 1814, and died in Dixon, California, in 1912. He attended Wesleyan University in Middletown, Connecticut (class of 1842).

Currey came to California in 1849, eventually settling down in Benicia, where he established a successful law practice. Among his clients was Juan Manuel Vaca, owner of a large tract of land, a Mexican land grant near the present-day city that bears his name: Vacaville.

In 1850 and 1852, Millard Fillmore nominated him to be a district court judge in California, but both nominations were unsuccessful; the United States Senate voted to reject the first nomination and took no action on the second.

In 1859 the Anti-Lecompton Democratic Party selected Currey as their candidate for Governor of California. The rival faction, Lecompton Democrats, chose Milton Latham as their candidate. The Republican Party ran its first California gubernatorial candidate in 1859, businessman and railroad tycoon, and later Governor Leland Stanford. Despite the Democratic party split in California in the 1850s and the surge of the new Republican Party's candidate in the campaign, Latham won the election, garnering sixty percent of the vote.

After losing in his run for governor, Currey would find other promising opportunities for office. In 1863, several vacancies on the Supreme Court occurred. The departed justices included the sixth Chief Justice Stephen Johnson Field, who was appointed by President Abraham Lincoln to the U.S. Supreme Court, becoming the first Californian to serve on the high court.

In 1863, a constitutional amendment meant all of the seats of the Supreme Court of California were open for election. Running as a "union" party candidate at the height of the American Civil War, Currey was elected to the Supreme Court of California, taking his seat in January 1864. His term ended January 1, 1868. After serving as associate justice, Currey became Chief Justice on January 1, 1866, when Silas Sanderson resigned, on the rule that the member of the court with the shortest remaining term serves. (He was defeated in his re-election bid, for the newly established ten-year term, by associate justice Augustus Rhodes and was therefore succeeded as Chief Justice by Lorenzo Sawyer).

Having served four years on the court, including two as chief justice, Currey lost the 1867 election to Royal Sprague and retired to his home in San Francisco. When the 1906 San Francisco earthquake and fire left him homeless he moved to his estate north of Dixon in Solano County, in the Sacramento Valley. With his sons, Montgomery Scott Currey and Robert John Currey, he lived out his last years there.

== Personal life ==
In 1845, Currey married Cornelia Elizabeth Scott, who died April 20, 1877.

== See also ==
- List of justices of the Supreme Court of California
- Augustus Rhodes
- Silas Sanderson
- Lorenzo Sawyer
- Oscar L. Shafter

Party political offices
Preceded by John B. Weller	Democratic nominee for Governor of California; 1859	Succeeded by John Conness
Legal offices
Preceded by Silas Sanderson	Chief Justice of California; 1866–1868	Succeeded by Lorenzo Sawyer
Preceded by Elections under 1862 amendment to California constitution and 1863 enabling law	Associate Justice of the California Supreme Court; 1864–1866	Succeeded by Royal Sprague
