= Isaac S. Belcher =

American judge (1825–1898)

Isaac Sawyer Belcher
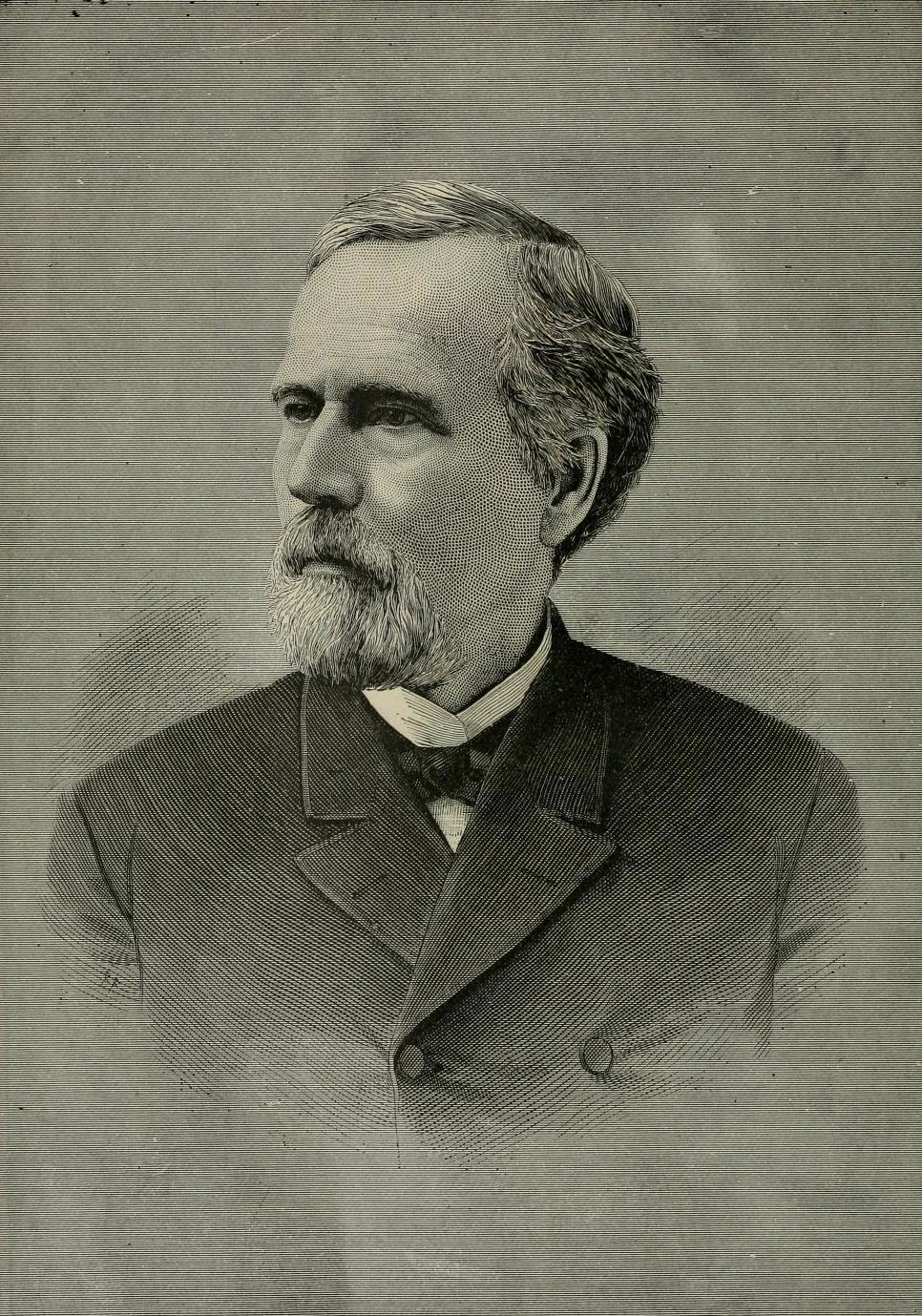

Associate Justice of the California Supreme Court
- In office March 4, 1872 – January 5, 1874
- Appointed by: Governor Newton Booth
- Preceded by: Royal Sprague
- Succeeded by: Elisha W. McKinstry

Delegate to the Second Constitutional Convention of California
- In office September 28, 1878 – March 3, 1879
- Preceded by: Office established
- Succeeded by: Office abolished
- Constituency: 3rd congressional district

Personal details
- Born: February 27, 1825 Stockbridge, Vermont, U.S.
- Died: November 30, 1898 (aged 74) San Francisco, California, U.S.
- Spouse: Adeline Johnson (m. 1861)
- Education: University of Vermont (B.A.)

Isaac Sawyer Belcher (February 27, 1825 – November 30, 1898) was an American attorney and an associate justice of the Supreme Court of California from March 4, 1872, to January 5, 1874.

== Biography ==
Belcher was born in Stockbridge, Vermont, the second of three sons of Samuel Belcher, a farmer. He attended school off season from his work on his father's farm. In 1842, he enrolled in the University of Vermont in Burlington, from which he graduated in 1846. When he was 21, he entered the law office of J. W. D. Parker and read law. In 1852, he was admitted to the bar of the supreme court of Vermont.

On June 16, 1853, he arrived in California after spending a month in Oregon. He settled on the Yuba River during the Gold Rush but resumed a law career. He moved to Marysville, California in 1855 and opened a law practice. From 1856 to 1857, Belcher served as District attorney for Yuba County, California having run on the American Party or Know Nothings ticket. In June 1863, he was nominated by the Union Party and elected as a district judge of the Tenth Judicial District, serving from 1865 to 1869 both there and in the 21st District, as well.

On March 4, 1872, Governor Newton Booth appointed Belcher as an associate justice of the Supreme Court to fill the vacancy caused by the death of Chief Justice Royal Sprague. In the October 1873 election, Belcher did not run, and Elisha W. McKinstry was elected to the seat.

In June 1878, Belcher was nominated by the Democratic Party and served as a member of the convention in September 1878 which framed the existing Constitution of California. In 1879, Belcher ran for another term when all seats of the Supreme Court were up for election due to the new constitution. In June 1879, he was nominated by the Republican Party on the same ticket as Milton H. Myrick but lost the election.

Afterwards, Belcher was a commissioner for the Supreme Court from March 16, 1885, till his death on November 30, 1898.

== Civic activities ==
Belcher served as an original trustee for Stanford University. He was also a trustee for the California State Library.

== Personal life ==
In 1861, he visited his home in Vermont and met Adeline N. Johnson of Augusta, Maine. They married, settled in Oakland, and had a daughter and three sons, one of whom, Richard, entered the practice of law.

Issac's two brothers, William C. and Edward A. Belcher, both became attorneys in California. Isaac practiced law with his older brother, William, in the firm of Belcher & Belcher. In 1893, Edward was appointed by Governor Henry Markham as a judge of the San Francisco County Superior Court.

== See also ==
- List of justices of the Supreme Court of California

Political offices
Preceded by Royal Sprague	Associate Justice of the California Supreme Court; 1872–1874	Succeeded by Elisha W. McKinstry
