= Royal Sprague =

American judge

Royal Tyler Sprague
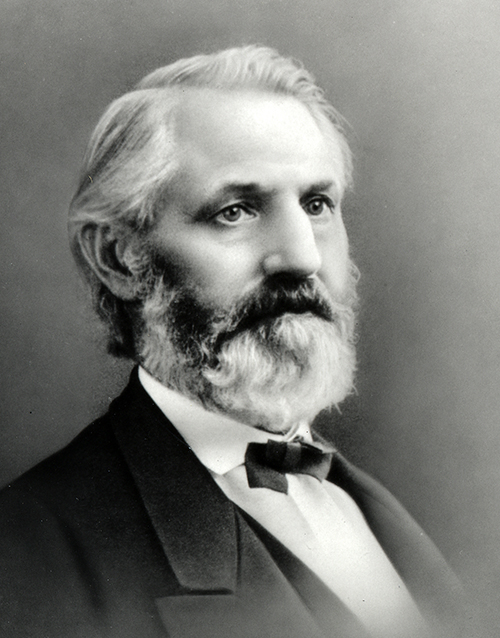
- Sprague in 1870

11th Chief Justice of California
- In office January 2, 1872 – February 24, 1872
- Preceded by: Augustus Rhodes
- Succeeded by: William T. Wallace

Associate Justice of the Supreme Court of California
- In office January 3, 1867 – January 1, 1872
- Appointed by: Direct election
- Preceded by: John Currey
- Succeeded by: Isaac S. Belcher

4th President Pro Tempore of the California State Senate
- In office January 1855 – December 1855
- Preceded by: Benjamin F. Keene
- Succeeded by: Delos R. Ashley

Member of the California State Senate
- In office 1853–1855
- Constituency: 13th district
- In office 1851–1853
- Constituency: 18th district

Personal details
- Born: January 23, 1814 New Haven, Vermont, US
- Died: February 24, 1872 (aged 58) Sacramento, California, US
- Spouse: Francis Blocksom (m. 1844)

Royal Tyler Sprague (January 23, 1814 – February 24, 1872) was an American judge who served as the 11th Chief Justice of California.

== Biography ==
Sprague taught elementary school in Potsdam, New York and later opened a school in Zanesville, Ohio. In 1838 he began to study law and was admitted to the bar in Ohio. The finding of gold in the Sierra Nevada prompted Sprague to become a "Forty-Niner". After arriving in California in September 1849, Sprague worked a claim on Clear Creek on the Sacramento River. He settled in Reading's Springs, now Shasta, California, and once again became an attorney.

In 1852, he was elected to the California State Senate representing the 18th District and was later reelected from the 13th District. In 1855 served as its President pro tempore.

In 1867, Sprague was elected to the Supreme Court of California as a Democrat; he was chosen to be Chief Justice in January 1872 and died the next month. He is interred in Sacramento Historic City Cemetery.

A collection of his journals is in the Bancroft Library at the University of California, Berkeley.

== Personal life ==
On, May 30, 1844, he married Francis Blocksom at Muskingum, Ohio. In 1852, Sprague returned to Ohio briefly to retrieve his wife and their family; they returned to California with him. The couple had four children: Anna Maria Sprague (1845–1879); Arthur Hale Sprague (1848–1922); Ella Sprague (1853-1855); and Frances Royal Sprague (1864–1957).

== See also ==
- List of justices of the Supreme Court of California
- Joseph B. Crockett
- William T. Wallace
- Jackson Temple

Legal offices
Preceded by Augustus L. Rhodes	Chief Justice of California; 1872	Succeeded by William T. Wallace
Preceded by John Currey	Associate Justice of the California Supreme Court; 1867 - 1872	Succeeded by Isaac S. Belcher
Political offices
Preceded by Benjamin F. Keene	President Pro Tempore California State Senate; 1862	Succeeded by Delos R. Ashley
