= Augustus Rhodes =

American judge

Augustus Loring Rhodes
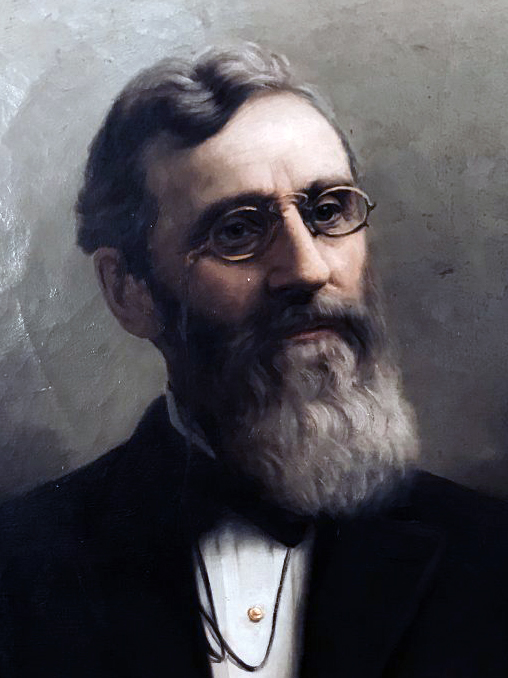

10th Chief Justice of California
- In office January 1, 1870 – January 1, 1872
- Nominated by: Direct election
- Preceded by: Lorenzo Sawyer
- Succeeded by: Royal Sprague

Associate Justice of the Supreme Court of California
- In office 1864–1870
- In office 1872–1880

Personal details
- Born: May 25, 1821 Oneida County, New York, U.S.
- Died: October 23, 1918 (aged 97) San Jose, Santa Clara County, California, U.S.
- Spouse: Elizabeth Greene Cavins (m. 1846)
- Education: Hamilton College

Augustus Loring Rhodes (May 25, 1821 – October 23, 1918) was the 10th Chief Justice of California.

== Biography ==
Educated at Hamilton College, Rhodes studied law and then moved to Bloomfield, Indiana, being admitted to the bar there in 1846. He served one term as the prosecuting attorney for the circuit court (1849), and departed for California in 1854. Settling in San Jose, he became district attorney in 1859 and then State Senator for the 4th district in 1860.

In 1863, a constitutional amendment meant all of the seats of the Supreme Court of California were open for election. In October 1863, Rhodes was elected to the Supreme Court of California, and served from January 2, 1864, until 1880. He served as the 10th Chief Justice from 1870 to 1872. His first term expired January 1, 1872, and the Court referred the issue of whether he would continue to serve as Chief Justice to a panel of three San Francisco attorneys. They decided that Article 6, Section 3, of the 1862 state Constitution required the justice with the shortest remaining term to serve, and so Royal Sprague replaced Rhodes as chief justice. In October 1871, Rhodes was elected to a ten-year term. A new Constitution adopted in 1879 required elections for all Supreme Court positions. In 1879, he ran for Chief Justice but lost to Robert F. Morrison.

From 1899 to 1907, he served as a Superior Court judge in Santa Clara County. The vacancy on the trial bench caused by Rhodes's retirement (at the age of 88) was filled by John E. Richards.

Rhodes remained active to an advanced age; he gave an address at the annual convention of the California Bar Association in June 1918, four months before his death at the age of 97.

== Personal life ==
On September 30, 1846, Rhodes married Elizabeth Greene Cavins (April 7, 1829 – December 25, 1901), a judge's daughter in Greene County, Indiana. They had six children: Mary Rhodes (Barstow) (born 1848), who married the son of her father's law partner; James H. Rhodes (born 1849); Samuel R. Rhodes (born 1854), who became a doctor; Margaret Rhodes (1857–1870); Edward Livingston Rhodes (1860–1945), who joined his father's law firm of Rhodes & Barstow after graduating from the University of California, Berkeley, and later served as a justice of the peace in Chino, California; and Augusta E. Rhodes (born 1868).

== See also ==
- List of justices of the Supreme Court of California
- John Currey
- Silas Sanderson
- Lorenzo Sawyer
- Oscar L. Shafter

Legal offices
Preceded by Lorenzo Sawyer	Chief Justice of California; 1870–1872	Succeeded by Royal Sprague
Preceded by Elections under 1862 amendment to California constitution and 1863 enabling law	Associate Justice of the California Supreme Court; 1864–1870 and 1872-1880	Succeeded by Elections under new constitution of 1879
