= Elisha W. McKinstry =

American judge

Elisha Williams McKinstry
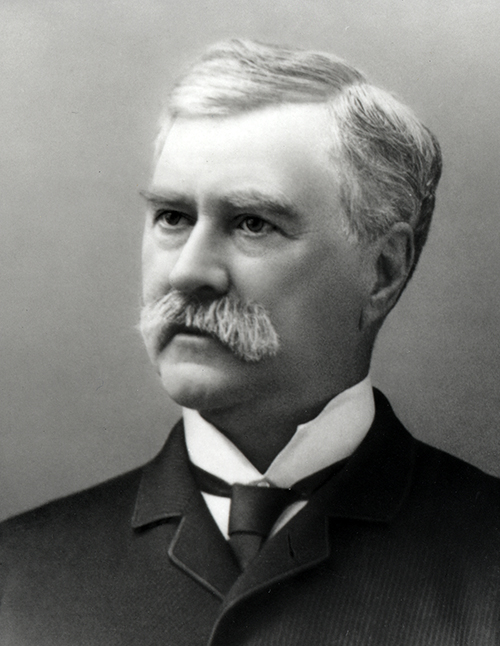

Associate Justice of the California Supreme Court
- In office January 5, 1874 – October 1, 1888
- Appointed by: Direct election
- Preceded by: Isaac S. Belcher
- Succeeded by: John D. Works

Member of the California State Assembly from the Sacramento district
- In office January 1, 1849 – December 31, 1850
- Preceded by: Constituency established

Personal details
- Born: April 10, 1824 Detroit, Michigan, U.S.
- Died: November 1, 1901 (aged 77) San Jose, California, U.S.
- Party: Democratic
- Spouse: Annie Hedges (m. 1863)
- Education: Kenyon College (B.A.)

Elisha Williams McKinstry (April 10, 1824 – November 1, 1901) was a California jurist of the nineteenth century. He served as a justice of the California Supreme Court from 1874 to 1888.

== Biography ==
McKinstry was born April 10, 1824, in Detroit, Michigan. He moved to Kinderhook, New York, read law and in 1847 was admitted to the New York bar.

In 1849, McKinstry came to California on the steamship Panama. and was a member of the first California State Assembly representing Sacramento. In 1851, he opened a law practice in Napa, and was elected in 1852 as judge of the Seventh Judicial District Court for a term of six years, and in 1858 was re-elected. In August 1860, he visited Paris, France, returning to California the following month. On November 13, 1862, he resigned from the district court. In January 1863, he moved to Mono County, California, and practiced law. In August 1863, during the American Civil War, he was nominated for Lieutenant Governor by the Copperhead Democratic Party, but lost the election. Afterwards, he moved Nevada, where he practiced law and ran unsuccessfully for a seat on the Nevada Supreme Court. In October 1864, he attended the Copperhead Democratic convention held in Carson, Nevada.

In October 1867, having returned to California, he was elected San Francisco county judge for a term of four years, but before his term expired he was elected as an independent candidate as a judge of the 12th District Court. In October 1867, during the election, a Catholic priest accused McKinstry of leading the Aurora Vigilance Committee, a quasi-lynch mob, in 1863 in Esmeralda County, Nevada, and refusing to accommodate the request for last rites by four men who were condemned to hang.

In September 1873, he was nominated by the People's Independent Party and elected on October 15, 1873, to the California Supreme Court, where he served from January 1874 to October 1, 1888. McKinstry filled the seat of former Chief Justice Royal Sprague, who died in office, and whose appointed successor, Isaac S. Belcher, did not run for election. In 1879, when adoption of a new constitution required elections for all seats on the Supreme Court, McKinstry was nominated by both the Democratic and Workingmen's Parties and was re-elected. The newly elected judges drew lots to determine the length of term, and McKinstry drew an 11-year term. His notable cases include Lux v. Haggin, holding riparian rights prevailed in California. He resigned from the court on October 1, 1888.

After stepping down from the bench, from 1888 to 1895 he was a professor of law at the University of California's Hastings College of the Law in San Francisco. He also engaged in private practice with his son, James C. McKinstry, and later with John A. Stanly and H. W. Bradley in the firm of Stanly, McKinstry, Bradley & McKinstry.

McKinstry died on November 1, 1901, in San Jose, California.

== Honors and awards ==
On December 20, 1899, McKinstry delivered the oration to the Jubilee Celebration at San Jose, California commemorating 50 years of statehood.

McKinstry was awarded an honorary LL.D. from the University of Michigan.

== Clubs ==
McKinstry was president of the Society of California Pioneers.

== Personal life ==
On July 27, 1863, McKinstry was married to Annie L. Hedges at Marysville, California, and they had two sons and two daughters: Capt. Charles H. McKinstry, Laura L. McKinstry, James C. McKinstry, and Frances McKinstry.

== See also ==
- List of justices of the Supreme Court of California

== Sources ==
- Jones, William Carey (1901). Illustrated History of the University of California, p. 321

Legal offices
Preceded by Isaac S. Belcher	Associate Justice of the California Supreme Court; 1874 – 1888	Succeeded by John D. Works
Preceded by Seat created by California Constitution of 1849	Assemblyman from Sacramento to the California State Assembly; 1849 – 1850	Succeeded by
