= Henry P. Haun =

American politician

Henry Peter Haun
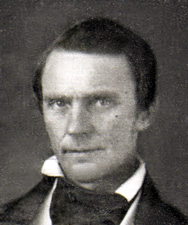

United States Senator from California
- In office November 3, 1859 – March 4, 1860
- Appointed by: John B. Weller
- Preceded by: David C. Broderick
- Succeeded by: Milton Latham

Personal details
- Born: January 18, 1815 Scott County, Kentucky, U.S.
- Died: June 6, 1860 (aged 45) Marysville, California, U.S.
- Resting place: Marysville Cemetery
- Party: Democratic
- Spouse: Catherine Haun (m. 1848)
- Children: 2
- Relatives: James Haun
- Occupation: Politician; judge; farmer

Henry Peter Haun (January 18, 1815 – June 6, 1860) was a California judge, farmer, and U.S. Senator from California. He was appointed by Governor John B. Weller to serve out the remaining four months of Senator David C. Broderick's term following his predecessor's death in a duel in 1859.

== Early life ==
Henry P. Haun was born on January 18, 1815, to John Haun and wife Katherine Winter Haun at Haun's Mill near Lexington, Kentucky. He graduated from Transylvania University and was admitted to the bar in 1839.

== Career ==
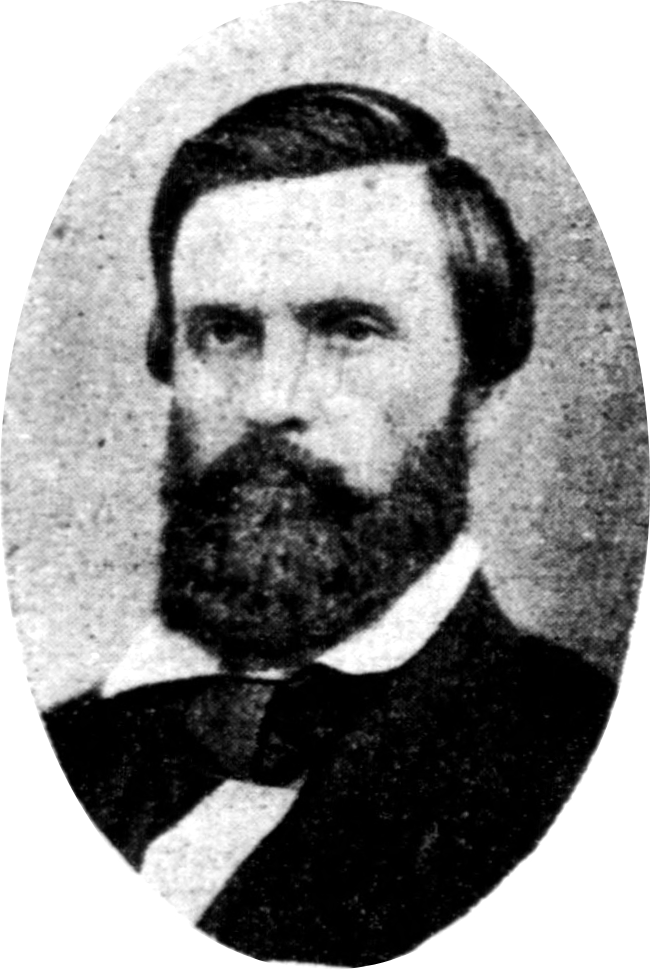
Haun later in his career

Haun was elected as the Prosecuting Attorney of Scott County, Kentucky. He then moved to Clinton County, Iowa to start a practice with his brother, W. G. Haun.

In 1846 he was elected as a delegate of the Iowa Constitutional Convention. In the spring of 1849, he traveled overland with his family during the California Gold Rush. They settled in Oroville, California in January 1850. He served as the first County Judge of Yuba County, California from 1851 to 1854.

== U.S. Senate ==
On October 29, 1859, he was selected by Governor John B. Weller to fill the vacancy of David C. Broderick in the U.S. Senate. He served as senator from November 3, 1859, to March 4, 1860. He was succeeded by Milton S. Latham.

== Personal life ==
On October 27, 1848, he married a cousin, Catherine Haun. They had two children, Kate (b. 1851) and David Rose (b. 1853).

== Death ==
Haun died on June 6, 1860, in Marysville, California at age 45, several days after returning from Washington, D.C.

U.S. Senate
Preceded by David C. Broderick	U.S. senator (Class 1) from California; 1859–1860; Served alongside: William M. Gwin	Succeeded by Milton S. Latham
