= Milton Latham =

American politician (1827–1882)

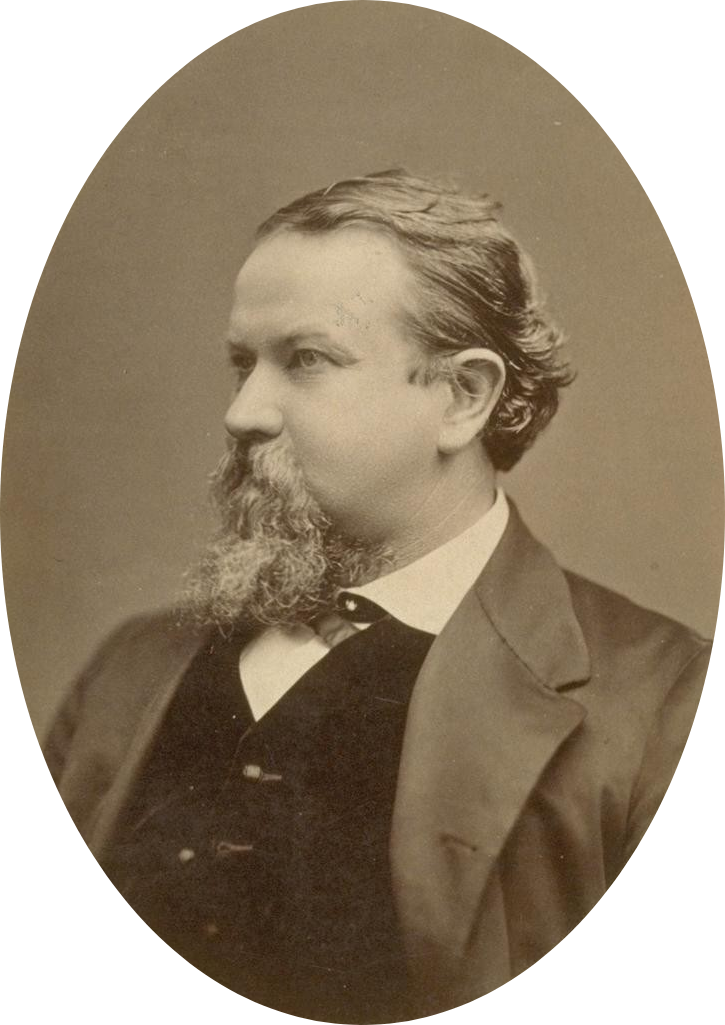
- Portrait by Bradley & Rulofson c. 1853–1863

United States Senator from California
- In office March 5, 1860 – March 3, 1863
- Preceded by: Henry P. Haun
- Succeeded by: John Conness

6th Governor of California
- In office January 9, 1860 – January 14, 1860
- Lieutenant: John G. Downey
- Preceded by: John B. Weller
- Succeeded by: John G. Downey

Member of the U.S. House of Representatives from California's at-large district
- In office March 4, 1853 – March 3, 1855
- Preceded by: Edward C. Marshall
- Succeeded by: James W. Denver

Personal details
- Born: May 23, 1827 Columbus, Ohio, US
- Died: March 4, 1882 (aged 54) New York City, US
- Resting place: Cypress Lawn Memorial Park
- Party: Lecompton Democrat
- Spouse: Sophie Birdsall
- Education: Jefferson College
- Profession: Lawyer, politician, teacher

Milton Slocum Latham (May 23, 1827 – March 4, 1882) was an American politician, who served as the sixth governor of California and as a U.S. representative and U.S. senator. Latham holds the distinction of having the shortest governorship in California history, lasting for five days between January 9 and January 14, 1860. A Lecompton Democrat, Latham resigned from office (the second governor to do so) after being elected by the state legislature to a seat in the U.S. Senate.

== Biography ==
Born in Columbus, Ohio in 1827, Latham was educated in classical studies at Jefferson College in Washington, Pennsylvania, graduating in 1845. Following his graduation, Latham moved to Russell County, Alabama, working briefly as a school teacher while studying law. He was admitted to the Alabama State Bar in 1848, working as Russell County's circuit court clerk for two years until 1850, when he relocated to San Francisco, California following the Gold Rush.

In San Francisco, Latham continued in law, becoming a recording clerk for the county, and in 1851, the district attorney of Sacramento. After serving for one year, Latham entered politics, and in 1852, ran as a Democrat and won a seat in the U.S. House of Representatives. After the completion of his two-year term, Latham declined to run for another term and returned to California to again practice law, despite being renominated by state Democrats.

Only a year after returning to San Francisco, Latham was appointed U.S. Customs Collector for the Port of San Francisco by President Franklin Pierce, a post the former congressman protested initially, but reluctantly later accepted. Latham held the post until 1857.

Since the beginning of the 1850s, issues regarding slavery had effectively split the national Democratic Party. California was controlled by the states-rights Chivalry wing, who had defeated Tammany Hall in the state. Nationally, by 1857, the party had split into the Lecompton and Anti-Lecompton factions. Lecompton members supported the Kansas Lecompton Constitution, a document explicitly allowing slavery into the territory, while Anti-Lecompton faction members were in opposition to slavery's expansion. The violence between supporting and opposition forces led to the period known as Bleeding Kansas. Splits in the Democratic Party, as well as the power vacuum created by the collapse of the Whig Party, helped facilitate the rise of the American Party both in state and federal politics. In particular, state voters voted Know-Nothings into the California State Legislature, and elected J. Neely Johnson as governor in the 1855 general elections.

During the 1859 general elections, Lecompton Democrats voted Latham, who had briefly lived in the American South, as their nominee for governor. Anti-Lecomptons in turn selected John Currey as their nominee. The infant Republican Party, running in its first gubernatorial election, selected businessman Leland Stanford as its nominee. To make matters more complicated, during the campaign, Senator David C. Broderick, an Anti-Lecompton Democrat, was killed in a duel by slavery supporter and former state Supreme Court Justice David Terry on September 13.

Despite the party split and Republican entrance to the campaign, Latham won the election, garnering sixty percent of the vote.

== Governor ==
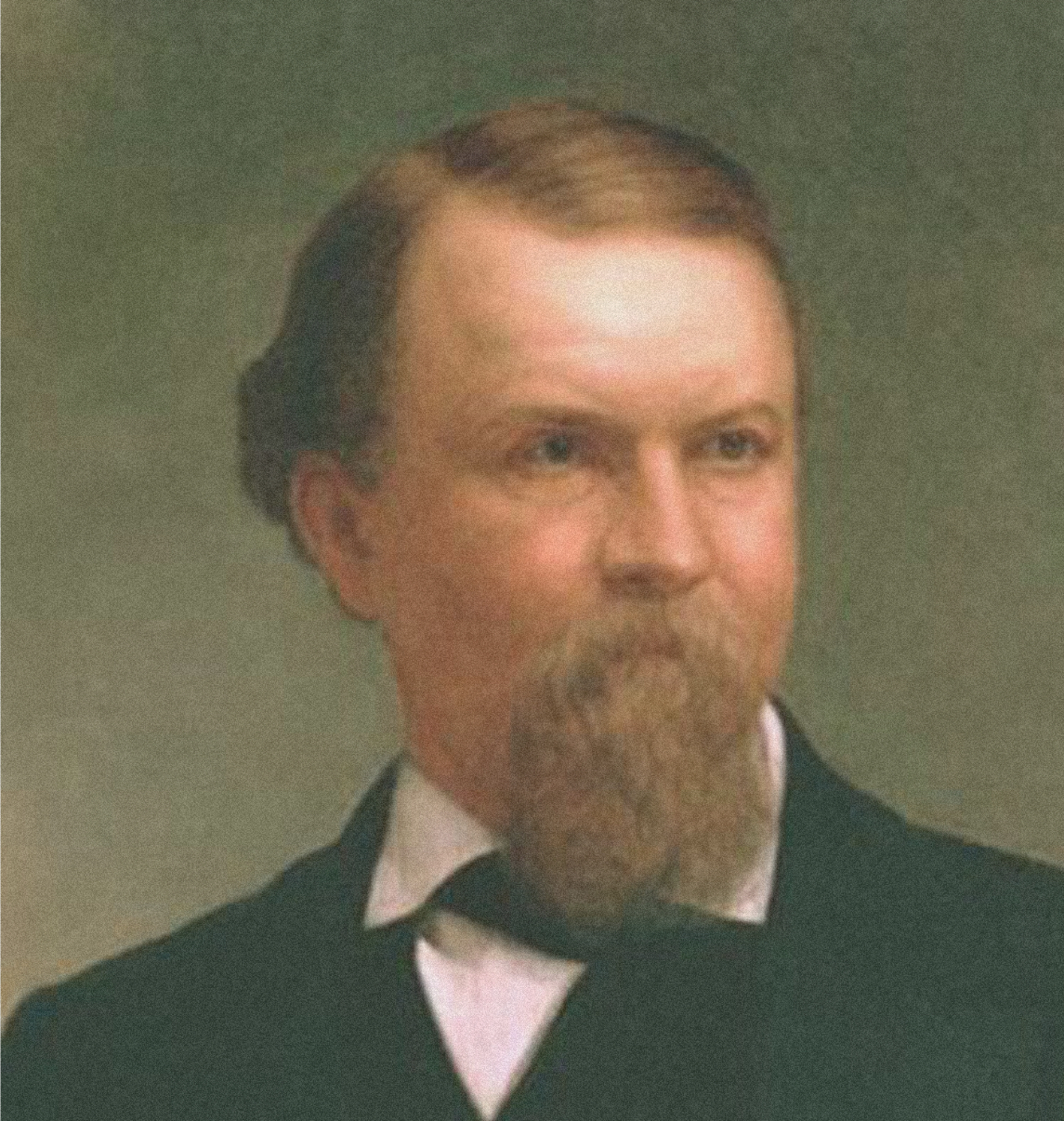
Milton Latham's official portrait in the California State Capitol

Latham was inaugurated on January 9, 1860. In his inauguration speech, the new governor outlined his main priority as solving the state's creeping debt, an issue that previously challenged former governors John Bigler, J. Neely Johnson and John Weller. Latham suggested curtailing legislative expenses, erecting more governmental buildings—such as completing the new State Capitol building—without raising taxes, and increasing U.S. Mail links from the Eastern United States to California to help facilitate commerce and personal links. Latham also suggested that the Office of the governor should not be made more powerful, and be securely checked by the legislature and courts.

However, only hours into his term, Latham's desire for political advancement was quickly known. Within days, Latham had proposed to the Assembly and Senate that he be elected to finish the term of the late U.S. Senator David C. Broderick, who had been killed in a duel the previous September. (Prior to the Seventeenth Amendment, state legislatures selected U.S. senators.) Henry P. Haun had been appointed to fill the vacancy on an interim basis and ran for the remainder of the term, but Latham was chosen by the legislature, and on January 14, 1860, just five days into his governorship, Latham resigned. He was the second California Governor to resign from office.

Latham's five-day tenure as governor remains the shortest in California history. His record for the shortest tenure of any California constitutional officer held until Republican Sean Wallentine served three days – December 31, 2010 to January 3, 2011 – as an acting member of the California State Board of Equalization.

== Post governorship ==
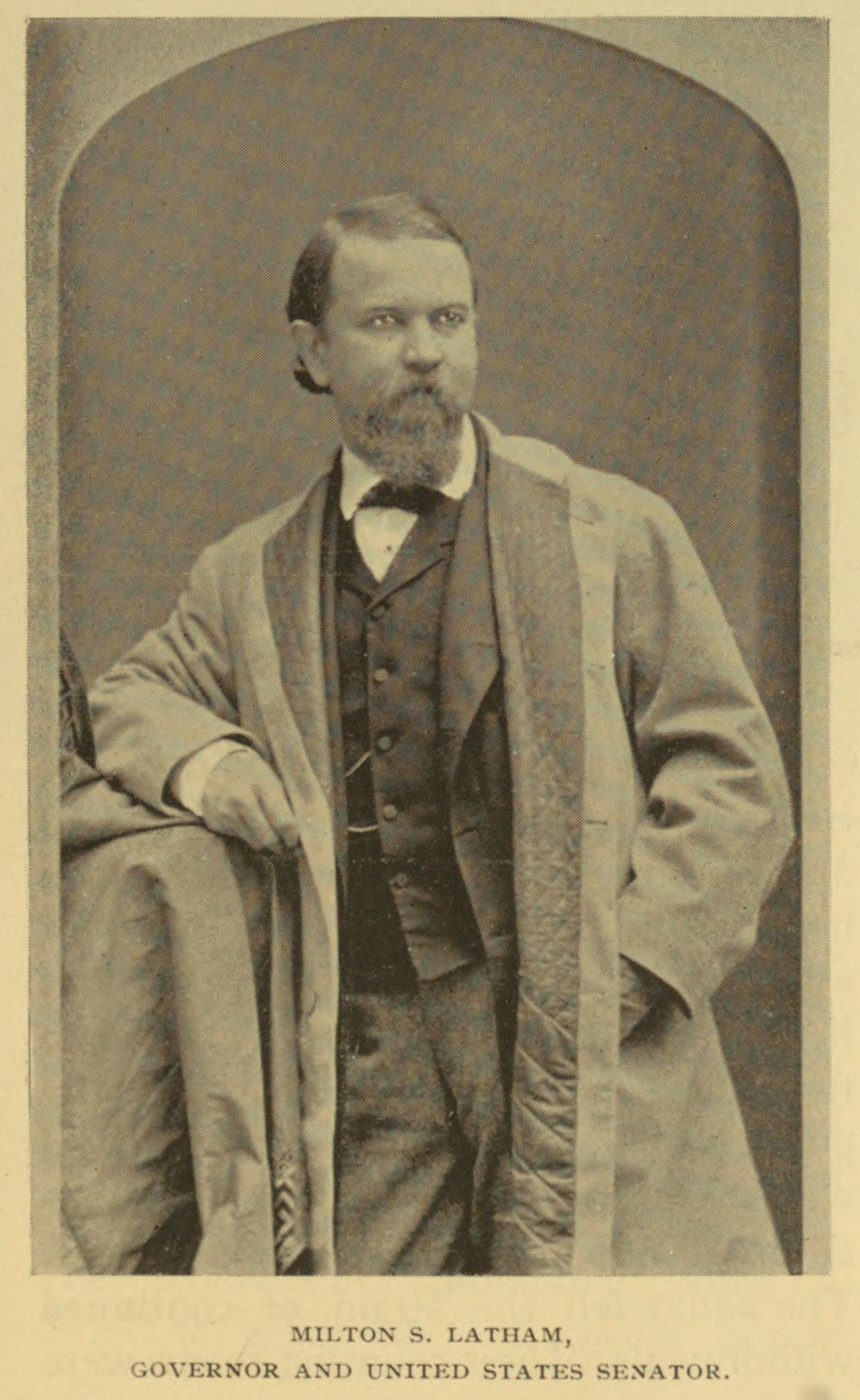
Latham c. 1860s

Latham traveled to Washington, D.C. to take his U.S. Senate seat later that year. Serving for the next three years as a Democrat, he ran for reelection once Broderick's original term expired in 1863. However, political support in California had turned away from the Democrats in favor of Unionist Republicans, who now controlled the State Legislature. Latham was succeeded by Unionist John Conness, a former Anti-Lecompton Democrat.

Following the end of his term, Latham traveled to Europe, joining the London and San Francisco Bank Ltd (now MUFG Union Bank), where he became the bank's San Francisco chief. Throughout the late 1860s and into the 1870s, Latham helped finance the California Pacific and the North Pacific Coast Railroad, earning recognition as one of California's rail barons.

In 1872, Latham bought and began renovating a 50-room Menlo Park mansion, Thurlow Lodge, as a gift to his second bride, Mary McMullin Latham, only for the estate to burn down before completion. Nevertheless, it was entirely rebuilt in 1873. In 1874, Latham commissioned Carleton Watkins to photograph the huge estate and produce two presentation albums of mammoth plate prints.

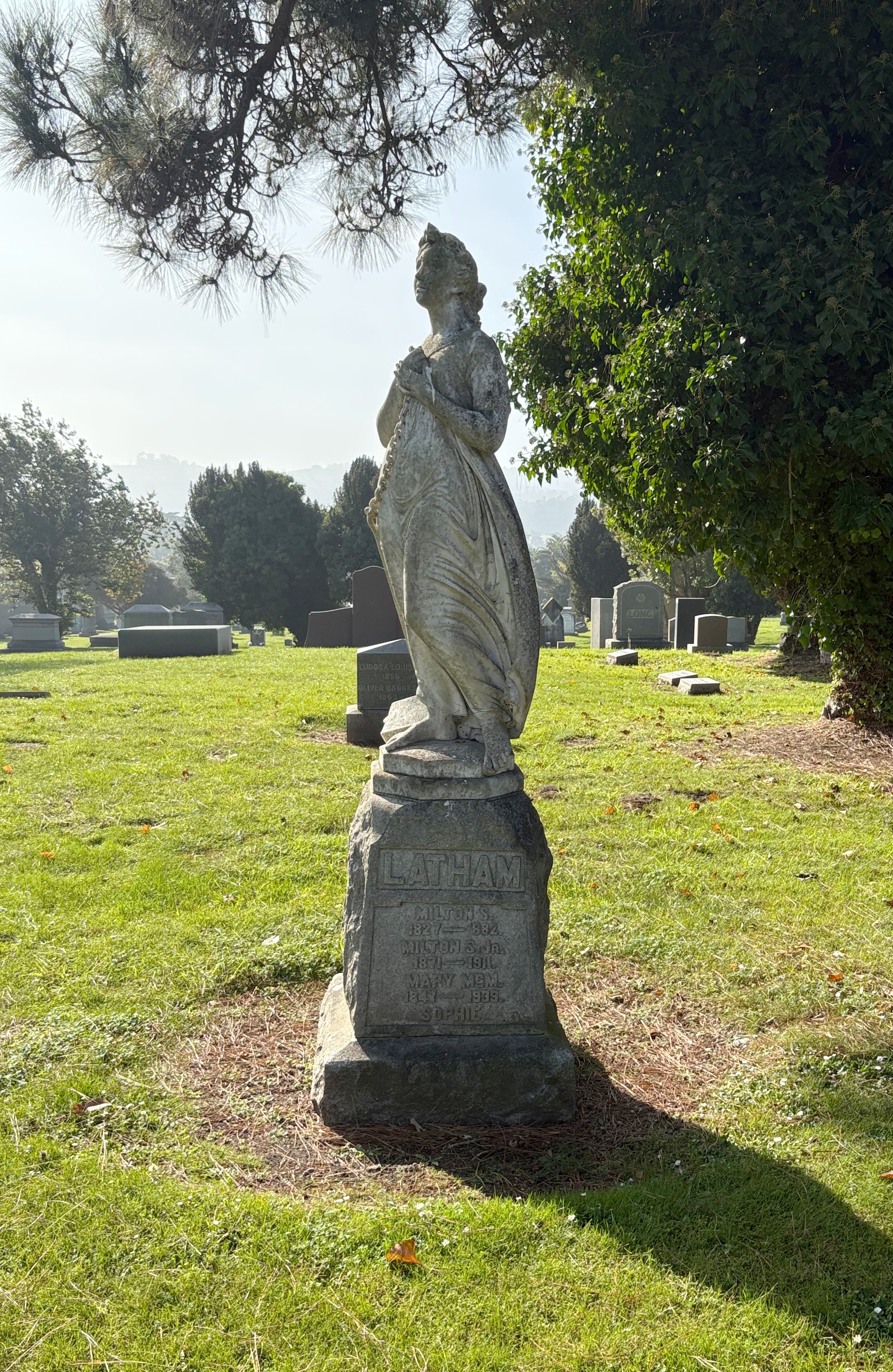
Latham's grave at Cypress Lawn Memorial Park

Latham moved to New York City in 1879 to become president of the New York Mining Stock Exchange. The former governor died in New York three years later in 1882 at 54. He was originally buried at Laurel Hill Cemetery in San Francisco (now the site of the Lone Mountain campus of the University of San Francisco), and re-interred at Cypress Lawn Memorial Park in nearby Colma in 1940.

Party political offices
First	Lecompton Democratic nominee for Governor of California; 1859	Succeeded by John R. McConnell
U.S. House of Representatives
Preceded by Edward C. Marshall	Member of the U.S. House of Representatives from California's at-large congressional district March 4, 1853 – March 3, 1855	Succeeded by James W. Denver
Political offices
Preceded by John B. Weller	Governor of California; January 9, 1860 – January 14, 1860	Succeeded by John G. Downey
U.S. Senate
Preceded by Henry P. Haun	U.S. senator (Class 1) from California; March 5, 1860 – March 3, 1863; Served alongside: William M. Gwin, James A. McDougall	Succeeded by John Conness
