= Lorenzo Sawyer =

American judge (1820–1891)

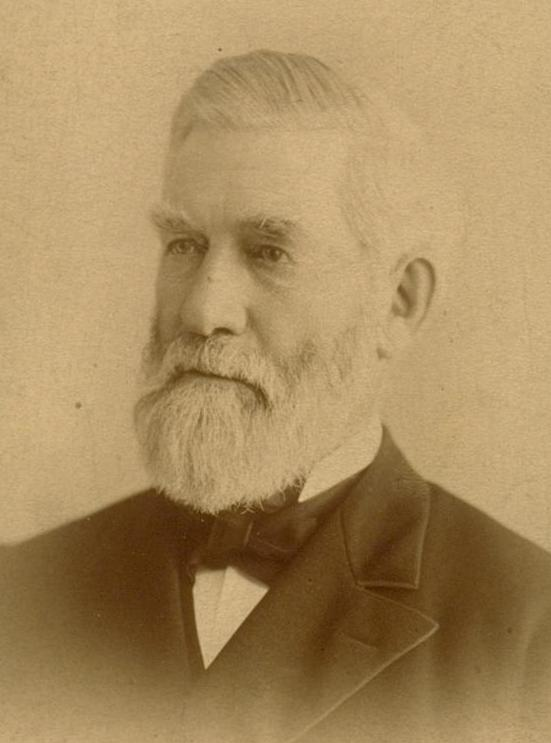

Judge of the United States Court of Appeals for the Ninth Circuit
- In office June 16, 1891 – September 7, 1891
- Appointed by: operation of law
- Preceded by: Seat established by 26 Stat. 826
- Succeeded by: Joseph McKenna

Judge of the United States Circuit Courts for the Ninth Circuit
- In office January 10, 1870 – September 7, 1891
- Appointed by: Ulysses S. Grant
- Preceded by: Seat established by 16 Stat. 44
- Succeeded by: Joseph McKenna

9th Chief Justice of the California Supreme Court
- In office 1868–1870
- Preceded by: John Currey
- Succeeded by: Augustus Rhodes

Personal details
- Born: Lorenzo Sawyer; May 23, 1820 Le Roy, New York, U.S.
- Died: September 7, 1891 (aged 71) San Francisco, California, U.S.
- Education: Case Western Reserve University; Ohio Central College read law

Lorenzo Sawyer (May 23, 1820 – September 7, 1891) was an American lawyer and judge who was appointed to the Supreme Court of California in 1860 and served as the ninth Chief Justice of California from 1868 to 1870. He served as a United States circuit judge of the United States Circuit Courts for the Ninth Circuit and of the United States Court of Appeals for the Ninth Circuit. He is best known for handing down the verdict in the case of Woodruff v. North Bloomfield Gravel Mining Company; his verdict is frequently referred to as the "Sawyer Decision."

== Early years ==
Sawyer was born on a farm in Le Roy, New York the eldest of six children. He worked on the farm during the summer and attended the district school in winter. At the age of fifteen he attended, for a short time, a high school at Watertown, New York, called the Black River Institute, where he became interested in the law. In 1837, having reached the age of seventeen, he went out on his own to pursue a course of study preparatory to commencing the study of law. The next eight years were devoted to preparation for the bar, at first in New York and afterward in Ohio. To support himself during this period, he taught in the district schools, and afterward in academies and as a tutor in college.

== Career ==
In 1840, Sawyer emigrated to Ohio, where he pursued his studies for a time at the Western Reserve College (now Case Western Reserve University), and afterward continued his studies at Columbus and at Ohio Central College near Columbus, graduating in 1846. He was admitted to the bar of the Supreme Court of Ohio in May 1846. He afterward went to Chicago, Illinois, where he passed a year in the office of future California Senator James A. McDougall. Soon afterward he entered into a law partnership with the Lieutenant-Governor John Edwin Holmes at Jefferson, Wisconsin, where he was rapidly acquiring an extensive and lucrative practice, when the California Gold Rush happened.

Joining a company of men from Wisconsin, he made his way across the country in seventy-two days, arriving in California (until statehood on September 9, 1850, California was a part of the Mexican Cession) about the middle of July 1850 in "an unprecedentedly short trip." He wrote sketches of this trip, which were published in the Ohio Observer, and copied into many of the western papers. They were highly appreciated and were used as a guide by many emigrants of the succeeding year. After working in the mines for a short time, he went to Sacramento and opened a law office there. Ill health, however, compelled him to seek the climate of the mountains, and accordingly he moved to Nevada City and entered upon the practice of law in October of that year, his law library consisting of eleven volumes which he had brought across the plains. With the exception of a few months from February to August 1851 passed in San Francisco, during which time his office was twice burned, he remained in Nevada City until the autumn of 1853, when he returned to San Francisco. In 1853 he was elected City Attorney as a nominee of the Whig Party. In September 1854, he was again nominated for City Attorney by the Whig and American Party, or Know Nothings.

In 1855, Sawyer was a candidate for Justice of the Supreme Court, and came within six votes of reaching the nomination. On March 6, 1861, he was admitted to the bar of the Supreme Court of the United States. In the spring of 1861, he formed a law partnership with the General C. H. S. Williams, and in the winter of 1861-1862 they determined to open a branch office in Virginia City, Nevada. Sawyer went to Virginia City in January 1862 to open the office and establish the business, and while there Governor Leland Stanford of California offered him the appointment of City and County Attorney of San Francisco, which he declined. In June 1862, he was offered a vacant spot in the office of Judge of the Twelfth Judicial District, embracing the city and county of San Mateo, which he accepted, and he was unanimously reelected to office when his first term was up, both political parties giving him their support.

Upon the reorganization of the State courts, under the amended constitution, Judge Sawyer was in 1863 elected a justice of the Supreme Court of California, and drew a six-year term, during the last two years of which he was chief justice. During his term, he was noted for the thoroughness and elaborateness of his decisions and held in high regard.

In November 1885, Sawyer served as an original trustee of Leland Stanford Junior University (now Stanford University).

Sawyer died on September 7, 1891, in San Francisco and he was buried at Laurel Hill Cemetery (which no longer exists).

== Federal judicial service ==
Sawyer was nominated by President Ulysses S. Grant on December 8, 1869, to the United States Circuit Courts for the Ninth Circuit, to a new seat authorized by 16 Stat. 44. He was confirmed by the United States Senate on January 10, 1870, and received his commission the same day. Sawyer was assigned by operation of law to additional and concurrent service on the United States Court of Appeals for the Ninth Circuit on June 16, 1891, to a new seat authorized by 26 Stat. 826 (Evarts Act). His service terminated on September 7, 1891, due to his death.

=== Sawyer decision ===
In 1884, Sawyer handed down what became known as the "Sawyer Decision" in Woodruff v. North Bloomfield Mining and Gravel Company which abruptly ended hydraulic mining in Northern California's Gold Country.

== See also ==
- The case of In re Ah Yup
- List of justices of the Supreme Court of California

== Sources ==
- Phelps, Alonzo (1881). Contemporary Biography of California's Representative Men: With Contributions from Distinguished Scholars and Scientists. A. L. Bancroft. pp. 127–131.

Legal offices
Preceded by John Currey	Chief Justice of the California Supreme Court; 1868–1870	Succeeded by Augustus Rhodes
Preceded by Seat established by 16 Stat. 44	Judge of the United States Circuit Courts for the Ninth Circuit; 1870–1891	Succeeded by Joseph McKenna
Preceded by Seat established by 26 Stat. 826	Judge of the United States Court of Appeals for the Ninth Circuit; 1891	Succeeded by Joseph McKenna
