= Sloss =

Sloss can refer to:

== People ==
- Bruce Sloss (1889–1917), Australian Rules footballer, killed in action in World War I
- Daniel Sloss (born 1990), Scottish comedian, actor and writer
- Elizabeth Butler-Sloss (born 1933), President of the Family Division of the UK's family law system
- James Sloss (1820–1890), founder of Sloss Furnaces
- John Sloss (born 1956), American film producer
- John Sloss, birth name of John Sterling (sportscaster) (1938–2026), American sportscaster
- Louis Sloss (1823–1902), partner in the Alaska Commercial Company
- M. C. Sloss (1869–1958), American judge in California
- Peter Sloss, Scottish meteorologist and broadcaster for BBC Scotland

== Other ==
- Sloss Furnaces, a National Historic Landmark in Birmingham, Alabama
- The SLOSS debate regarding biodiversity in conservation planning
