= Warren Olney (disambiguation) =

Warren Olney (1841–1921) was an American lawyer who served as 34th mayor of Oakland, California.

Warren Olney may also refer to:

- Warren Olney Jr. (1870–1939), justice of the Supreme Court of California
- Warren Olney III (1904–1978), United States Assistant Attorney General, Criminal Division, from 1953 to 1957
- Warren Olney IV, American broadcast journalist
