= Leondra Kruger =

American judge (born 1976)

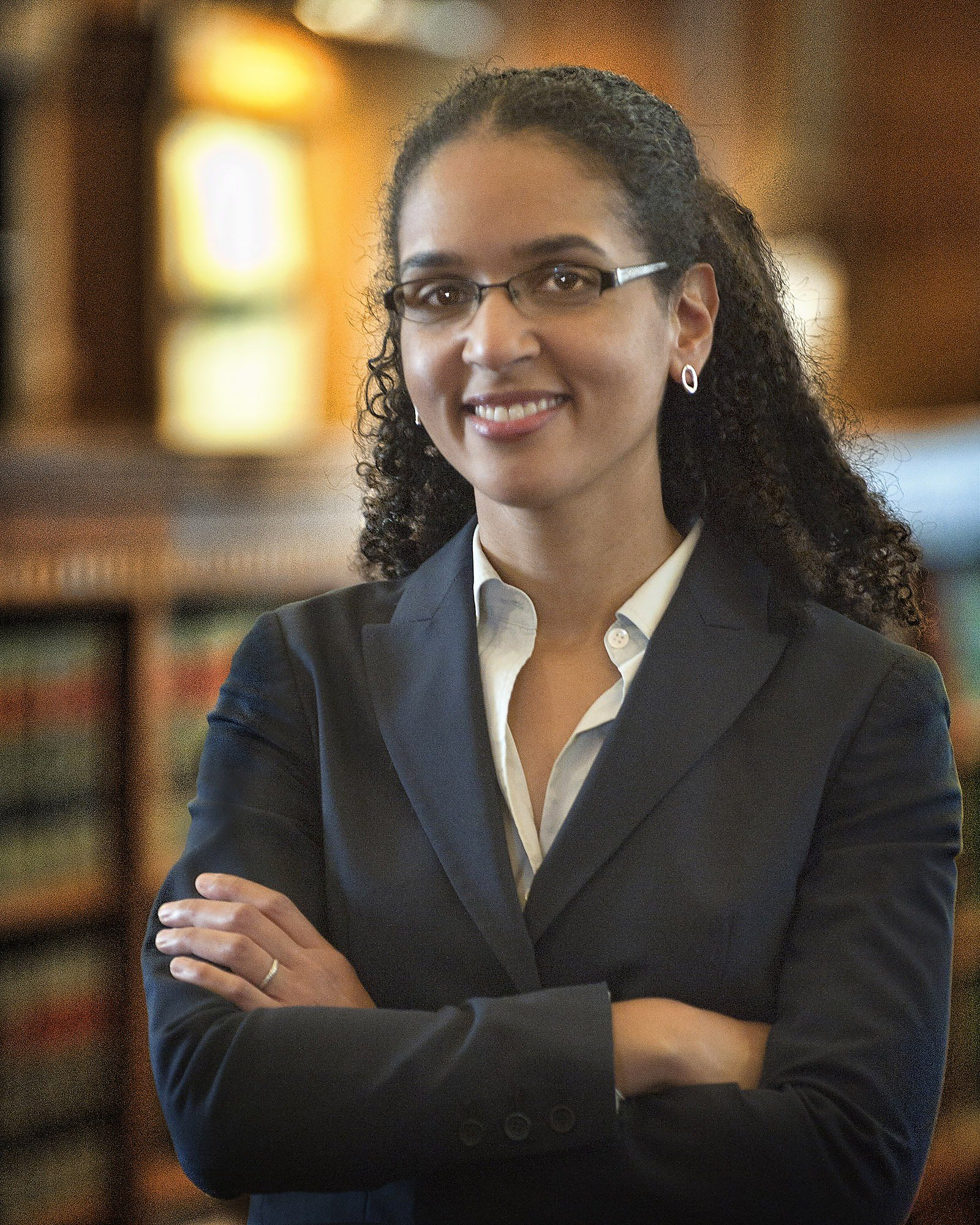

Associate Justice of the Supreme Court of California
- Incumbent
- Assumed office January 5, 2015
- Appointed by: Jerry Brown
- Preceded by: Joyce L. Kennard

Acting Principal Deputy Solicitor General of the United States
- In office May 17, 2010 – June 9, 2011
- President: Barack Obama
- Preceded by: Neal Katyal
- Succeeded by: Neal Katyal

Personal details
- Born: Leondra Reid Kruger; July 28, 1976 (age 49) Glendale, California, U.S.
- Party: Democratic
- Spouse: Brian Hauck
- Children: 2
- Education: Harvard University (BA); Yale University (JD)

Leondra Reid Kruger (born July 28, 1976) is an American judge who serves as an associate justice of the Supreme Court of California.

A native of South Pasadena, California, she graduated from Harvard College and Yale Law School. Kruger then clerked for U.S. Supreme Court Justice John Paul Stevens, and subsequently worked in private practice and as a professor. She served as acting Principal Deputy Solicitor General of the United States from 2010 to 2011, and worked in the Office of Legal Counsel. In 2014, California Governor Jerry Brown nominated Kruger to a seat on the Supreme Court of California. She was confirmed, and was sworn in on January 5, 2015.

Kruger was considered a potential nominee for the Supreme Court of the United States, following the announcement of Justice Stephen Breyer's intention to retire in 2022.

== Early life and education ==
Born in Glendale, California on July 28, 1976, Kruger grew up in South Pasadena. Her mother, Audrey Reid, immigrated to the United States from Jamaica, and her late father, Leon Kruger, was an American Jew whose parents had immigrated to the U.S. from Europe. Kruger's parents were both pediatricians. She attended Polytechnic School in Pasadena, California, and was a National Merit Scholar. She was a high school classmate of James Ho, who would later become a judge of the U.S. Fifth Circuit Court of Appeals. She then earned a Bachelor of Arts degree magna cum laude from Harvard University, where she wrote for The Harvard Crimson and was a member of Phi Beta Kappa. She then attended Yale Law School, graduating in 2001 with a Juris Doctor. Kruger was editor-in-chief of the Yale Law Journal, the first Black woman ever to hold the position.

== Legal career ==
After law school, Kruger spent a year as an associate at the law firm Jenner & Block. She then clerked for Judge David Tatel on the U.S. Court of Appeals for the District of Columbia Circuit from 2002 to 2003 and for Justice John Paul Stevens of the U.S. Supreme Court from 2003 to 2004. She then returned to private practice for two years at Wilmer, Cutler, Pickering, Hale and Dorr in Washington, D.C. She was a visiting assistant professor in 2007 at the University of Chicago Law School.

From 2007 to 2013, Kruger was an assistant to the United States Solicitor General, and the acting principal deputy solicitor general. She argued 12 cases before the U.S. Supreme Court, and worked on a case defending the Affordable Care Act, National Federation of Independent Businesses v. Sebelius.

In 2013, Kruger became a deputy assistant attorney general at the United States Department of Justice's Office of Legal Counsel.

== Judicial career ==
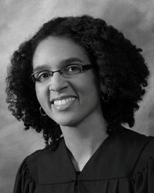
Kruger in 2015, shortly after her confirmation to the California Supreme Court

On November 24, 2014, then Governor Jerry Brown announced the appointment of Kruger to the California Supreme Court. On her questionnaire for the high court position, Kruger acknowledged she had never before taken a deposition and that, "I have not tried any cases to verdict or judgment." Although she had no prior judicial experience, her selection was publicly praised by then-U.S. Attorney General Eric Holder, Obama's then-U.S. Solicitor General Donald B. Verrilli Jr., Obama's former Acting Solicitor General Neal Katyal, and former Solicitor General (under President George W. Bush) Paul Clement.

Kruger was confirmed on December 29, 2014, and replaced Associate Justice Joyce L. Kennard, who retired. She was sworn in on January 5, 2015, and became the court's second African-American woman justice, following Janice Rogers Brown. At 38, she was the youngest appointee (Note: Other, younger members of the court in the past were elected: David S. Terry, at 32; Erskine Mayo Ross, at 34; Terry W. Ward, at 37; and Van R. Paterson, at 38.) to the court in recent years and the third youngest appointee to the court ever, after Hugh C. Murray and M. C. Sloss. In November 2015, Kruger delivered the annual Bernard E. Witkin lecture before the Los Angeles County Bar Association.

On the court, Kruger has emerged as an incrementalist, stating that she views her role as, at least in part, "enhanc[ing] the predictability and stability of the law" to improve "public confidence and trust in the work of the courts." She is sometimes considered one of the swing votes when the court is occasionally divided, and is seen as a moderate liberal on the progressive-leaning seven-member court.

In 2018, Kruger was retained by California voters to serve a full twelve-year term on the court, securing 72.8% of the vote.

=== Notable court opinions ===
National Lawyers Guild v. City of Hayward (2020) 9 Cal.5th 488, an opinion interpreting the California Public Records Act as not allowing a local agency to charge the costs of redacting statutorily exempt material from otherwise disclosable electronic records, and thereby clearing the way for members of the public to secure body camera footage from police officers. The Electronic Frontier Foundation praised the decision as "an unqualified victory for government transparency."

People v. Lopez (2019) 8 Cal.5th 353, which rejected warrantless vehicle searches for personal identification documents during traffic stops.

People v. Buza (2018) 4 Cal.5th 658, authored the majority opinion in a 4-3 decision applying United States Supreme Court precedent and declining to address a broader constitutional challenge to the 2004 California Proposition 69, which requires police to collect DNA samples from all persons who are arrested for felony offenses. The law has led to the storing of DNA profiles of tens of thousands of individuals arrested but never charged or convicted of a crime.

California Cannabis Coalition v. City of Upland (2017) 3 Cal.5th 924, authored the concurring and dissenting opinion in a 5-2 decision in which Kruger would have applied the state constitutional voter approval requirements, including the supermajority vote requirements, of 1996 California Proposition 218 ("Right to Vote on Taxes Act" and the progeny of 1978 California Proposition 13) to local tax increases enacted via the initiative power.

Barry v. State Bar of California (2017) 2 Cal.5th 318, concerning subject matter jurisdiction and California's anti-SLAPP statute.

=== U.S. Supreme Court consideration ===
After President Joe Biden made a campaign pledge to appoint the first African American woman to the United States Supreme Court, Kruger became the subject of speculation as a potential future nominee (Ketanji Brown Jackson was ultimately nominated to the seat). If she had been nominated to replace Justice Stephen Breyer, she would have continued the tradition of the court's "Jewish seat." While Justice Elena Kagan is also Jewish, Breyer sits in a seat historically assigned to a Jew for a large part of the past 100 years. The seat was held by Benjamin Cardozo, Felix Frankfurter, Arthur Goldberg, Abe Fortas, and Breyer, but also was occupied from 1970 to 1994 by the Methodist Harry Blackmun.

In February 2022, Kruger faced questions from the Biden administration regarding her interpretation of religious liberty, particularly in relation to her role in arguing the case Hosanna-Tabor Evangelical Lutheran Church & School v. Equal Employment Opportunity Commission at the Supreme Court in 2012.

Biden had also reportedly offered Kruger the position of solicitor general, which she turned down more than once.

== Personal life ==
Kruger is married to Brian Hauck, a partner at Jenner & Block in San Francisco. Her young son attended her swearing-in ceremony to the California Supreme Court. About a year later, she gave birth to her second child, a girl, becoming the first member of the court to give birth while serving on it. She has two half-siblings.

== See also ==
- Joe Biden Supreme Court candidates
- List of African-American jurists
- List of Jewish American jurists
- List of justices of the Supreme Court of California
- List of law clerks for the fourth seat of the Supreme Court of the United States
- Vaino Spencer

Legal offices
Preceded by Joyce L. Kennard	Associate Justice of the Supreme Court of California; 2015–present	Incumbent
