= Charles A. Shurtleff =

American judge (1857–1941)

Charles Allerton Shurtleff
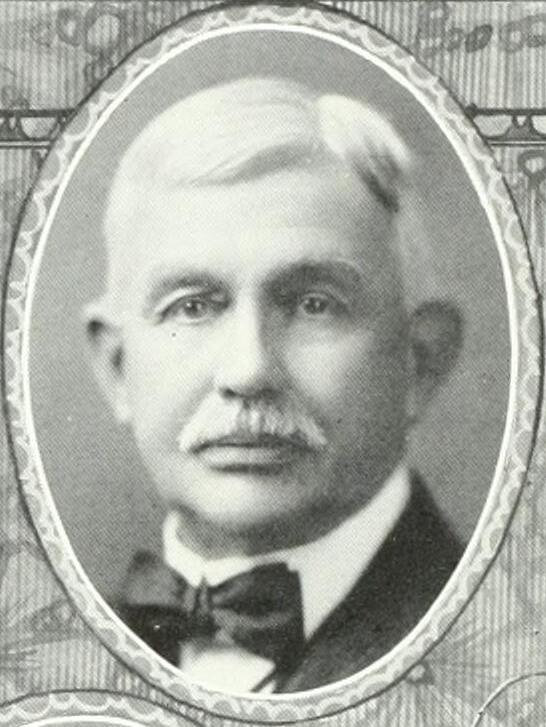
- Shurtleff c. 1923

Associate Justice of the California Supreme Court
- In office July 2, 1921 – December 18, 1922
- Appointed by: Governor William Stephens
- Preceded by: Warren Olney Jr.
- Succeeded by: Terry W. Ward

Personal details
- Born: April 4, 1857 Shasta County, California, U.S.
- Died: April 14, 1941 (aged 84) Menlo Park, California, U.S.
- Spouse: Ada G. West (m. 1886; died 1925) Nellie V. Crockett (m. 1927; died 1934)
- Parent: Benjamin Shurtleff (father)
- Education: Napa College (B.A.); Hastings College of the Law (LL.B.)

Charles Allerton Shurtleff (April 4, 1857 – April 14, 1941) was an associate justice of the Supreme Court of California from July 2, 1921, to December 1922.

== Biography ==
Born in Shasta County, California, Shurtleff was the second of three sons of pioneer physician Benjamin Shurtleff. He was educated in the public schools of Shasta County, and received an A.B. from Napa College, later affiliated with the College of the Pacific, in 1879, and an LL.B. from the Hastings College of the Law in 1882.

Shurtleff commenced the practice of the law in San Francisco, first with Morris M. Estee, a distinguished lawyer who later was appointed United States District Judge for the Territory of Hawaii, and then in 1883 or 1884 with Judge Waldo M. York, the father of Judge John M. York, and with distinguished attorney John M. Whitworth. Shurtleff was active in Republican Party politics, serving in June 1890 on the party's 41st Assembly district club. In November 1890, Shurtleff was appointed as Assistant United States Attorney for the Northern District of California. After resigning in October 1893 from the U.S. Attorney's Office, Shurtleff returned to private practice. Of his former law partners, Waldo moved to New York, and Whitworth died, leaving Shurtleff to continue his practice with Robert B. Gaylord until 1909, and then with Joseph G. DeForest.

On July 1, 1921, Shurtleff was appointed by Governor William Stephens to a seat of the Supreme Court of California vacated by the resignation of Associate Justice Warren Olney Jr. When first offered appointment to the state supreme court, Shurtleff, who was noted for his loyalty to his employees, initially declined because it would cause him to abandon his secretary, who had served him faithfully for many years. The Chief Justice prevailed on Shurtleff by permitting him to bring his secretary to work at the court. In November 1922, he ran for the remainder of Olney's unexpired term, but lost the election.

== Bar and civic activities ==
Over the course of his career, Shurtleff was active in several bar and civic boards. In the bar, he was a member along with M. C. Sloss of the first Board of Bar Examiners, a president of both the Legal Aid Society and the Bar Association of San Francisco, and an organizer of the self-governing bar of California. In addition, he was a trustee of several organizations, including the Hastings College of the Law, San Francisco's Children's Hospital, and the College of the Pacific. Finally, he was a member at large of the National Board of Stanford University. He was a member of the Society of California Pioneers.

== Personal life ==
Shurtleff was married to Ada G. West from October 14, 1886, until her death on November 29, 1925, and then to Nellie Valentine Crockett from July 25, 1927, to her death September 14, 1934. They had no children of their own.

== See also ==
- List of justices of the Supreme Court of California

Legal offices
Preceded by Warren Olney Jr.	Associate Justice of the California Supreme Court; 1921–1922	Succeeded by Terry W. Ward
