= Pauline Kim =

Pauline Kim, a specialist in employment law, is the Charles Nagel Chair of Constitutional Law and Political Science at Washington University in St. Louis and the Co-Director of its Center for Empirical Research in the Law.

== Biography ==
Kim earned an A.B., summa cum laude, in social justice from Harvard and Radcliffe Colleges in 1984. From 1984 to 1985, Kim attended New College, Oxford University, as a Henry Fellow (Studies in jurisprudence, political and moral philosophy). In 1988, Kim graduated with J.D., magna cum laude, from Harvard Law School.

Kim served as a Clerk for Cecil F. Poole on the United States Court of Appeals for the Ninth Circuit (1988-1989). Then, she became a Staff Attorney at the Employment Law Center of The Legal Aid Society of San Francisco (1990-1994). In 1994, she joined the faculty of Washington University School of Law as Associate Professor. She was the first recipient of the law school's John S. Lehmann Research Professorship in 2007-2008 and was the school's Associate Dean for Research and Faculty Development in 2008-2010, and co-founded its Workshop on Empirical Research in the Law.

== Awards and honors ==
- David M. Becker Professor of the Year, 2016
- International Association of Privacy Professionals Paper Award for "Data-Driven Discrimination at Work," presented at Privacy Law Scholars' Conference, 2016

== Selected publications ==
- Work Law: Cases and Materials (3d ed.), with Marion Crain & Michael Selmi, Matthew Bender & Co./LexisNexis Group (2015). ISBN 978-1632815392
