= Emmett Seawell =

American judge (1862–1939)

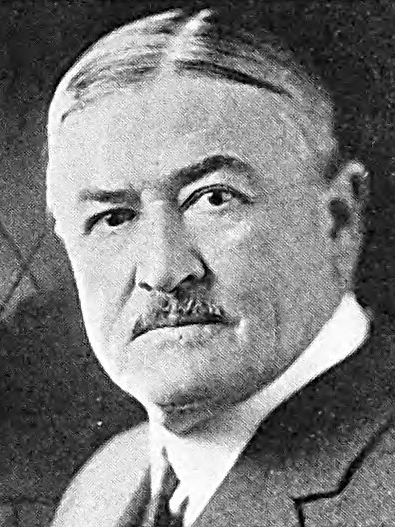

Associate Justice of the California Supreme Court
- In office January 8, 1923 – July 7, 1939
- Appointed by: Elected
- Preceded by: Terry W. Ward
- Succeeded by: Jesse W. Carter

Personal details
- Born: April 5, 1862 Yountville, California, U.S.
- Died: July 7, 1939 (aged 77) San Francisco, California, U.S.
- Spouse: Ida S Graiter (m. 1892)
- Education: Pacific Methodist University

Emmett Seawell (April 5, 1862 – July 7, 1939) was an associate justice of the Supreme Court of California from January 8, 1923, to July 7, 1939.

== Biography ==
Born in Yountville, California, Seawell was one of 11 children of California pioneers, William Neely Seawell and Sarah A. Rickman. His father later served as Deputy Sheriff and then justice of the peace in Santa Rosa. Emmett was educated in the public schools, and for three years after high school worked in the printing trade and for newspapers. In 1887, he graduated from the Pacific Methodist College of Santa Rosa, read law in the office of J.W. Oates, and was admitted to the California bar in 1890.

Next, Seawell entered private practice with W. F. Cowan in Santa Rosa and held a series of public posts. In 1892, he was elected District Attorney for Sonoma County, California. In October 1898, he was nominated by the Democratic Party in the First District and ran unsuccessfully for United States Congress. In 1902, he was elected to the position of Judge of the Superior Court for Sonoma County, a position he held until 1922. In June 1911, he lent his courtroom to the Santa Rosa Equal Suffrage Association to hold its meeting for the right of women to vote. In 1914 he was appointed pro-tem Judge of the Superior Court for Stanislaus County, a position he held until 1919.

In November 1922, Seawell was elected as a member of the Supreme Court of California, defeating Charles A. Shurtleff, whose term ended December 18, 1922. Until Seawell was sworn in, Terry W. Ward filled the gap period as justice. Seawell sat on the high court for nearly 17 years until his heart attack in the courtroom of the Supreme Court and death on July 7, 1939. In August 1939, Governor Culbert L. Olson appointed Jesse W. Carter to fill Seawell's seat.

== Personal life ==
On March 20, 1892, Seawell married Ida S. Graiter in Santa Rosa.

== See also ==
- List of justices of the Supreme Court of California

Legal offices
Preceded by Terry W. Ward	Associate Justice of the California Supreme Court; 1923–1939	Succeeded by Jesse W. Carter
