= Benjamin Shurtleff =

American performance artist and political activist

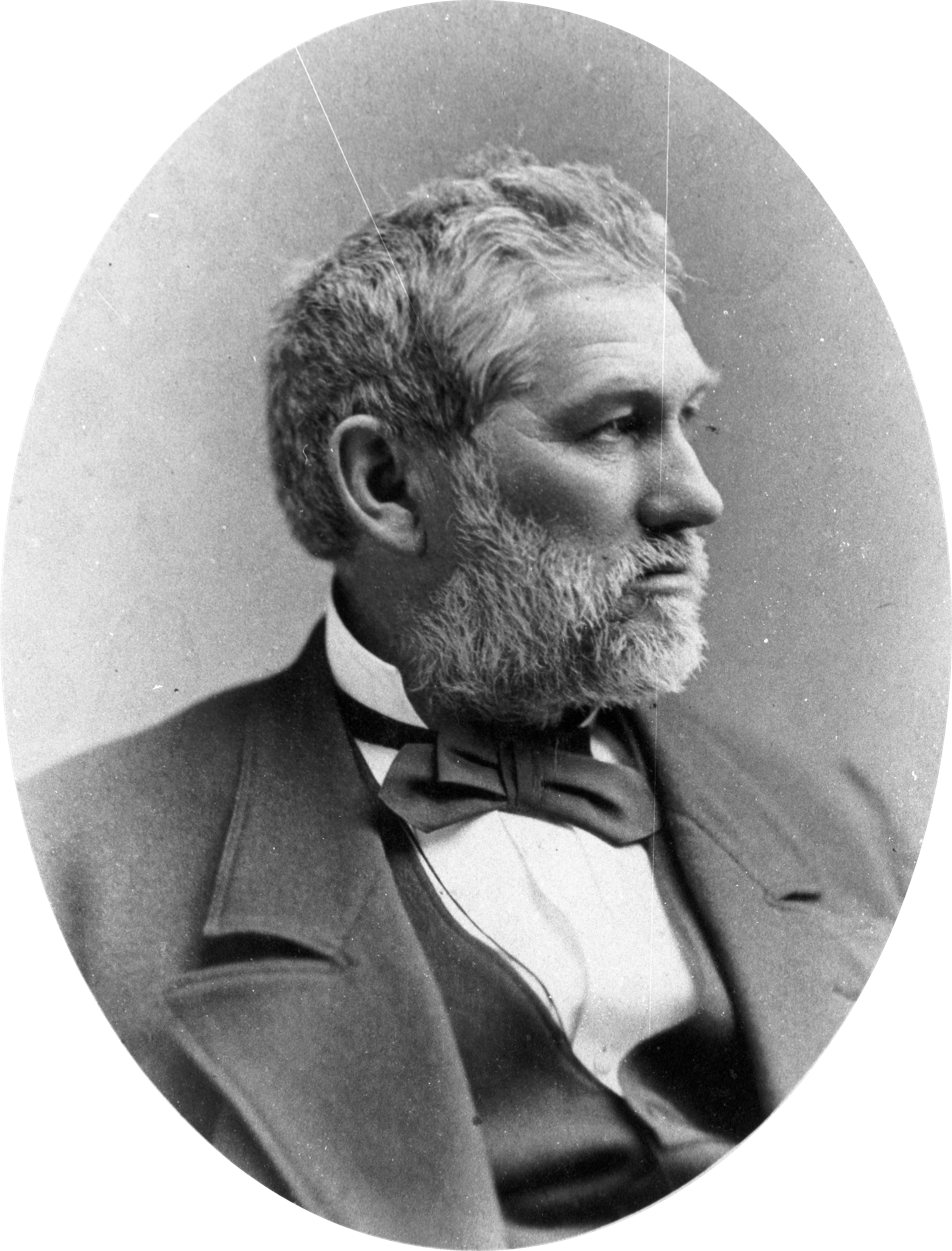
- Shurtleff c. 1875

Delegate to the Second Constitutional Convention of California
- In office September 28, 1878 – March 3, 1879
- Preceded by: Office established
- Succeeded by: Office abolished
- Constituency: 3rd congressional district

Member of the California Senate from the 26th district
- In office January 7, 1861 – December 6, 1863
- Preceded by: Seat established
- Succeeded by: John P. Jones

Personal details
- Born: September 7, 1821 Carver, Massachusetts, U.S.
- Died: December 21, 1911 (aged 90) Napa, California, U.S.
- Party: Whig (before 1856); Democratic (1856–1864); Republican (after 1864)
- Spouse: Ann M. Griffith (m. 1853; div. 1905)
- Children: 3, including Charles
- Education: Pierce Academy; Fremont Medical School of Boston; Harvard University
- Occupation: Physician, hospital director

Benjamin Shurtleff (September 7, 1821 – December 21, 1911) was an American politician and physician from California. He was member of the California State Senate and was the director of the Napa State Hospital.

== Early life ==
He was born September 7, 1821, in Carver, Massachusetts to Hannah Shaw and Charles Shurtleff. He was educated in the public schools until the age of fifteen, and then attended Pierce Academy, where he began teaching at age nineteen.

He studied medicine with his brother, Dr. G. A. Shurtleff, and with Dr. Elisha Huntington of Lowell, Massachusetts. He attended the Fremont Medical School of Boston and was taught by Dr. Oliver Wendell Holmes Sr. Shurtleff graduated from the medical school of Harvard University in 1848.

== Career ==
In 1849, he traveled to California and settled in Shasta County, where he began practicing medicine. He also owned a drug store and engaged in mining. He was elected as the first treasurer of Shasta County and, later, became a California State Senator representing Shasta County and Trinity County from 1861 to 1863. In 1863, he was the Democratic candidate for U.S. Senator, but lost to Unionist John Conness. He was a Republican.

In 1874, he moved to Napa, California, where he served as director of the Napa State Hospital for nineteen years. He was also mayor of Napa for many years. He was a member of the California constitutional convention of 1879.

== Personal life ==
While on a trip to New England, he married Anna M. B. Griffith, who was born in Middleboro, Massachusetts, on February 21, 1853 They had three sons, Benjamin E. Shurtleff, Charles A. Shurleff, and George C. Shurleff.

He was a Mason. He died December 21, 1911, in Napa, California at the age of ninety.
