= Warren Olney III =

American lawyer

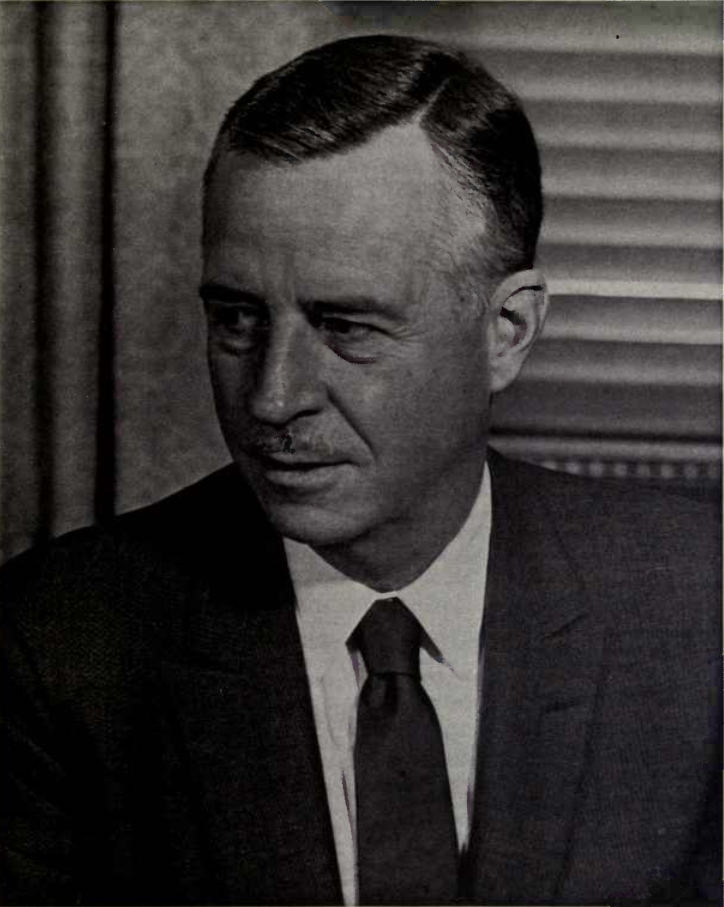

Assistant Attorney General of the California Department of Justice Criminal Division
- Appointed by: Governor of California

Assistant United States Attorney General and Chief of the United States Department of Justice Criminal Division
- In office February 2, 1953 – 1957
- Appointed by: President Dwight D. Eisenhower

Director of the Administrative Office of the United States Courts
- In office 1958–1972
- Appointed by: Chief Justice Earl Warren
- Preceded by: Henry P. Chandlier
- Succeeded by: Ernest C. Friesen

Personal details
- Born: 1904 Oakland, California, U.S.
- Died: 1978 (aged 73–74) Berkeley, California, U.S.
- Spouse: Elizabeth Bazata Olney
- Children: Elizabeth Anderson (lawyer); Margaret Olney (author); Warren Olney IV (journalist)
- Parents: Warren Olney Jr.; Mary McLean Olney
- Education: University of California
- Profession: Professor at University of California at Berkeley

Military service
- Branch/service: United States Marine Corps
- Rank: Lieutenant Colonel
- Unit: 4th Marine Aircraft Wing
- Battles/wars: World War II

Warren Olney III was an American attorney and law enforcement official, soldier, and Attorney General. He ran the Criminal Divisions of the California Department of Justice and later the United States Department of Justice (DOJ). He was an integral part of the creation of the Civil Rights Division of the DOJ, and helped write the Civil Rights Act of 1957.

== Early life ==
Olney was born in 1904 in Oakland, California. Olney's paternal grandfather, Warren Olney, was mayor of Oakland and cofounder of the Sierra Club. Olney's father, Warren Olney Jr., was an associate justice of the Supreme Court of California. This father-son duo started the law firm Olney & Olney in Oakland.

Olney's mother, formerly the dean of women, was a trustee of Pomona College from the 20's to the 60's. As a child, Olney was taken to see Buffalo Bill's Wild West Show, where he witnessed Annie Oakley's marksmanship. Olney was a member of Berkeley Troop 9 of the Boy Scouts of America under Scoutmaster H.C. Keran, where he won a medal from the Treasury Department for selling Liberty bonds during World War I.

Olney briefly attended a private school called Miss Randolph's, but his mother enrolled him at the Emerson School shortly afterward. After this, Olney attended another private school called the A to Zed School. At the age of fifteen, Olney attended University High School.

After high school, Olney boarded the steamship Yale in San Francisco and the Pacific Electric System in San Pedro to attend Pomona College. He attended Pomona for one year before transferring to the University of California at Berkeley, where he earned a Bachelor of Arts. While at Berkeley, Olney joined Alpha Delta Phi.

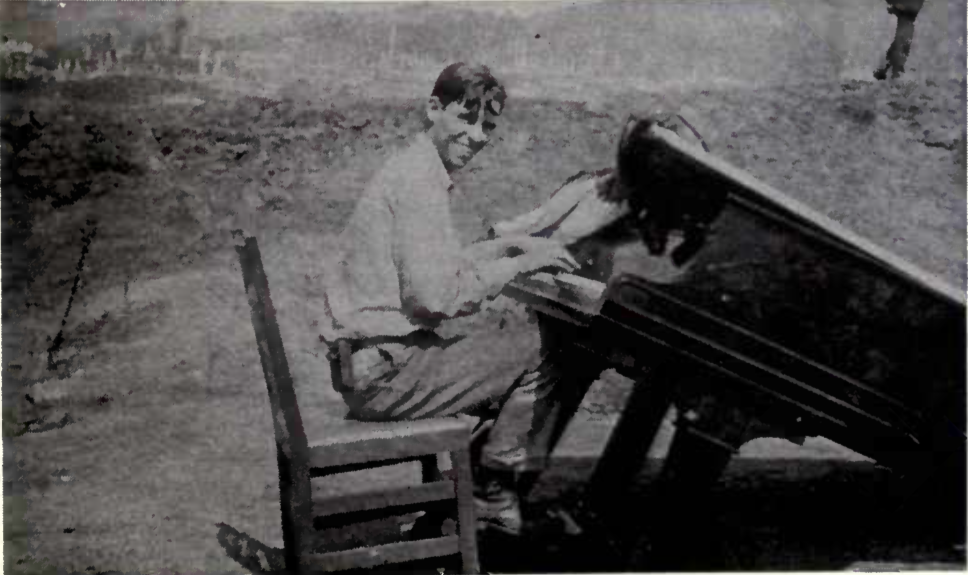
Warren Olney III plays a rescued piano with the Berkeley Fire raging in the background.

Olney also witnessed the 1923 Berkeley fire, where he and his college friends tried in vain to stop the fire from consuming homes - running out of water in the process. In a famous photograph of a young man playing the piano with the Berkeley fire raging in the background - Olney is the one playing the piano.

Ironically, even though his father and grandfather had been lawyers and had a family firm, Olney never had any intention to become a lawyer until his engagement to Elizabeth Bazata. In 1924, during his first year of law school, he has admitted to not knowing the definitions of "defendant" and "complainant."

== Legal career ==
Beginning on 15 October 1927, Olney served as Assistant District Attorney in Contra Costa County, California.

For a time, he went into private practice at Olney & Olney, the firm owned by his father and grandfather. While in this practice, Olney worked on a case to define the boundaries of Mare Island, and the interpretation of the Mexican grant of the island, relating to tides, and the justification for the existence of the Mare Island Naval Shipyard.

On 10 September 1930, Olney was hand-picked by Earl Warren to replace Frank Ogden as Assistant District Attorney in Alameda County, California. From that point, Earl Warren and Olney became lifelong friends and coworkers, and Warren would bring Olney along for the ride as he climbed the ranks of the American judicial system as one of his most trusted staffers. A few of the cases Olney was involved in at this office include the Gosden Case, the Del Masso Case, and the Point Lobos Shipboard Murder Case.

In 1939, Olney followed Warren to the California State Courts system, and took charge of the California Department of Justice Criminal Division as Assistant Attorney General of California for Warren, who was now the Attorney General of California. The major case Olney pursued at this time was the Gambling ships case, and the criminal Tony Cornero. In the prosecution of Cornero, Olney led a fleet of fast boats and law enforcement agents to board Cornero's main gambling ship, seizing evidence in the process.

=== World War II ===
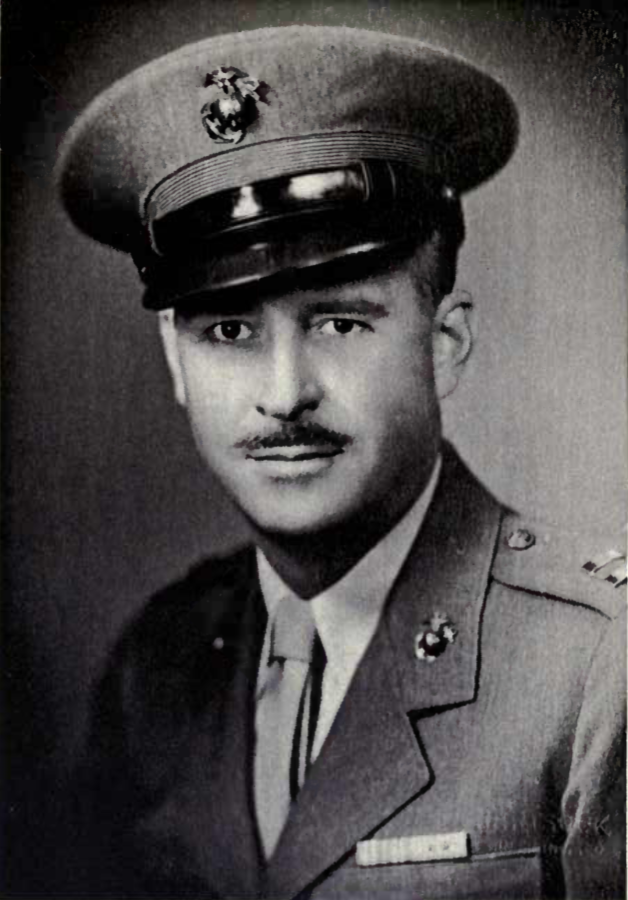
Warren Olney III served as a Lieutenant Colonel of the 4th Marine Air Wing during WWII

After the bombing of Pearl Harbor, Olney's office took part in the exclusion of the Japanese from California and the internment of Japanese Americans. Olney has stated that he justified this to himself by the thinking that he was protecting these Americans from attack by their fellow neighbors, and continued to advocate for their rights, even while enforcing their removal to concentration camps.

In November 1942, Olney commissioned as an officer in the United States Marine Corps, where he took part in the Pacific Campaign of World War II as a member of the Fourth Marine Aircraft Wing. Olney remained in the Marines until August 1945.

=== Return to practice ===
After the war, he returned to private practice with a law office of his own in San Francisco. While at this practice, Olney worked with attorneys Bob Kenny and Walter Gordon to sue the fraudulent practice of Arthur L. Bell and his "Mankind United," organization, later known as the Christ Church of the Golden Rule.

Olney served as Chief Counsel to the Special Crime Study Commission on Organized Crime in California under the Governor of California, Earl Warren. At this time, Olney focused on the cases of Artie Samish and the murder of Tom Keene, the George Rochester Suit, Fred Grange and the Mendocino Trial, and underworld figures.

Around this time, Olney taught criminal law at the University of California's Boalt Hall and the School of Criminology, at that time considered two different institutions. When he went to Washington, his position on the faculty was replaced by Arthur H. Sherry.

== Career in the Criminal Division ==
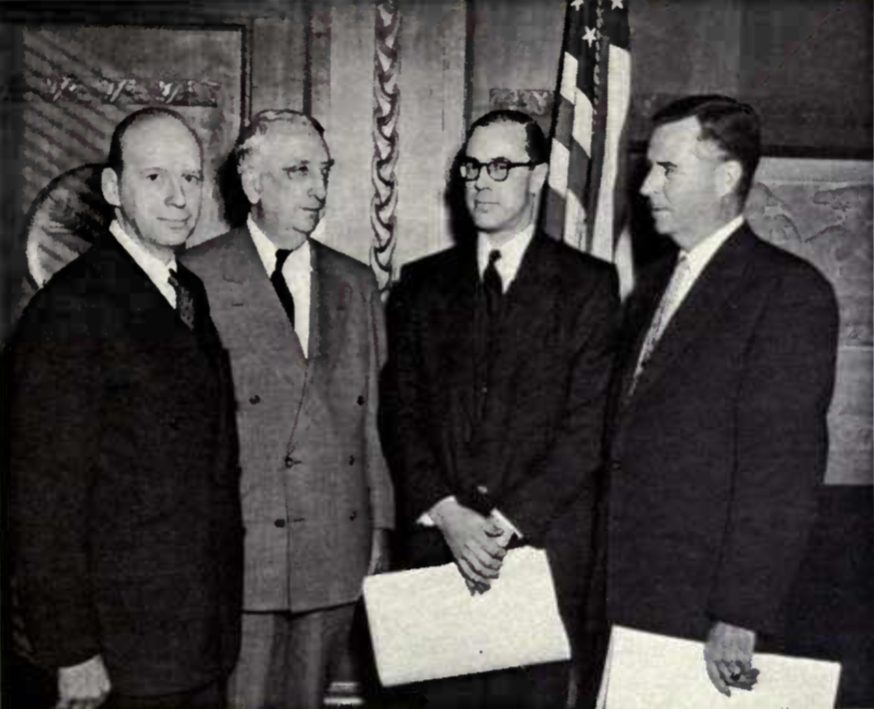
Olney swears in as Chief of the Criminal Division. From left: Attorney General Herbert Brownell, Chief Justice Fred M. Vinson, Assistant Attorney General H. Bryan Holland, and Warren Olney III.

In 1953, Olney was appointed by President Dwight D. Eisenhower as Assistant Attorney General of the United States to run the United States Department of Justice Criminal Division. While in this position, Olney successfully prosecuted against Congress members, federal agents, and other government employees. Olney held this position until 1957.

Some of the cases Olney was involved in at this time include;

- The Congressman Tom Bramblett Case
- The Investigation of Tom Clark
- The Rosenberg Case
- The Joseph Weinberg Case
- The Owen Lattimore Case
- The Jencks Case
- The Henry Dexter White Affair
- The Smith Act Prosecutions

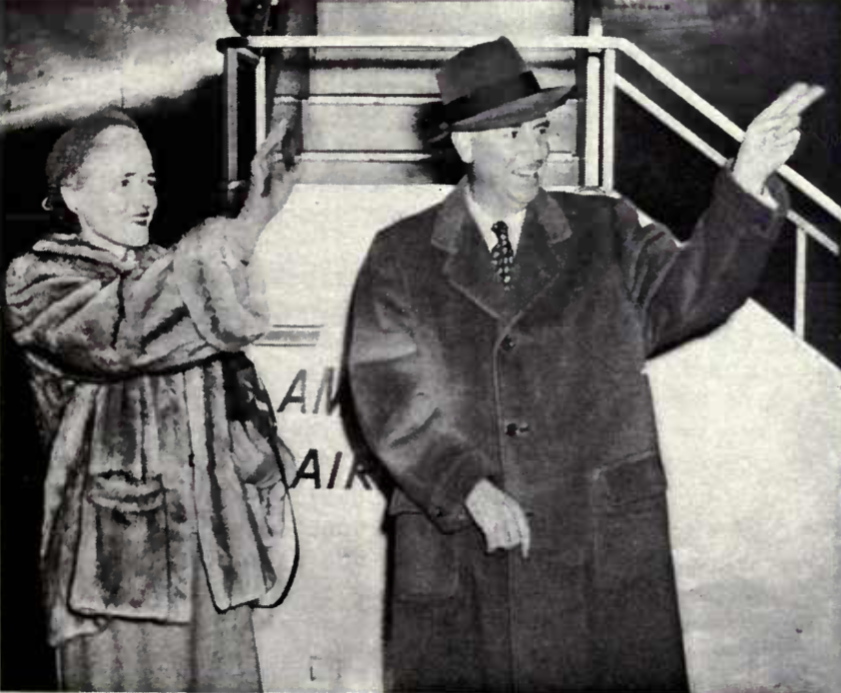
Olney and his wife Elizabeth departing from the Oakland Airport for President Eisenhower's inaugural ceremony, and Olney's new job as chief of the Criminal Division.

According to Senator Lieberman, in 1954, Olney responded to a question by Joseph McCarthy in a letter stating that "it was his right as a congressional investigator to order witnesses to answer questions about whether they know any Communists who might be working in the government or in defense plants." However, this does not indicate his position in favor or against the Senator's conduct. In June of that year, Olney reviewed the appeal case of Val R. Lorwin, an American government employee accused of being a Communist, and noticed what he called "irregularities" in the original case. This led to the immediate dismissal of the case and the removal of prosecutor William A. Gallagher from his office.

In April 1953, before the Senate Banking Committee, Olney charged the Federal Housing Authority (FHA) was "in partnership with lenders and promoters of home repairs with no responsibility for the victims of swindlers." Olney advocated for homeowners, saying that the Rental Apartment Project Loan Program allowed "unscrupulous builders to pocket hundreds of millions of dollars in windfall profits." Olney introduced the concepts of "dynamiters" and "suede shoe boys," to the Committee, saying that these men would sell intentionally bad repairs to homeowners at "exorbitant prices."

=== Civil Rights Act of 1957 ===
While running the Criminal Division, Olney was dually responsible for the DOJ's Civil Rights Section, meeting and communicating with leaders of the Civil Rights Movement, including Martin Luther King Jr. In a single year, Olney's Civil Rights Section handled approximately 9,000 complaints involving alleged violations of civil rights.

The Attorney General at the time, Herbert Brownell Jr., wrote of Olney;

"On October 10, 1956, Assistant Attorney General Warren Olney III testified concerning the facts regarding Ouachita Parish before the Senate Subcommittee on Privileges and Elections and recommended that the Subcommittee hold public hearings in advance of the general election. The Subcommittee took no action with respect to the situation. Had the Administration's program been in effect the Department would have been able to initiate a civil action for the purpose of restoring the Negro voters to the rolls of registered voters in time to vote in the November election."

Olney and Brownell felt that civil rights needed its own division at DOJ. In the final year of his tenure at this position, Olney successfully saw the creation of the United States Department of Justice Civil Rights Division. This division, and the position of its new director, was created in the Civil Rights Act of 1957. Olney also helped draft this legislation, which was the first major legislation in civil rights since the end of the American Civil War.

With regards to the legal aspects of the civil rights legislation, Olney placed himself in opposition to the Southern position, and specifically in direct opposition to Senator Sam Ervin. During the debate in the United States Senate over the amendment S 1735 - what was called the "trial-by-jury issue" of the Civil Rights Act - Olney said that the language of S 1735 "was a 'clever device to nullify' the civil rights proposals. If S 1735 were enacted, he said, the civil rights program 'would be no more effective than present laws in protecting the constitutional right to vote.' " He also stated that S 1735 would "emasculate the whole bill."

== Later career and retirement ==
In 1958, Olney was appointed Director of the Administrative Office of the United States Courts by Chief Justice of the Supreme Court, Earl Warren, where he worked for 10 years, until his retirement. Concurrently, Olney served as the Executive Officer of the Judicial Conference of the United States.

In 1963, Olney was considered for the position of General Council for the Warren Commission, but was replaced by J. Lee Rankin at the urging of Hale Boggs.

In 1968, Olney created the Federal Judicial Center. Olney died in 1978.

== Oral History Archive ==
A series of oral history conversations with Warren Olney III are preserved at https://californiarevealed.org/do/18e3c426-4098-4488-b8ac-781dd3317fd6

== See also ==
- Criminal Division Historical Timeline (external link)
