= Oliver Jesse Carter =

American judge (1911-1976)

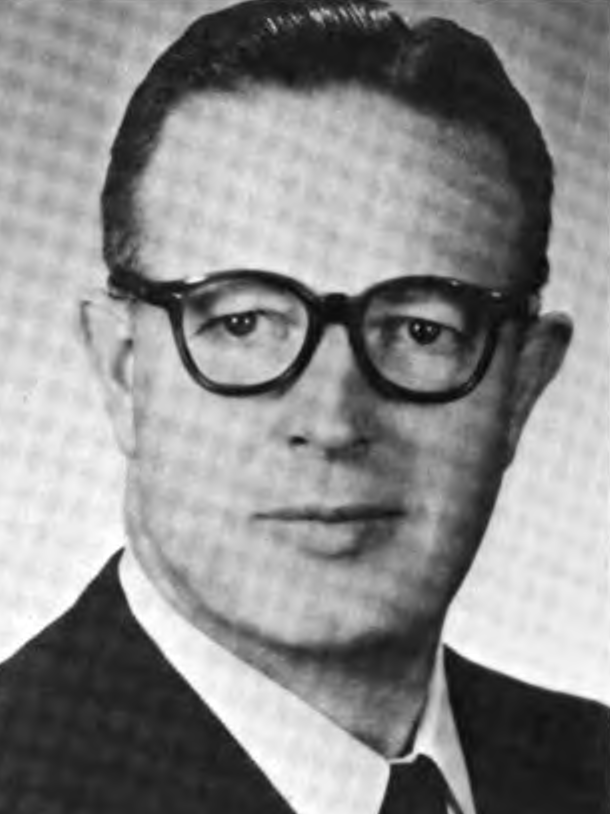

Senior Judge of the United States District Court for the Northern District of California
- In office April 7, 1976 – June 14, 1976

Chief Judge of the United States District Court for the Northern District of California
- In office 1970–1976
- Preceded by: George Bernard Harris
- Succeeded by: Robert Francis Peckham

Judge of the United States District Court for the Northern District of California
- In office September 27, 1950 – April 7, 1976
- Appointed by: Harry S. Truman
- Preceded by: Seat established by 63 Stat. 493
- Succeeded by: Cecil F. Poole

Member of the California Senate from the 5th district
- In office January 6, 1941 – January 3, 1949
- Preceded by: Jesse W. Carter
- Succeeded by: Edwin J. Regan

Personal details
- Born: Oliver Jesse Carter; April 7, 1911 San Francisco, California
- Died: June 14, 1976 (aged 65)
- Party: Democratic
- Relations: Jesse W. Carter (father)
- Education: University of California, Hastings; College of the Law (LL.B.)

Oliver Jesse Carter (April 7, 1911 – June 14, 1976) was a United States district judge of the United States District Court for the Northern District of California.

== Education and career ==
The son of future California Supreme Court Justice Jesse W. Carter, Carter was born in San Francisco, California where his father was attending the Golden Gate University School of Law. Carter received a Bachelor of Laws from the University of California, Hastings College of the Law in 1935. He was in private practice in Redding, California from 1936 to 1938. He was an assistant district attorney of Shasta County, California from 1938 to 1939. He returned to private practice in Redding from 1940 to 1950, and served in the California State Senate from 1941 to 1949.

== Federal judicial service ==
On September 27, 1950, Carter received a recess appointment from President Harry S. Truman to a new seat on the United States District Court for the Northern District of California created by 63 Stat. 493. Formally nominated to the same seat by President Truman on November 27, 1950, he was confirmed by the United States Senate on December 13, 1950, and received his commission on December 21, 1950. He served as Chief Judge from 1970 to 1976, assuming senior status on April 7, 1976. Carter served in that capacity until his death on June 14, 1976, of a heart attack.

=== Notable case ===
Carter presided over the eight-week trial of Patty Hearst, including the jury's return of a guilty verdict on March 20, 1976. Following the trial, Carter died unexpectedly prior to the resolution of Hearst's sentencing, which ultimately took place on September 24, 1976.

== Sources ==
Legal offices
Preceded by Seat established by 63 Stat. 493	Judge of the United States District Court for the Northern District of California; 1950–1976	Succeeded by Cecil F. Poole
Preceded by George Bernard Harris	Chief Judge of the United States District Court for the Northern District of California; 1970–1976	Succeeded by Robert Francis Peckham
