= 1859 California lieutenant gubernatorial election =

- September 7, 1859
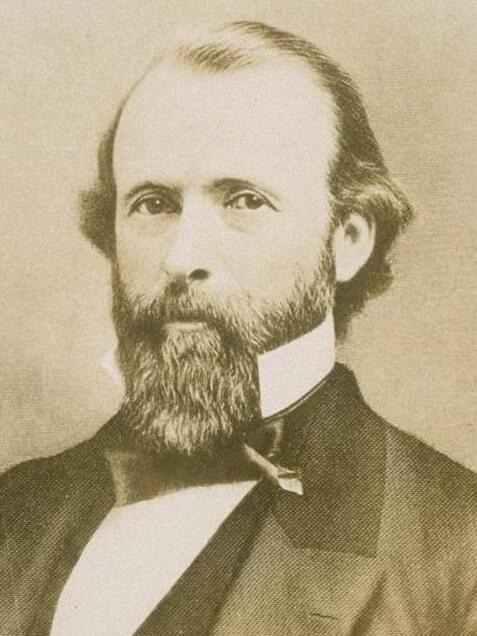

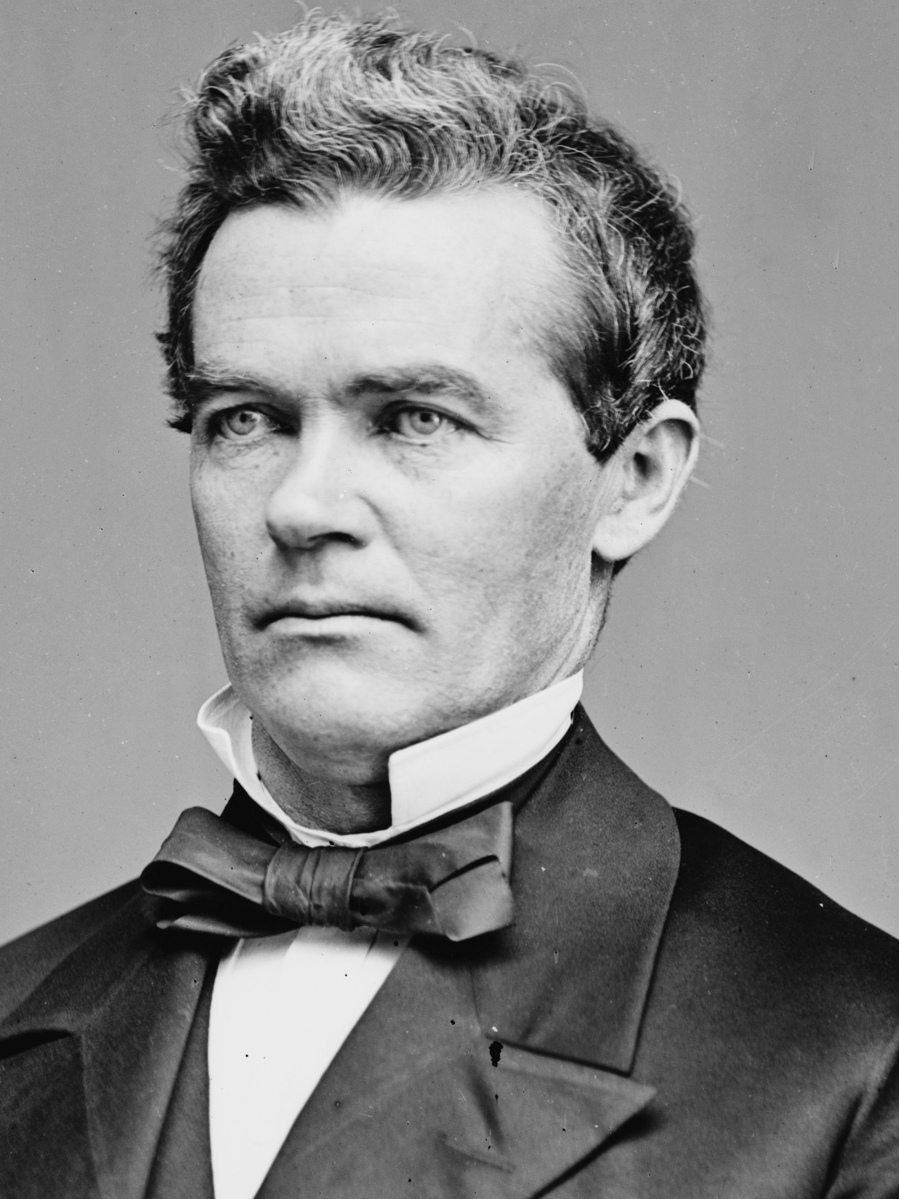

Nominee	John G. Downey	John Conness	James F. Kennedy
Party	Lecompton Democratic	Democratic	Republican
Popular vote	59,051	31,051	11,148
Percentage	58.32%	30.67%	11.01%
- County results Downey: 40–50% 50–60% 60–70% 70–80% 80–90% >90% Conness: 50–60%
Lieutenant Governor before election
Joseph Walkup
Democratic
Elected Lieutenant Governor
John G. Downey
Lecompton Democratic

The 1859 California lieutenant gubernatorial election was held on September 7, 1859, in order to elect the lieutenant governor of California. Lecompton Democratic nominee and former member of the California State Assembly John G. Downey defeated regular Democratic nominee John Conness and Republican nominee James F. Kennedy.

== General election ==
On election day, September 7, 1859, Democratic nominee John G. Downey won the election by a margin of 28,000 votes against his foremost opponent and fellow Democratic nominee John Conness, thereby retaining Democratic control over the office of lieutenant governor. Downey was sworn in as the 6th lieutenant governor of California on January 9, 1860.

=== Results ===
California lieutenant gubernatorial election, 1859
Party	Candidate	Votes	%
Lecompton Democratic	John G. Downey	59,051	58.32
Democratic	John Conness	31,051	30.67
Republican	James F. Kennedy	11,148	11.01
Total votes		101,250	100.00
Lecompton Democratic gain from Democratic			
