= 1863 United States Senate election in California =

United States Senate election in California

- February 10, 1863

Majority vote of both houses needed to win
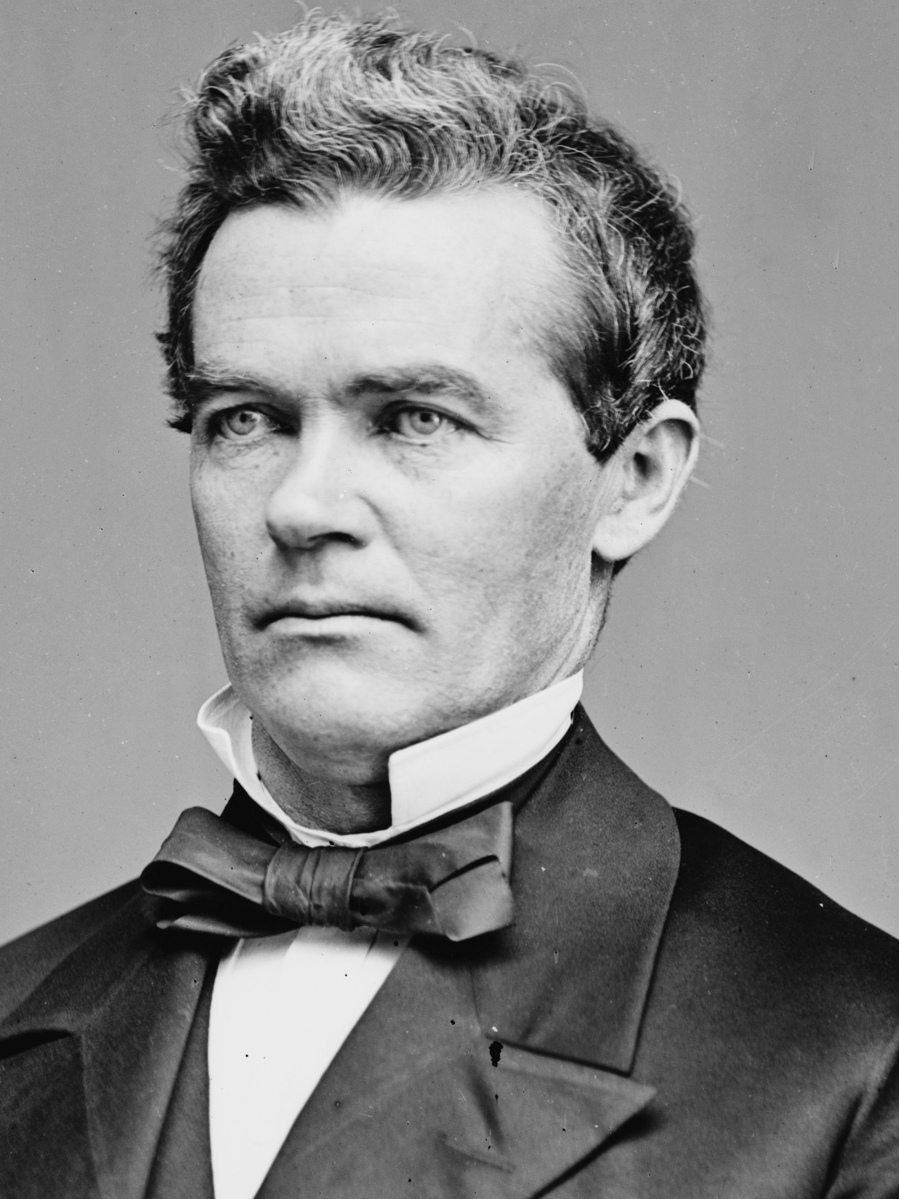

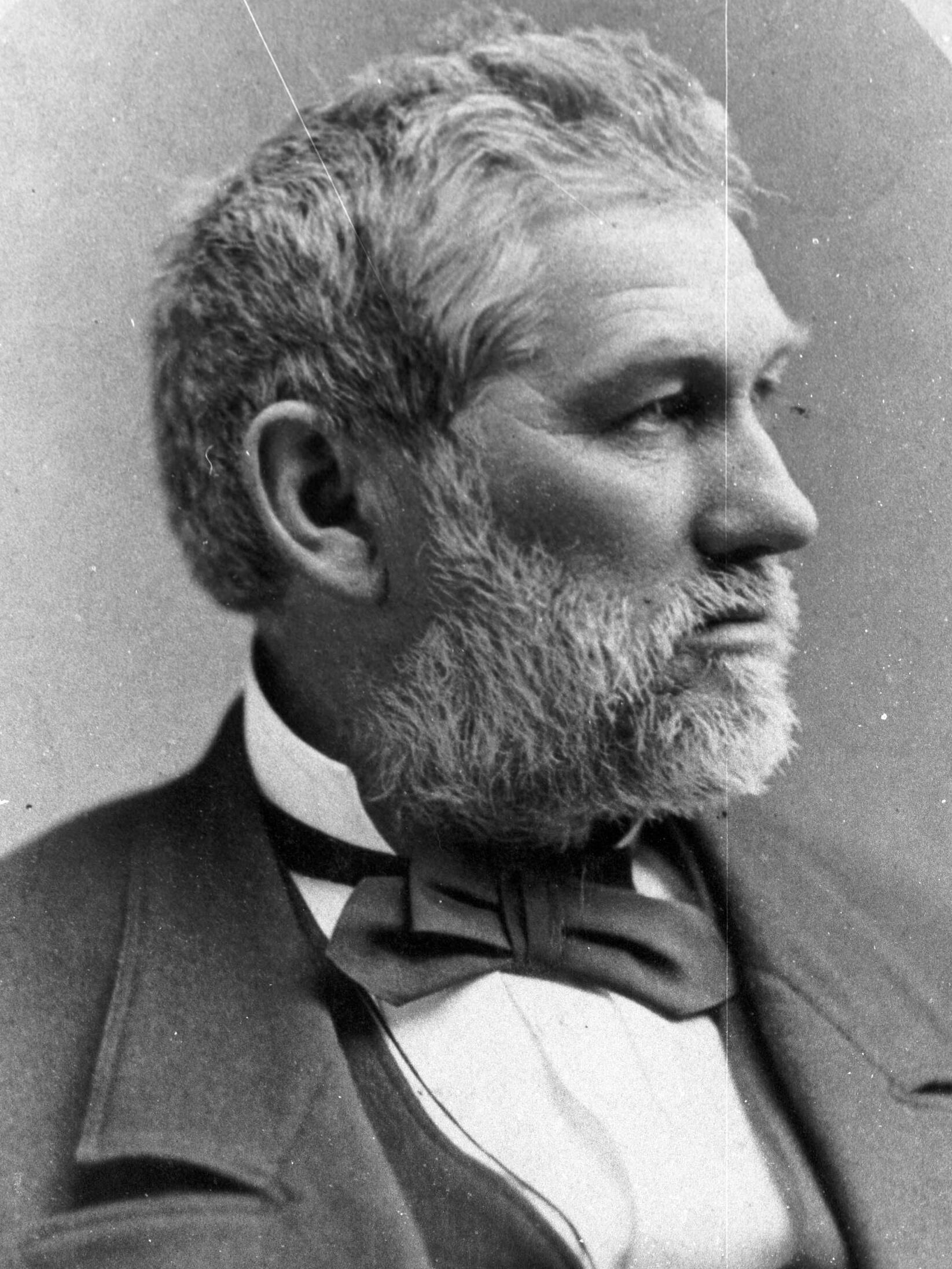
Nominee	John Conness	Benjamin Shurtleff
Party	National Union	Democratic
Joint session	98	15
Percentage	85.96%	13.16%
Senator before election
Milton Latham
Lecompton Democratic
Elected Senator
John Conness
National Union

The 1863 United States Senate election in California was held on February 10, 1863, by the California State Legislature to elect a U.S. senator (Class 1) to represent the State of California in the United States Senate. In a special joint session, former Democratic State Assemblyman John Conness was elected over fellow Democratic State Senator Benjamin Shurtleff. Conness was supported by the Union Party, while Shurtleff (despite being a unionist himself) was supported by the Chivalry Democrats.

== Results ==
Election in the legislature (joint session)
Party	Candidate	Votes	%
National Union	John Conness	98	85.96%
Democratic	Benjamin Shurtleff	15	13.16%
Democratic	Joseph P. Hoge	1	0.88%
Total votes		114	100.00%
