= Cecil F. Poole House =

Residence in San Francisco, built 1911

Cecil F. Poole House Joseph Leonard House
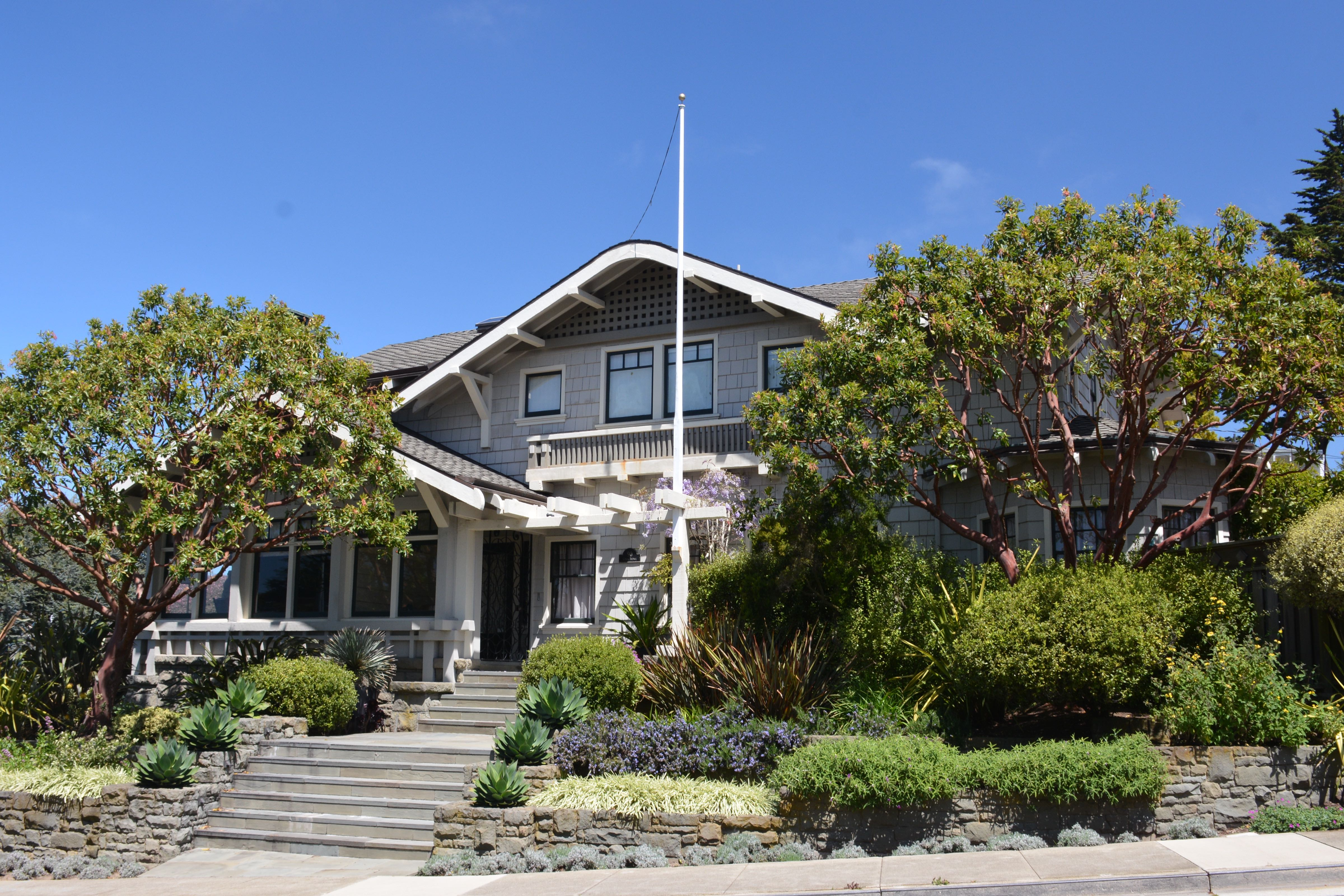

- Location within San Francisco County Location within California
- 37.727201°N 122.468902°W
- Location: 90 Cedro Avenue, San Francisco, California, United States

History
- Built: 1911; 115 years ago
- Built for: Joseph A. Leonard

Site notes
- Architectural style: American Craftsman style
- Owner: Joseph A. Leonard (1911–1920), Cecil F. Poole (1957–1982)

San Francisco Designated Landmark
- Designated: July 2, 2000
- Reference no.: 213

The Cecil F. Poole House, also known as the Joseph Leonard House, is a historic residence in Ingleside Terraces neighborhood of San Francisco, California, United States. During the Poole's residency in the home in 1958, an incident of cross-burning occurred. It is sometimes written as Joseph Leonard/Cecil F. Poole House.

It is listed as a San Francisco Designated Landmark since 2000. It is a private residence, and not open to the public.

== Pre-history ==
After the 1906 San Francisco earthquake and fire, the Ingleside Terraces neighborhood was developed from the 150 acres (61 ha) site of the former Ingleside Race Track. It was an exclusive residential development, created to distance itself from the city center and related urban issues. The homeowners in the neighborhood were subject to restrictive laws and had agreed to only sell to White people.

== History ==
The Craftman style house was built in 1911 for Joseph A. Leonard, the neighborhood developer. Leonard remained in the house until 1920.

The 1948 Supreme Court case Shelley v. Kraemer declared racial restrictions were illegal and unenforceable in courts, though the restrictions continued to be enforced. In 1957, racial covenents in the neighborhood were removed. Ingleside Terraces remained almost exclusively White neighborhood as late as 1960, however the surrounding neighborhoods were thirty-five percent non-White.

Cecil F. Poole, an African American lawyer who at the time was working as the assistant district attorney under Pat Brown, purchased in the house in 1957. The Poole family was the first non-White residents to the area. In June 1958, a cross-burning occurred on the lawn of the home, and the incident received a lot of news coverage. Two juvenile males and one adult male were brought to court in July 1958 for the burning of the cross, and freed by Judge Melvyn I. Cronin who described the incident as a "crude joke".

The Poole family lived in the house until 1982.

== See also ==
- African Americans in San Francisco
- List of San Francisco Designated Landmarks
