= Jesse W. Carter =

American judge (1888–1959)

Jesse Washington Carter
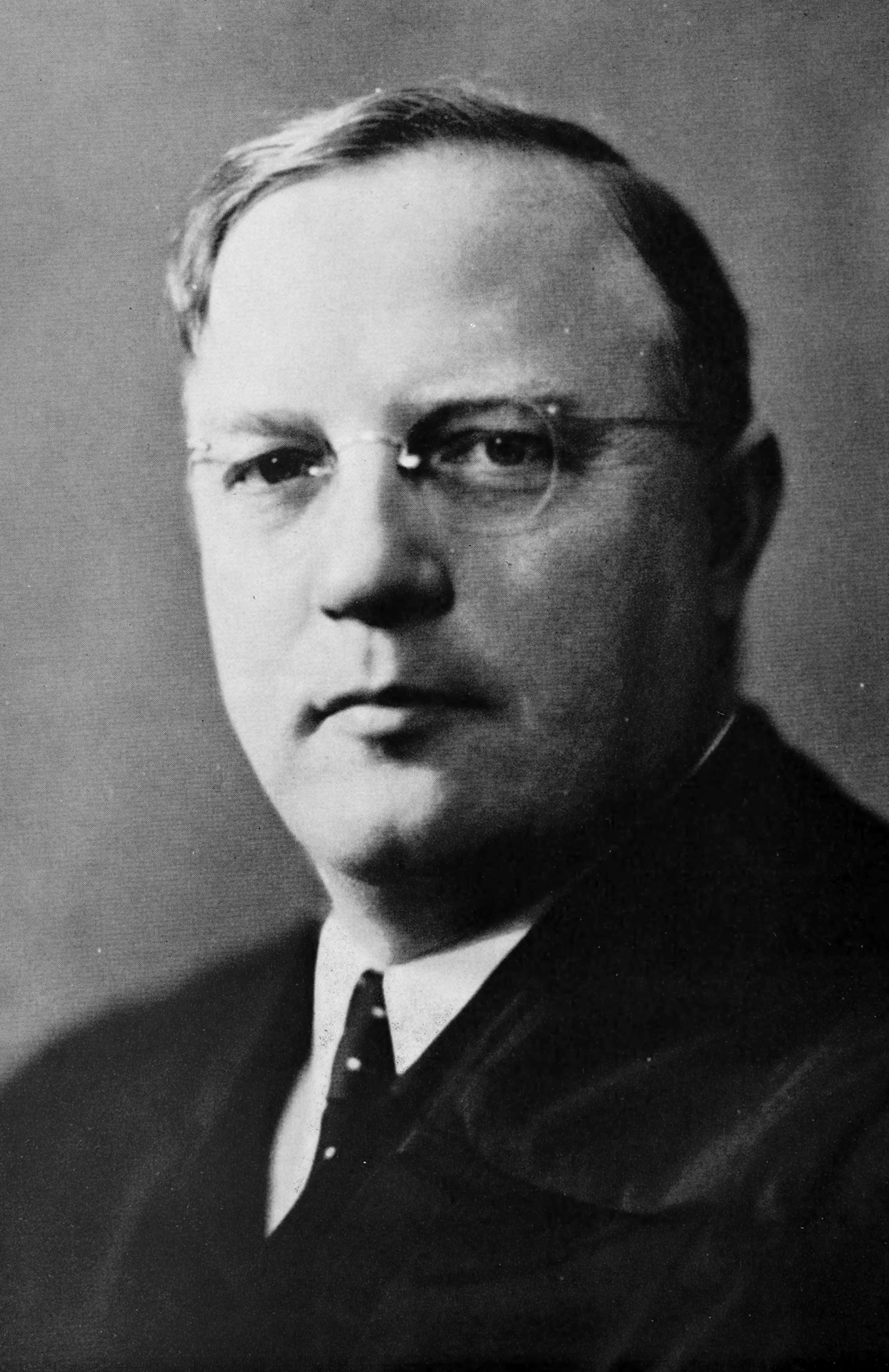
- Carter c. 1940

Associate Justice of the Supreme Court of California
- In office September 12, 1939 – March 15, 1959
- Nominated by: Culbert L. Olson
- Preceded by: Emmett Seawell
- Succeeded by: Raymond E. Peters

Member of the California Senate from the 5th district
- In office January 24, 1939 – September 12, 1939
- Preceded by: John B. McColl
- Succeeded by: Oliver Jesse Carter

Personal details
- Born: December 19, 1888 Carrville Trinity County, California, U.S.
- Died: March 15, 1959 (aged 70) Marin County, California, U.S.
- Party: Democratic
- Spouse: Tiny Elva Gish (m. 1910, div.); Thelma Harper Williams (m. 1941, div.); Jean Woodward (m. 1952)
- Children: Oliver Jesse Carter; Harlan Field Carter; Marian Carter Bui
- Education: Golden Gate College of the Law (J.D)
- Profession: Attorney, judge

Jesse Washington Carter (December 19, 1888 – March 15, 1959) was an American lawyer and Associate Justice of the Supreme Court of California from September 12, 1939 to March 15, 1959.

== Biography ==
Carter was born in Carrville, Trinity County, California, to Amanda Josephine Sweet and Asa Mannen Carter, a farmer and miner who had migrated to California by covered wagon. Carter was the second youngest of eight children, and was educated in the public schools. In 1905, he moved to San Francisco. He worked days for the city street railroad while studying at night at Golden Gate College of the Law, where he graduated in 1913.

Carter briefly practiced law in San Francisco and then, in 1914, opened offices in Redding where he practiced until 1939 with the law firm of Carter, Barrett, Finley and Carlton. In 1922, Carter undertook complex water rights litigation on behalf of a group of farmers who complained that the Pacific Gas and Electric Company unlawfully diverted the Pit River in Shasta County. The cases went through several appeals to the Supreme Court until their conclusion in 1938.

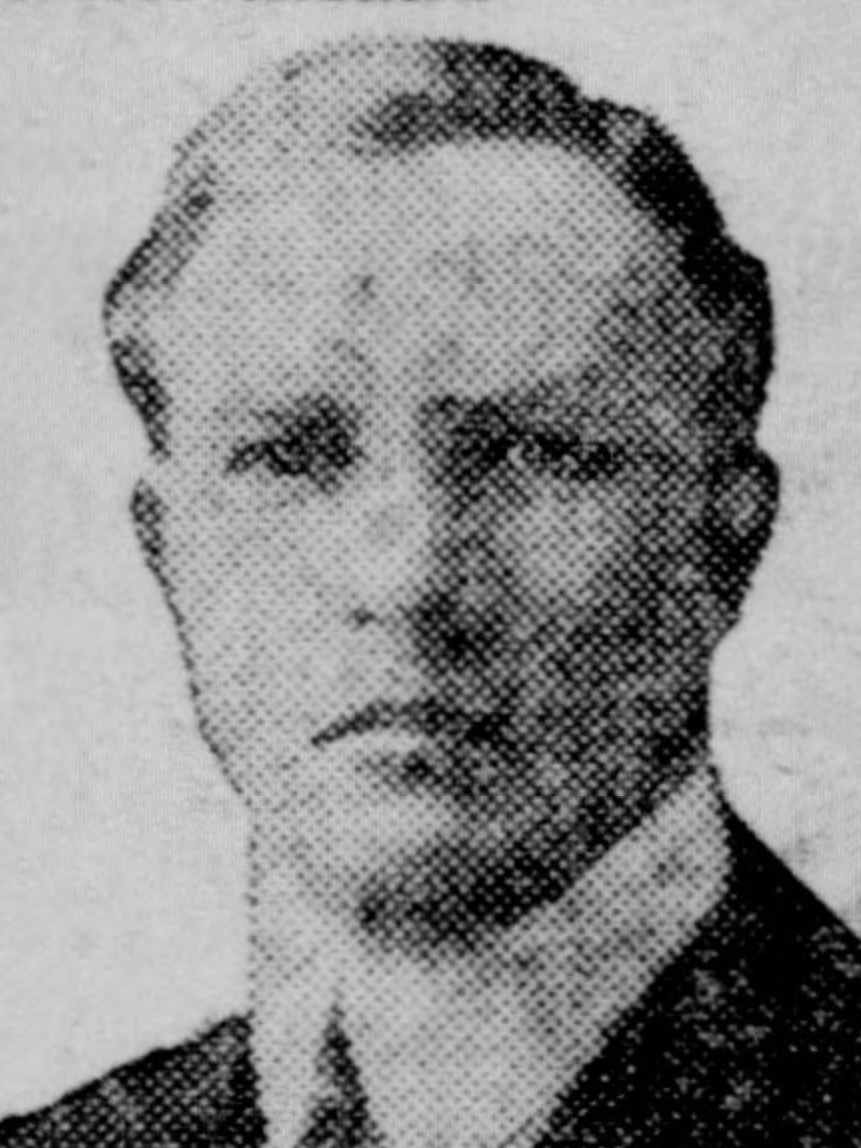
Carter in 1922

While in private practice, Carter held several public posts. He was elected District Attorney of Shasta County, a position he held from 1919 to 1927. He served as City Attorney of Mount Shasta from 1927 to 1939, and held the same post for the City of Redding from 1937 until 1939. In 1927, he was elected by his peers to the first Board of Governors of The State Bar of California, serving until 1933, the last two of which he was the Bar's vice-president. He served as attorney for the State Dental Board, and litigated the Painless Parker case.

In 1939, Carter was elected State Senator from the Fifth District, comprising Shasta and Trinity counties. The same year, Governor Culbert L. Olson appointed Carter an associate justice of the Supreme Court of California, where he served for nearly 20 years until his death on March 15, 1959. Renowned for his strongly held legal views, Carter earned the moniker the "great dissenter." At his appointment to the court, Carter refused to sign a loyalty oath, and in a series of cases stated such oaths are unconstitutional. In opposing the Levering Act and its ilk, Carter joined other California attorneys including UC Berkeley Dean William Prosser and Stanley Alexander Weigel in speaking out against McCarthyism.

Among Carter's most notable cases is his dissent in People v. Gonzales (1942), in which he advanced the reasoning that evidence obtain illegally by the police is inadmissible in court. This view was later adopted by the court in People v. Cahan (1955).

== Awards and honors ==
In 1950, Carter was awarded an honorary fellowship in the American College of Trial Lawyers. In 1956, he was awarded an honorary Doctor of Laws degree by Golden Gate College of the Law. His papers are held by the University of California.

== Personal life ==
Carter was married three times. In 1910, he married Tiny Elva Gish (August 5, 1892 – March 8, 1978), and they had three children: Oliver Jesse Carter, who became a United States District Court judge; Harlan Field Carter of Redding; and Marian Carter Bui of Redding. The marriage ended in divorce. On February 9, 1941, he married Thelma Harper Williams, a widowed secretary. On April 18, 1952 he remarried to Jean Woodward (December 30, 1887 – October 29, 1968), an attorney. He died March 15, 1959, and is buried in Mount Tamalpais Cemetery, Marin County, California.

== See also ==
- List of justices of the Supreme Court of California

Political offices
Preceded by Emmett Seawell	Associate Justice the Supreme Court of California; 1939–1959	Succeeded by Raymond E. Peters
