= Louis Sloss =

German-born American businessman

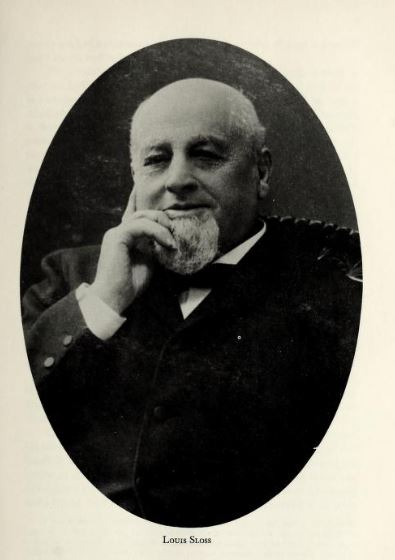
- Born: July 13, 1823; Untereisenheim, Kingdom of Bavaria (now Bavaria, Germany)
- Died: 1902 (age 79); San Francisco, California, United States
- Occupation: Businessman
- Known for: Co-founder of the Alaska Commercial Company
- Children: 5 including M. C. Sloss

Louis Sloss Sr. (July 13, 1823 – 1902) was an American businessman who co-founded the Alaska Commercial Company.

== Biography ==
Sloss was born in 1823 to a Jewish family in Untereisenheim, Kingdom of Bavaria.

In 1845, he immigrated to the United States first settling in Kentucky and then Nevada City, California in 1849 during the California Gold Rush. He opened a general merchandise store with partners Dr. Richard H. McDonald and C.H. Swift (who traveled with him from Kentucky) in Sacramento, California that sold all types of goods for new arrivals including horses, mules, wagons, tents, and mining equipment. Sloss and McDonald, then partnered with Simon Greenwald and Lewis Gerstle, and opened a wholesale grocery firm. After the Great Flood of 1862 devastated Sacramento, Sloss and Gerstle moved to San Francisco where they worked as stockbrokers. In 1868, after the purchase of Alaska from Russia, Sloss and Gerstle formed the Alaska Commercial Company. In the 1870s, they won a 20-year concession to harvest seals in Pribilof Islands; and expanded their retail activities to village stores in Alaska where natives could trade gold, fish, and furs for dry goods. The company eventually paid more in fees to the United States' Treasury than the United States paid to purchase Alaska.

Sloss served on the Board of Regents of the University of California and a trustee of the San Francisco Public Library. He served as president of Congregation B'nai Israel in Sacramento.

== Personal life ==
In 1855, he married Philadelphia-native Sarah Greenebaum. They had five children: Bella Sloss Lilienthal, Leon Sloss, Louis Sloss Jr., Joseph Sloss, and Judge Marcus C. Sloss.

Sloss Sr. built the Lilienthal–Orville Pratt House (1876) at 1818–1824 California Street, San Francisco; it is a San Francisco Designated Landmark since 1973.

The Liberty Ship, SS Louis Sloss, is named after him.
