= Peter Sloss =

Scottish meteorologist and broadcaster

Peter Sloss is a Scottish meteorologist and broadcaster currently working for BBC Scotland. Sloss has worked for the BBC Weather Centre and occasionally presents the weather on Reporting Scotland and on BBC Radio Scotland's news programmes.
