= M. C. Sloss =

American judge (1869–1958)

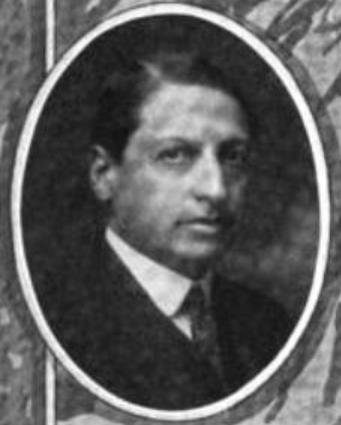

Associate Justice of the Supreme Court of California
- In office December 19, 1906 – March 1, 1919
- Appointed by: Governor George Pardee
- Preceded by: Walter Van Dyke
- Succeeded by: Warren Olney Jr.

Judge of the San Francisco Superior Court
- In office January 1901 – December 18, 1906

Personal details
- Born: Marcus Cauffman Sloss; February 28, 1869 New York, New York, U.S.
- Died: May 17, 1958 (aged 89) San Francisco, California, U.S.
- Spouse: Hattie L. Hecht (m. 1899)
- Education: Harvard University (A.B., M.A.); Harvard Law School (LL.B.)

Marcus Cauffman ("Max" or "Dick") Sloss (February 28, 1869 – May 17, 1958) was an American lawyer who served as an associate justice of the Supreme Court of California from December 19, 1906, to March 1, 1919.

== Early life and education ==
Sloss was born in New York, New York, to Sarah Greenebaum and Louis Sloss, while they were traveling from their home in San Francisco. His father was born in 1823 in Bavaria, Germany, and in 1848 emigrated to the United States. The next year Sarah and Louis crossed the plains on a wagon train to Sacramento, California. In 1861, the family moved to San Francisco. He founded Louis Sloss & Company, later named the Alaska Commercial Company, and sold supplies to the gold prospectors. He served as a Regent of the University of California from 1885 until his death in 1902.

Marcus attended the public schools and graduated from Boys High School. In 1886, he entered Harvard University and in 1890 received his A.B. degree, magna cum laude and Phi Beta Kappa. He studied at Harvard Law School and in 1893 was awarded both Bachelor of Laws and Master of Arts degrees.

== Legal and judicial career ==
After graduation, Sloss return to San Francisco and joined the firm of Chickering, Thomas & Gregory, where he became a partner. In November 1900, Sloss was elected judge of the San Francisco Superior Court for a term commencing January 1, 1901. In 1906, Governor George Pardee appointed Sloss to the California Supreme Court when he was 37 years old. He was re-elected twice to the high court: in November 1906, and again in 1910. In 1919, he resigned to return to private practice with Sloss, Ackerman & Bradley, and later with his two sons and John G. Eliot, under the firm name of Sloss & Eliot.

Sloss' notable cases include Western Indemnity Co. v. Pillsbury (1913). In that case, Sloss wrote the opinion upholding the constitutionality of the State's Workers' Compensation Act when other state courts had struck down the progressive scheme. In private practice, his prominent cases include Tulare Dist. v. Lindsay-Strathmore Dist. (1935), a complex water law matter, and Meridian, Ltd. v. San Francisco (1939), concerning the city's role in the Hetch Hetchy aqueduct.

Sloss was appointed the arbitrator to the National Longshoremen's Board established during the 1934 West Coast waterfront strike. During World War II, he was chair of the National War Labor Board's regional advisory committee.

== Bar and civic activities ==
Sloss was a member of the American Law Institute, and a governor of both the California State Bar and the Bar Association of San Francisco. In 1913, Sloss was elected vice-president of the Harvard Alumni Association, and in 1926 was a regional chairman of the Harvard Law School fundraising drive. He was a fundraiser for the Jewish National Fund, and was devoted to other Jewish charities. From 1930 to 1950, Sloss was a trustee of Stanford University. He was also a member of the Bohemian Club.

== Personal life ==
In June 1899 he married Hattie L. Hecht of Boston, Massachusetts. They had a daughter, Margaret Sloss Kuhns, and two sons, Richard L. and Frank H., who both graduated from Harvard Law School and joined their father's firm.

== See also ==
- List of justices of the Supreme Court of California

Political offices
Preceded by Walter Van Dyke	Associate Justice of the California Supreme Court; 1906–1919	Succeeded by Warren Olney Jr.
