= Warren Olney =

American lawyer

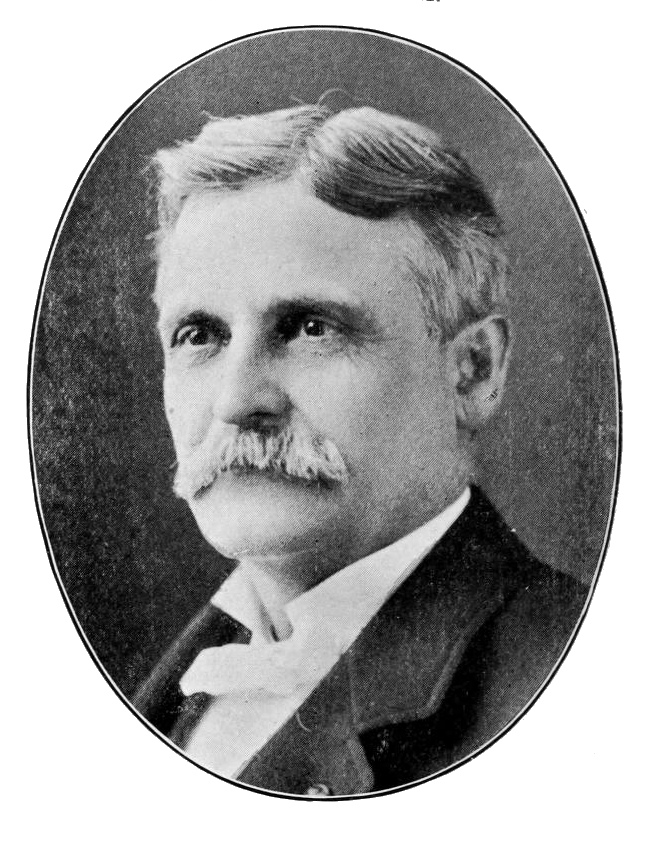

Mayor of Oakland
- In office 1903–1905
- Preceded by: Anson Barstow
- Succeeded by: Frank K. Mott

Personal details
- Born: March 11, 1841
- Died: June 2, 1921 (aged 80)

Warren Olney, Sr. (March 11, 1841 – June 2, 1921) was an American lawyer, conservationist, and politician, in California.

He was a founding member, alongside John Muir and the young botany professor, Willis Linn Jepson of the University of California at Berkeley, of the Sierra Club. From 1903 to 1905 he served as the 34th Mayor of Oakland, California.

== Early life ==
Olney was born near the Fox River in frontier Iowa and was raised in abject poverty and with little formal schooling. His family moved often and his education up to the age of 10 consisted of brief stints in log or early frame school houses and from his father who had only briefly attended school himself. Typical of the times, his mother was uneducated. She finally taught herself to read and write so as to communicate with her son during his military service during the Civil war. From the age of 10 through 17 no record has been found to verify whatever education he received. Where and however he got it, he learned his lessons well enough to apply for and receive a position as a teacher in Pella, Iowa. That community was fairly large and modern for the time and desired a thorough and high standard of education for their children. In Pella he was a teacher, superintendent of schools, and a college freshman, oddly enough in that order. During that time, one of the students in his school was to become a famous (or infamous as may be) future western hero, Wyatt Earp. Nothing in Olney's history suggests he was ever aware of or concerned with the connection if any. In 1860 Olney left Pella's Central University (now Central College) to travel to Missouri, a slave state. All that is known about his travels there is that he again taught.

== Civil War service ==
When Fort Sumter was fired upon in April, 1861 Olney hastened back to Pella and enlisted. He did not make the first group of 90day volunteers so enlisted in the 3rd Iowa for 3 years with the 3rd Iowa Infantry. Their first year of service was guarding rail lines in upper Missouri. Other than some run ins with guerrillas they saw no action. In the spring of 1862, the 3rd Iowa was included in General Grant's buildup of forces at Pittsburg's Landing, Tennessee. Here he was involved in the battle of Shiloh. His unit held and fought well before breaking and running in the general rout ending the first day's battle. Olney was struck in the chest by a spent round that did not break skin but apparently knocked him out. He came to and joined the general rout not wanting to be captured. Though too spent to penetrate, the bullet that struck Olney left him too stiff and sore to take any part in the second day's actions. His "wounding" must have been observed because his records contain a note that he was killed there. Olney continued in the pursuit of the Confederate army following the battle but, suffering from illness took advantage of the opportunities open to soldiers of his education an applied for and received a position as a clerk in the army with duty at St. Louis, Missouri. This was effectively the end of his combat role in the army.

In 1864 he applied for and received a commission as a captain in command of a company in the 2nd Missouri Volunteers of Colored Infantry, accepted into US service as the 65th United States Colored Infantry. Olney remained in command of this unit to war's end seeing service in Louisiana but taking no part in combat operations. Olney struggled with sickness and repeated sought discharge thereby. Ironically, the 65th was only notable for having one of if not the highest death rate by disease of any regiment in the army with losses of 6 Officers and 749 Enlisted men by disease. One ultimate irony is that, while on convalescent leave in Iowa he again applied for discharge from service. It was approved. However, he seems not to have received word of his release from service and returned to his unit remaining with it until his final discharge in August 1865.

== Career ==
Done with military service, he returned to Iowa to marry his college sweetheart and attended the University of Michigan, there earning a degree in law. In 1868 he and his bride sailed from New York City for San Francisco, California. There he sought and received acceptance in a prestigious law firm. In time he opened his own law office in San Francisco.

In 1903 Olney became the 34th Mayor of Oakland, where he had made his home, serving one term to 1905. He held strong views that California cities and communities needed a secure water supply system separate from private independent suppliers. This led to the damming of the Tuolumne River by O'Shaughnessy Dam in 1923, which flooded the Hetch Hetchy Valley under Hetch Hetchy Reservoir. Olney supported this project, resulting in a bitter separation from John Muir, his other conservationist friends, and with the Sierra Club, who staunchly opposed the environmental destruction. The project was completed in Yosemite National Park, and remains controversial to the present day.

== Death ==
Warren Olney, Sr. died at 80 years of age on June 2, 1921, from pneumonia. He is buried in the Mountain View Cemetery in Oakland, California.

== Family ==
Olney's son and grandson, who shared his name, were also lawyers. His son, Warren Olney, Jr., served on the Supreme Court of California from 1919 to 1921. His grandson, Warren Olney III was appointed by President Dwight D. Eisenhower as an Assistant Attorney General to oversee the Criminal Division of the United States Department of Justice. Although Warren Olney III was Chief Justice Earl Warren's choice to be chief counsel for the Warren Commission, J. Lee Rankin was chosen instead.

His great-grandson, Warren Olney IV is a noted Los Angeles-based broadcast journalist.

== See also ==
- List of mayors of Oakland, California
- Sierra Club

Political offices
Preceded by Anson Barstow	Mayor of Oakland, California; 1903–1905	Succeeded by Frank K. Mott
