= Cecil F. Poole =

American judge (1914–1997)

Cecil Francis Poole
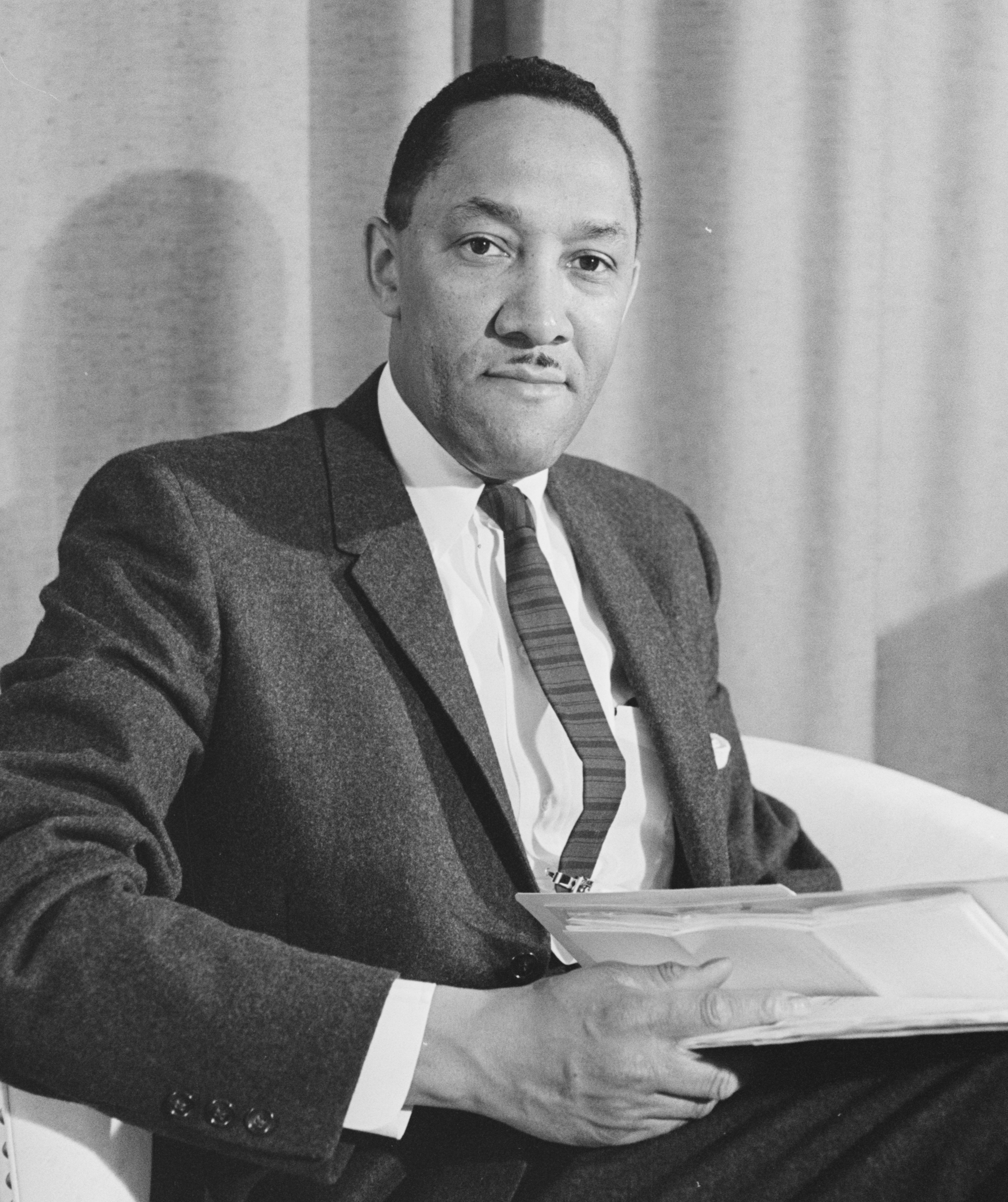
- Poole in 1961

Senior Judge of the United States Court of Appeals for the Ninth Circuit
- In office January 15, 1996 – November 12, 1997

Judge of the United States Court of Appeals for the Ninth Circuit
- In office November 27, 1979 – January 15, 1996
- Appointed by: Jimmy Carter
- Preceded by: Seat established by 92 Stat. 1629
- Succeeded by: Richard Paez

Judge of the United States District Court for the Northern District of California
- In office July 23, 1976 – March 31, 1980
- Appointed by: Gerald Ford
- Preceded by: Oliver Jesse Carter
- Succeeded by: Thelton Henderson

Personal details
- Born: Cecil Francis Poole; July 25, 1914 Birmingham, Alabama, U.S.
- Died: November 12, 1997 (aged 83) San Francisco, California, U.S.
- Education: University of Michigan (AB, LLB); Harvard University (LLM)

Cecil Francis Poole (July 25, 1914 – November 12, 1997) was a United States circuit judge of the United States Court of Appeals for the Ninth Circuit, a United States district judge of the United States District Court for the Northern District of California, and a United States Attorney for the Northern District of California. He was the first African American to serve as a United States Attorney (outside of the United States Virgin Islands), the first African American to serve as a Judge of the Northern District of California and the second African American to serve as a Judge of the Ninth Circuit.

== Early life ==
Poole was born in Birmingham, Alabama to William and Eva Poole. His family moved to Pittsburgh, Pennsylvania when Poole was four years old. His father and uncle operated a mortuary there. His mother was active in the chapter of the National Association for the Advancement of Colored People. Poole attended Schenley High School, where he was a photographer for the school yearbook, played violin in the school orchestra, and was a member of the track team.

Poole had three siblings: one died in infancy, a second was a brother also named William, and third was a sister named Marjorie Ellen.

== Education and career ==
Poole received an Artium Baccalaureus degree from the University of Michigan in 1935. He received a Bachelor of Laws from the University of Michigan Law School in 1938. Poole then received a Master of Laws from Harvard Law School in 1939. After graduation from law school and gaining admission to the Pennsylvania State Bar in 1940, Poole entered the private practice of law in Pittsburgh. He remained in private practice from 1940 to 1942 and then moved to Washington, D.C. to work for the National Labor Relations Board. By then, World War II had begun. Shortly after moving to the nation's capital Poole joined the military, serving in the United States Army, first as an enlistee and then as a commissioned officer, from 1942 to 1945.

After World War II Poole served as Chief of the Regional Appellate Division of the United States Office of Price Administration in San Francisco, California from 1946 to 1947. He then re-entered the private practice of law in San Francisco in 1947 and continued in that work until 1951. Poole then became an assistant district attorney and chief of the San Francisco County Superior Court division staff of the district attorney's office, posts he held from 1951 to 1958, and also served as an Instructor for the Golden Gate University School of Law from 1952 to 1958.

Poole was secretary and legal counsel to Governor Pat Brown from 1958 to 1961. Among the tasks that he undertook in that role was to advise Brown about whether to grant a request by Caryl Chessman for executive clemency.

President John F. Kennedy nominated Poole to be the United States Attorney for the Northern District of California on April 18, 1961. The U.S. Senate confirmed the nomination by unanimous consent on June 7, 1961. Poole became the first African American United States Attorney in the nation's history and served until he resigned on January 31, 1970.

Poole's tenure as United States attorney overlapped with a period of protest against the Vietnam War, both nationwide and in the Bay Area. In 1968 Poole refused to file sedition charges against a group of protesters outside of a military base near Oakland, instead insisting that United States marshals release the group to local law enforcement. This decision drew the ire of California Senator George Murphy, who would later block Poole's confirmation to a federal judgeship in response.

Poole also refused to allow federal law enforcement officers to arrest members of the Black Panther Party who were peacefully protesting in downtown San Francisco and declined to prosecute cases of draft evasion unless the administrative record supported, in his view, a strong chance for conviction.

After leaving the United States attorney's office Poole returned to the private practice of law in San Francisco from 1970 to 1976, working for the law firm Jacobs, Sills & Coblentz. Among the clients Poole represented during that time were rock bands Jefferson Airplane and The Doobie Brothers, as well as singer Janis Joplin and concert promoter Bill Graham.

Poole was Regents Professor of Law at the University of California, Berkeley from 1969 to 1970. He was also a fellow in residence at Yale Law School in 1970.

== Federal judicial service ==
Poole was nominated by President Gerald Ford on June 18, 1976, to a seat on the United States District Court for the Northern District of California vacated by Judge Oliver Jesse Carter. He was confirmed by the United States Senate on July 23, 1976, and received his commission the same day, becoming the first African American to serve on that court. His service was terminated on March 31, 1980, after his elevation to the Ninth Circuit.

Poole was nominated by President Jimmy Carter on October 11, 1979, to the United States Court of Appeals for the Ninth Circuit, to a new seat created by 92 Stat. 1629. He was confirmed by the Senate on November 26, 1979, and received his commission on November 27, 1979, becoming the second African American to serve on this court. Poole assumed senior status on January 15, 1996. He did so after experiencing the onset of Alzheimer's disease. His service was terminated on November 12, 1997, due to his death from complications of pneumonia in San Rafael.

Notable Decisions

In Eales v. Environmental Lifestyles, Inc., one of the first cases applying the Architectural Works Copyright Protection Act of 1990, Poole's opinion for the court held that fair market value should be the measurement of damages in a case involving infringement of the copyright in an architectural plan.

In United States v. Rodriguez, Poole's majority opinion ordered the suppression of evidence in a criminal case where federal agents had engaged in racial profiling. The defendant in the case had been stopped by U.S. Border Patrol agents while driving alone in a 14-year old Ford Ranchero on Interstate 8 in southern California. According to Poole's opinion for the court, the agents "noted that he looked Hispanic, sat up straight, kept both hands on the wheel, and looked straight ahead. He did not 'acknowledge' the agents, which they thought suspicious since, as they testified, 'all the other traffic that went by — people had their feet out the window.'"

In Larry P. by Lucille P. v. Riles, Poole's majority opinion held that the California State Board of Education and the San Francisco Unified School District could not use standardized intelligence tests to determine whether to place African American children in classes for the "educable mentally retarded".

Failed nominations to the district court

President Lyndon B. Johnson had earlier nominated Poole to a seat on the United States District Court for the Northern District of California on May 29, 1968. However, California Senator George Murphy objected to the nomination. South Carolina Senator Strom Thurmond then invoked a rule of the Committee on the Judiciary, which prevented the Senate from taking up Poole's nomination before the 91st United States Congress was seated in early January 1969.

Johnson re-nominated Poole to a seat on the United States District Court for the Northern District of California on January 9, 1969, but Richard M. Nixon, who was elected to succeed Johnson in November 1968 and inaugurated January 20, 1969, withdrew the nomination on January 23, 1969.

== Personal life ==
Poole married Charlotte Crump, a graduate of the University of Minnesota and journalist, in 1942. Poole and his wife were the parents of two daughters, Gayle Alexandra (b. 1947) and Patricia Mary (b. 1952). Mrs. Poole died in February 1991.

The San Francisco home owned by Poole and his wife, located at 90 Cedro Avenue in the Ingleside Terraces neighborhood of the city, was designated a San Francisco Designated Landmark on May 22, 2000. During the Poole's residency in the home an incident of cross-burning occurred.

== See also ==
- List of African-American federal judges
- List of African-American jurists
- List of first minority male lawyers and judges in California
- Lyndon B. Johnson judicial appointment controversies

== Sources ==
- Coile, Zachary. "Legal pioneer Cecil Poole dies at 83 -- First black federal judge in Northern California," San Francisco Chronicle (November 14, 1997). Retrieved from Legal pioneer Cecil Poole dies at 83.
- Haskins, James. Cecil Poole: A Life In The Law (Ninth Judicial Circuit Historical Society, 2003).
- Goodloe, T. (2010, November 22) Cecil F. Poole (1914–1997). Retrieved from Cecil F. Poole (1914-1997) •

Legal offices
Preceded by Oliver Jesse Carter	Judge of the United States District Court for the Northern District of California; 1976–1980	Succeeded by Thelton Henderson
Preceded by Seat established by 92 Stat. 1629	Judge of the United States Court of Appeals for the Ninth Circuit; 1979–1996	Succeeded by Richard Paez
