= John Conness =

American politician

- Portrait by Brady c. 1863–1865

United States Senator from California
- In office March 4, 1863 – March 3, 1869
- Preceded by: Milton S. Latham
- Succeeded by: Eugene Casserly

Member of the California State Assembly
- In office January 2, 1860 – January 6, 1862
- Preceded by: Multi-member district
- Succeeded by: Multi-member district
- Constituency: 18th district
- In office January 3, 1853 – January 1, 1855
- Preceded by: Multi-member district
- Succeeded by: Multi-member district
- Constituency: 12th district

Personal details
- Born: September 22, 1821 Abbey, County Galway, Ireland
- Died: January 10, 1909 (aged 87) Jamaica Plain, Massachusetts, U.S.
- Resting place: Cedar Grove Cemetery; Boston, Massachusetts
- Party: Democratic Party (before 1863); Republican (after 1863)
- Other political affiliations: National Union (1863–1868)
- Spouse(s): Charlotte Stockton (m. 1849; died 1866) Mary Davis (m. 1869)
- Children: 6
- Occupation: Craftsman, merchant, pioneer, businessman, politician

John Conness (September 22, 1821 – January 10, 1909) was an Irish-born American businessman who served as a U.S. senator (1863–1869) from California during the American Civil War and the early years of Reconstruction. He introduced a bill to establish Yosemite National Park and voted to abolish slavery. His advocacy of Chinese immigration and civil rights cost him his seat.

== Early life and education ==
Born in Abbey, County Galway, Ireland, on September 22, 1821, Conness was the youngest of fourteen children. His father was Walter Conness, whom John described as "a very dignified and intellectual man, one whom men of all positions came to for counsel: being also a man of rare courage and independence."

== Immigration and career ==
In 1836 Conness arrived in the United States at age 15 as an immigrant. For more than a decade on the East Coast in New York, Conness learned to make pianofortes and also worked as a merchant. He emigrated to California in 1849 to join the excitement and promise of the California Gold Rush.

He was among the thousands of "forty-niners" attracted by the Gold Rush in the Sierra Nevada, and the hundreds of thousands who quickly followed. For two years, he mined Mormon Island, and the Middle Fork of the American River, and was interested in the industry for the rest of his life. Having made a stake, he settled in the new community of Georgetown and operated a store selling supplies to miners.

The state was bustling with new people. In the 1850s, the Democratic Party was the only partisan organization, and it stretched to accommodate the many interests of the new residents. Elected to the State Assembly in the 1853–54 and 1860–61 sessions, Conness was nominated as the Anti-Lecompton Democratic candidate for Lieutenant Governor in 1859 and the Union Democratic candidate for Governor in the 1861 election.

After losing to John G. Downey in the first election and Leland Stanford in the second, Conness was elected by the legislature to the United States Senate for the term beginning in 1863. (Senators were selected by state legislatures until the 17th Amendment was ratified in 1913.)

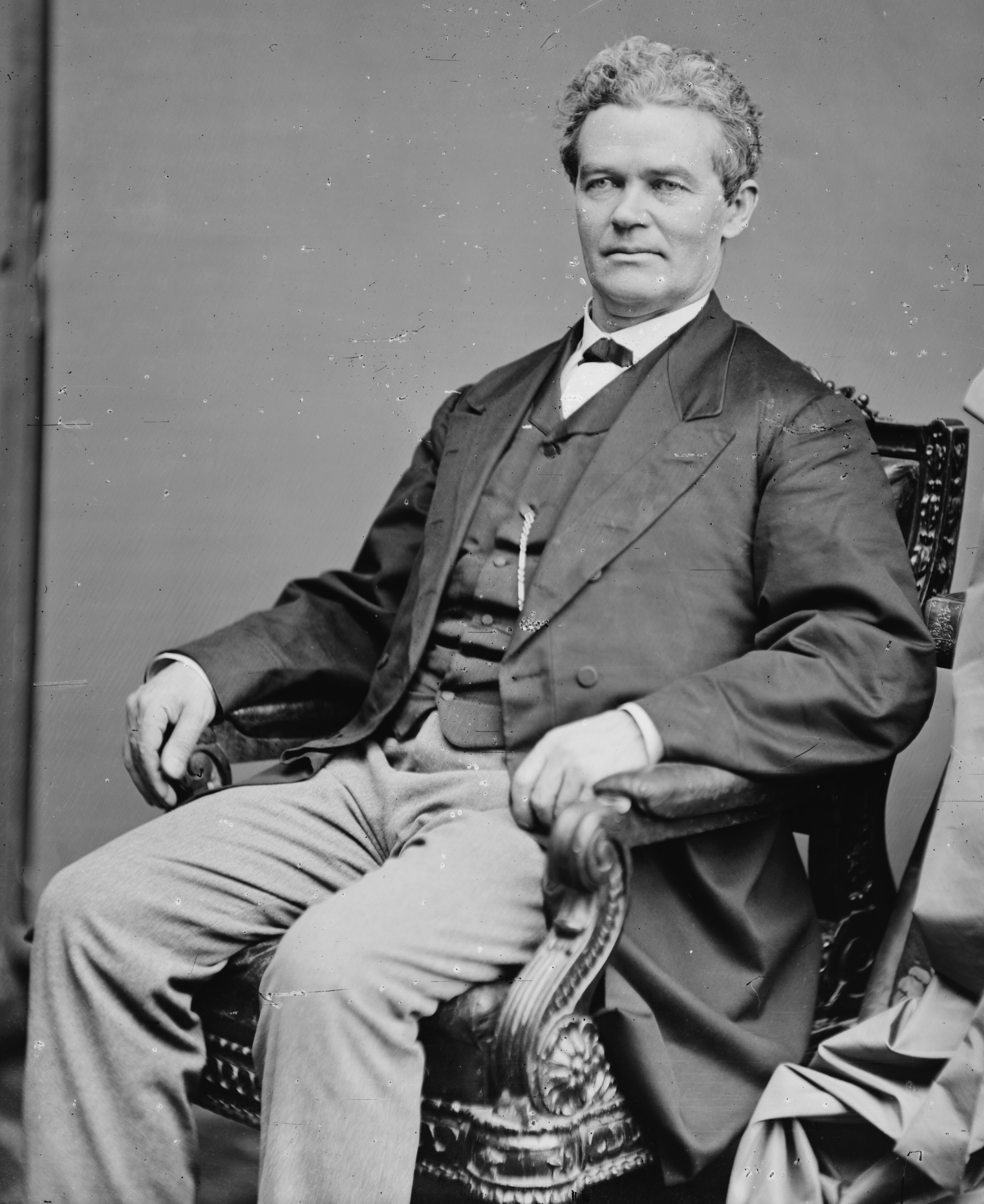
Portrait by Brady c. 1863–1869

A Douglas Democrat who later became a Union Republican while serving in the Senate, Conness earned President Abraham Lincoln's respect. The two men worked together on legislation Conness introduced to protect Yosemite National Park and Mariposa Grove. In addition, Conness gave support to Lincoln's war measures. Lincoln once said of Conness that he "is habitually careful not to say what he does not know," and described him on another occasion as "one of our United States Senators, of high standing, whom I cheerfully endorse."

Conness was with his Senate colleagues William M. Stewart of Nevada and Charles Sumner of Massachusetts the night Lincoln was assassinated. "Upon hearing of the attack on Secretary of State William H. Seward, the three men ran to Seward's lodgings. There they were turned away by a doctor who was attending to Seward, and they ran to the White House, where they heard the news that Lincoln had been shot. Conness declared that 'this is a conspiracy to murder the entire cabinet' and directed soldiers to go protect Secretary of War Edwin Stanton." Conness had the honor of being a pallbearer at Lincoln's funeral on April 19, 1865.

At the beginning of Reconstruction, Conness alienated some of his California constituents by advocating strongly for Chinese immigration and civil rights. At a time of rising anti-Chinese feelings in California, his was an unusual and unpopular view, and he lost the support of his party. He strongly believed in justice for all immigrants.

In the Senate debate on the 14th Amendment, Conness said, “We are entirely ready to accept the provision proposed in this constitutional amendment, that the children born here of Mongolian [Chinese] parents shall be declared by the Constitution of the United States to be entitled to civil rights and to equal protection before the law with others."

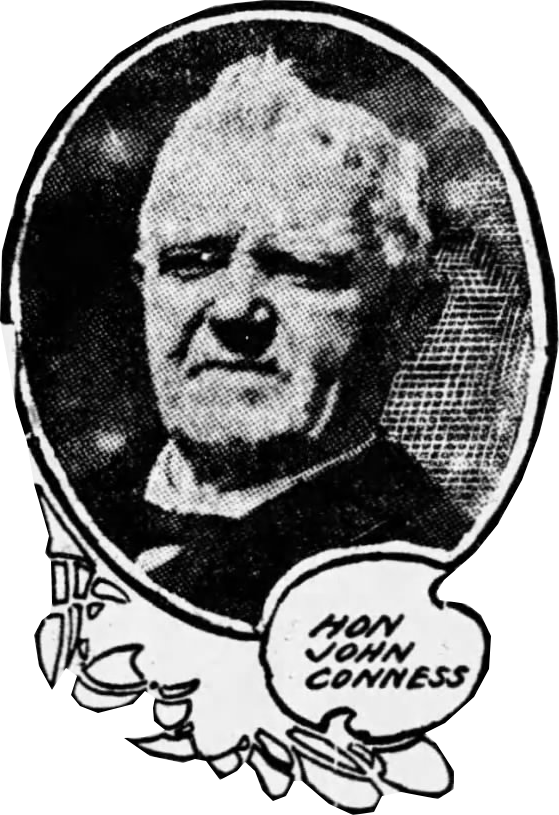
Conness c. 1909

After his Senate term ended in 1869, Conness relocated to Boston, Massachusetts, a center of Irish-American life. He lived there the remainder of his life, for nearly four decades. He died in an insane asylum in Jamaica Plain, now part of Boston. He was buried in Cedar Grove Cemetery in Dorchester, Boston.

== Legacy and honors ==
- Conness supported the federal land grants for Yosemite Valley and Mariposa Grove, founding what later became the Yosemite National Park.
- Mount Conness and Conness Creek in the Sierra Nevada were named in his honor.
- Conness voted for the amendments to abolish slavery and grant freedmen citizenship.
- He supported immigration and civil rights for Chinese in California.
- Last surviving pallbearer of Abraham Lincoln.

== See also ==
- List of United States senators born outside the United States

== Notes ==
Party political offices
| Preceded by John Currey | Democratic nominee for Governor of California; 1861 | Succeeded by John G. Downey |
U.S. Senate
| Preceded by Milton S. Latham | U.S. senator (Class 1) from California; March 4, 1863 – March 3, 1869; Served alongside: James A. McDougall, Cornelius Cole | Succeeded by Eugene Casserly |
Honorary titles
| Preceded by Edmund Pettus | Oldest living U.S. senator July 27, 1907 – January 10, 1909 | Succeeded by Cornelius Cole |
