= Alaska Commercial Company =

American retail and grocery company

- Type: Subsidiary
- Industry: Retail / Grocery
- Predecessor: Russian-American Company
- Founded: 1867 (159 years ago)
- Number of locations: 33
- Area served: Alaska
- Services: Supermarket
- Parent: The North West Company (1992–present)
- Website: alaskacommercial.com

Alaska Commercial Company (ACC) is a grocery and retail company which operates stores in rural Alaska, beginning in the early period of Alaska's ownership by the United States into the present. From 1901 to 1992, it was known as the Northern Commercial Company (NCC), and in 1992 it resumed business as the Alaska Commercial Company under the ownership of the North West Company.

== History ==
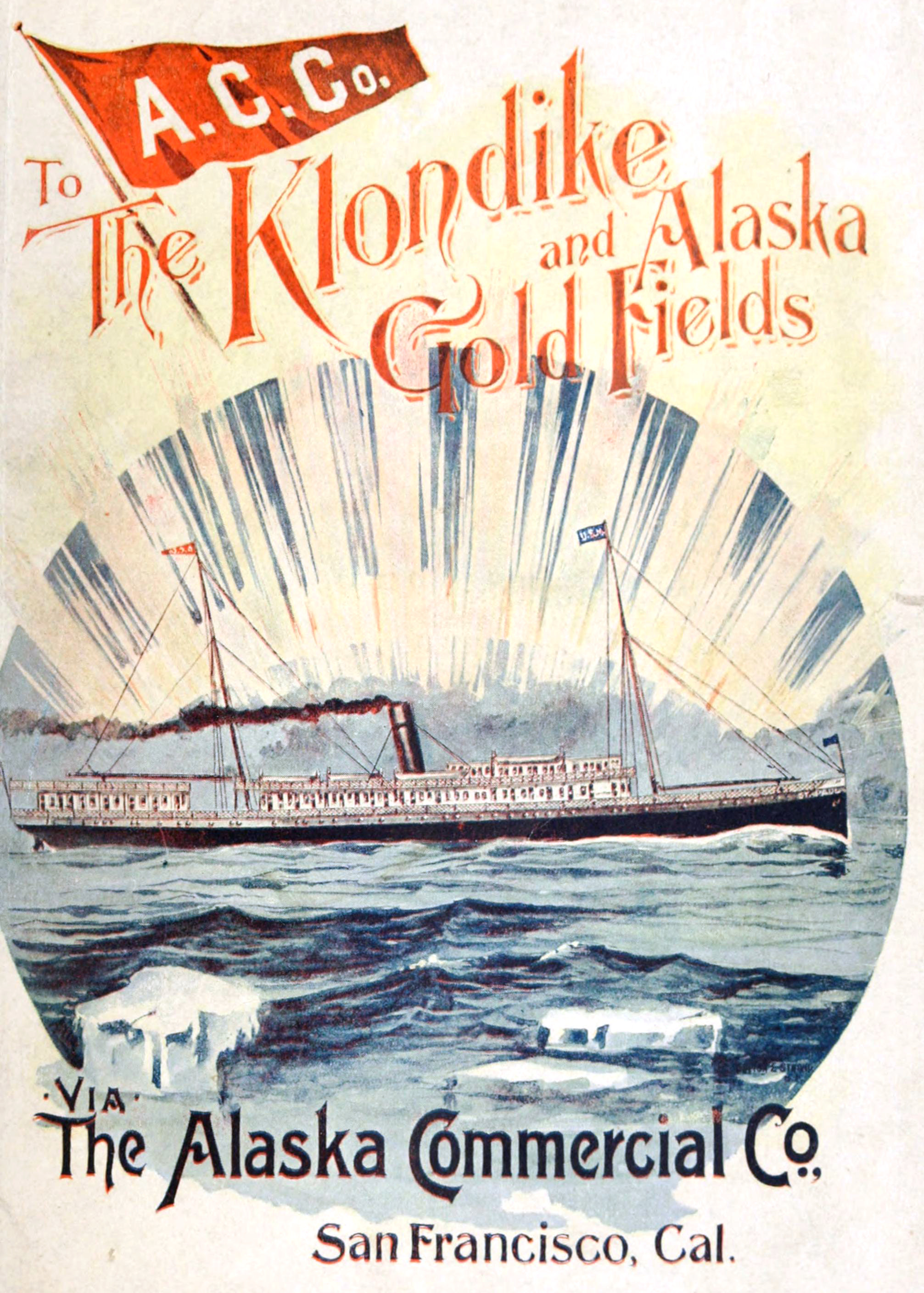
Cover of an 1898 advertising guidebook issued by the Alaska Commercial Company for those travelling north as part of the Klondike Gold Rush

House flag of Alaska Commercial Company

After the 1867 purchase of Alaska by the United States, the firm of Hutchison, Kohl & Company, including Hayward Hutchison, William Kohl, and Louis Sloss, bought the Russian-American Company. In 1868, Sloss, Lewis Gerstle, and August Wassermann bought this company, although Hutchison, Kohl & Company was in simultaneous existence and under the same ownership until 1872, when the new company paid off the purchase. This new company, formed in 1868, was called the Alaska Commercial Company, and did business under this name until 1901. In that year, because of increasing competition in the sealskin trade, the Alaska Commercial Company merged with the International Mercantile Marine Company and Alaska Goldfields, Ltd., to form two new companies, the Northern Navigation Company and the Northern Commercial Company. The original owners of the Alaska Commercial Company, Louis Sloss, Gerstle, etc. carried on the business under the name of the Northern Commercial Company. Shortly afterwards, W.J. Erskine bought some of the old Alaska Commercial Company boats and set up a small successor to the Company in certain areas of Alaska.

The Northern Commercial Company operated village stores in Alaska from 1868 to 1922, a period which included the Klondike Gold Rush (1897–1899). The stores often served as the village courthouse and post office as well. Much trade in the stores was bartered, as few people had cash. The stores accepted such items as gold, fish and furs in exchange for merchandise. The stores were often the nucleus of small communities and communities often grew because of the stores.

In 1922, the Northern Commercial Company was sold to a group of employees, who moved the headquarters to Seattle. It opened department stores, auto dealerships, and tire stores in Alaska's cities, and became a major supplier of heavy equipment and machinery in Alaska. By 1975 the Northern Commercial Company sold its department stores to Nordstrom. The Goodyear tire stores were sold to Bandag. In 1977 the old name, the Alaska Commercial Company (ACC) was reintroduced to the stores and the remaining eleven rural stores were sold to the Community Enterprise Development Corporation (CEDC) of Alaska . In November 1992, the CEDC sold the stores in turn to The North West Company, a Canadian retailer mainly serving northern communities. ACC now has 33 stores in 30 remote Alaska Villages. Northern Commercial retained the heavy equipment division, which continues to operate under the name NC Machinery.

== See also ==
- Maritime fur trade
