= Warren Olney Jr. =

American judge (1870–1939)

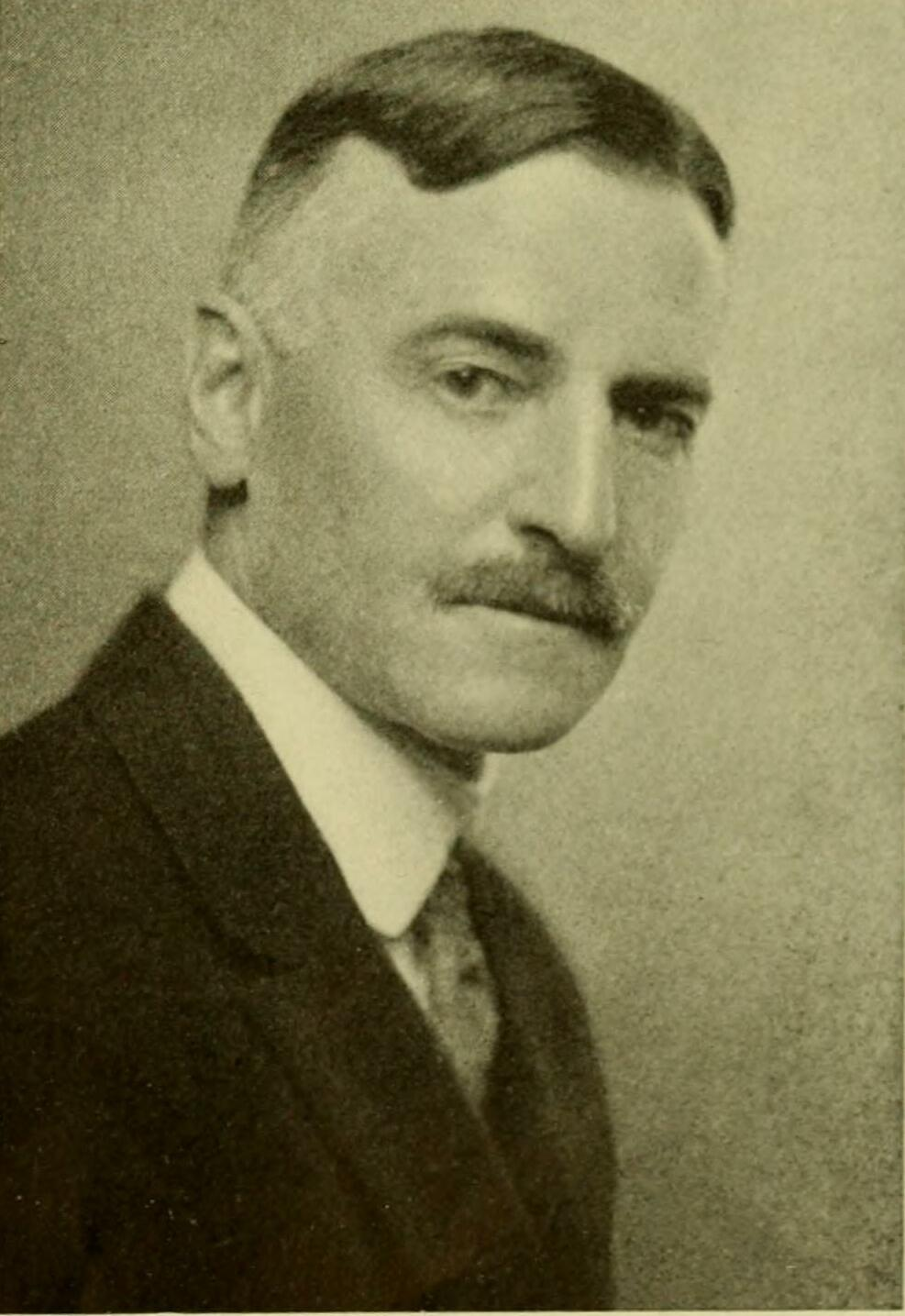

Associate Justice of the Supreme Court of California
- In office March 1, 1919 – July 1921
- Appointed by: Governor William Stephens
- Preceded by: M. C. Sloss
- Succeeded by: Charles A. Shurtleff

Personal details
- Born: October 15, 1870 San Francisco, California, U.S.
- Died: March 25, 1939 (aged 68) Berkeley, California, U.S.
- Spouse: Mary M. McLean (m. 1899)
- Education: University of California, Berkeley (AB); Harvard University (AB); University of California, Hastings College of the Law (LLB)

Warren Olney Jr. (October 15, 1870 – March 25, 1939) was an American lawyer who served as an associate justice of the Supreme Court of California from March 1, 1919, to July 1921.

== Early life and education ==
Olney was the second of six children born to Mary Jane Craven (January 30, 1842 – 1928) and Warren Olney Sr. (March 11, 1841 – June 2, 1921), an attorney in San Francisco. Olney Sr. co-founded the Sierra Club in his law office with naturalist John Muir, and others, but was later expelled from the organization because he supported the flooding of Hetch Hetchy Valley to supply water to San Francisco. Olney Sr. was mayor of Oakland, California from 1903 to 1905.

Olney Jr. was educated in the public schools in Oakland. In 1891, he was graduated with an A.B. at the University of California, Berkeley, where he played on the football team. He then studied at Harvard for a postgraduate year, receiving an A.B. in 1892, and returned to San Francisco. In 1894, Olney received his LL.B. degree from the University of California, Hastings College of Law, and was admitted to the bar.

== Legal and judicial career ==
Olney entered into practice with his father in Olney & Olney, and then Olney, Pringle & Mannon. He also from 1895 to 1904 taught law classes at Hastings and when Berkeley opened its law school he lectured on evidence there from 1904 to 1907.

In 1907, he joined the firm of Page, McCutchen, Knight and Olney, later known as McCutchen, Olney, and Willard (1913-1919). His clients included Western Pacific Railroad. From 1911 to 1919, he was counsel for the regents of the University of California. Beginning July 1, 1932, he served as president of the alumni association for two years, and thus sat as a regent.

Olney was appointed Associate Justice of the California Supreme Court by Governor William Stephens, and served from March 1919 to July 1921. In November 1920, he was re-elected but left the court after a time to resume private practice with McCutchen, Olney, Mannon, and Greene (1921-1939)(later known as McCutchen, Doyle, Brown & Enersen and then Bingham McCutchen, until its collapse in 2014).

In 1930 to 1932, he was a special assistant to the Attorney General of the United States in antitrust litigation concerning the Radio Corporation of America.

== Bar and civic activities ==
In 1917, Olney had charge of registration in California for the draft for World War I. He served the Bar Association of San Francisco as president from 1926 to 1927, as his father had from 1901 to 1902. From 1935 to 1937, he was a member of the U.S. Supreme Court's advisory committee on rules of civil procedure for U.S. District Courts.

== Personal life ==
In 1899 he married Mary M. McLean (July 25, 1873 – August 12, 1965) of Alameda, California, who graduated from the University of California and taught at Stanford and Pomona College. They had two sons and a daughter: John McLean Olney, Warren Olney III, and Constance S. Olney.

The youngest son, Warren Olney III (February 25, 1904 – December 23, 1978), became an attorney and practiced in his father's law firm. He was appointed by President Dwight D. Eisenhower as an Assistant Attorney General to oversee the Criminal Division of the United States Department of Justice. From 1956 to 1966, Warren III was Director of the Administrative Office of the United States Courts. He was appointed by Chief Justice Earl Warren, whom Warren III had served under in the California Attorney General's Office. His son, Warren Olney IV, is a broadcast journalist in Los Angeles.

== See also ==
- List of justices of the Supreme Court of California

Political offices
Preceded by M. C. Sloss	Associate Justice of the California Supreme Court; 1919–1921	Succeeded by Charles A. Shurtleff
