= Bar Association of San Francisco =

Bar Association

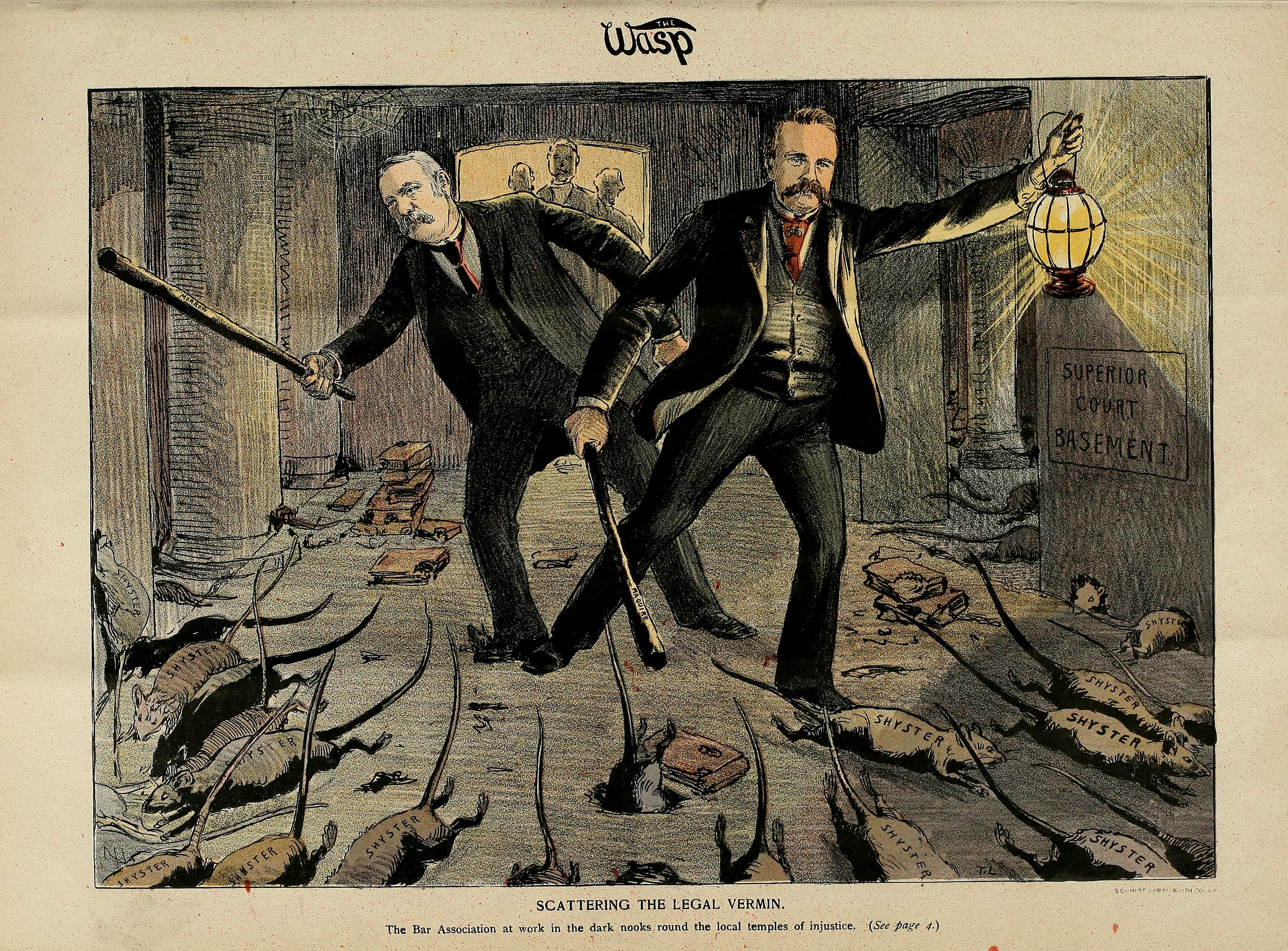
"Scattering The Legal Vermin," a political cartoon published in The Wasp depicting the efforts of Bar Association members William W. Morrow and James G. Maguire to rid the San Francisco Superior Court of "shysters," February 11, 1893

The Bar Association of San Francisco (BASF) was established in 1872 as a nonprofit legal membership organization that provides San Francisco legal professionals with networking, educational and pro bono opportunities in order to better serve the community.

BASF is located at 201 Mission Street in San Francisco. Prior to April 2021, BASF was located in the financial district at 301 Battery Street, between Sacramento and Clay Streets, on the third floor of the Bently Reserve building. Included in the National Register of Historic Places, the Bently Reserve, formerly the Federal Reserve Bank of San Francisco, was built in 1924.

== Structure ==
The first three presidents of BASF: J. P. Hoge, W. W. Cope, and S. M. Wilson

BASF is governed by an elected Board of Directors. In addition, BASF currently has 27 sections and six committees, each dedicated to either a particular, substantive area of the law or to issues such as access to justice and the administration of justice.

BASF's Barristers Club, the division serving attorneys with under ten years of experience, has its own board of directors.

== Marriage Fairness Task Force ==
In 2008 BASF organized a Marriage Fairness Task Force to respond to what it believes are the attempts being made to attack the Supreme Court and to rewrite the California constitution and deny Californians the marriage rights currently protected by the constitution as interpreted by the Supreme Court.

== Community programs ==
BASF founded the Volunteer Legal Services Program (VLSP) (now the Justice & Diversity Center) in 1977. It began as a small pro bono project, but is now one of the largest nonprofit providers of free legal and social services to low income individuals and families.

The work of the Justice & Diversity Center (JDC) is focused through three programs: Pro Bono Legal Services, the Homeless Advocacy Project, and the Diversity Educational Programs.

The Homeless Advocacy Project (HAP), founded in 1988, is JDC's largest program. The Homeless Advocacy Project (HAP) provides free legal and related social services to individuals and families who are homeless or at serious risk of becoming homeless. The most common legal issues addressed at HAP are federal disability benefits advocacy, eviction defense and immigration documentation.

JDC's Diversity Educational Programs are provided in partnership with BASF to increase the diversity of the legal profession. The programs are designed to inspire minority students to pursue a career in law by removing barriers to college and law school attendance. For minority law school students, JDC offers three-year scholarships to Bay Area law schools as well as mentoring and networking opportunities.

Finally, BASF also established the Lawyer Referral and Information Service(LRIS) in 1947. LRIS offers legal assistance to clients from a panel of experienced lawyers.
