= Casserly =

Casserly is a surname. Notable people with the surname include:

- Charley Casserly, American football executive
- Eugene Casserly, Irish-American politician
- James R. Casserly, American politician and lawyer
- Luke Casserly, Australian footballer
- Michael Casserly, Irish sportsperson
- Peter Casserly, Australian military personnel
- Patrick S. Casserly, Irish editor and writer
