= 1887 United States Senate election in California =

- January 20, 1887

Majority vote of both houses needed to win
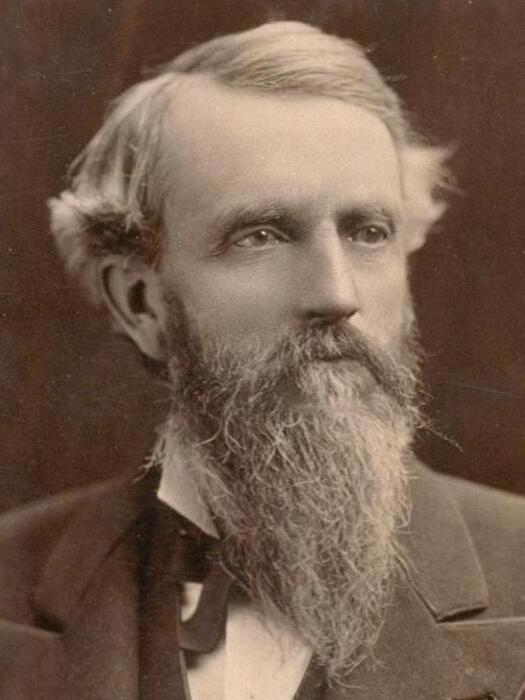

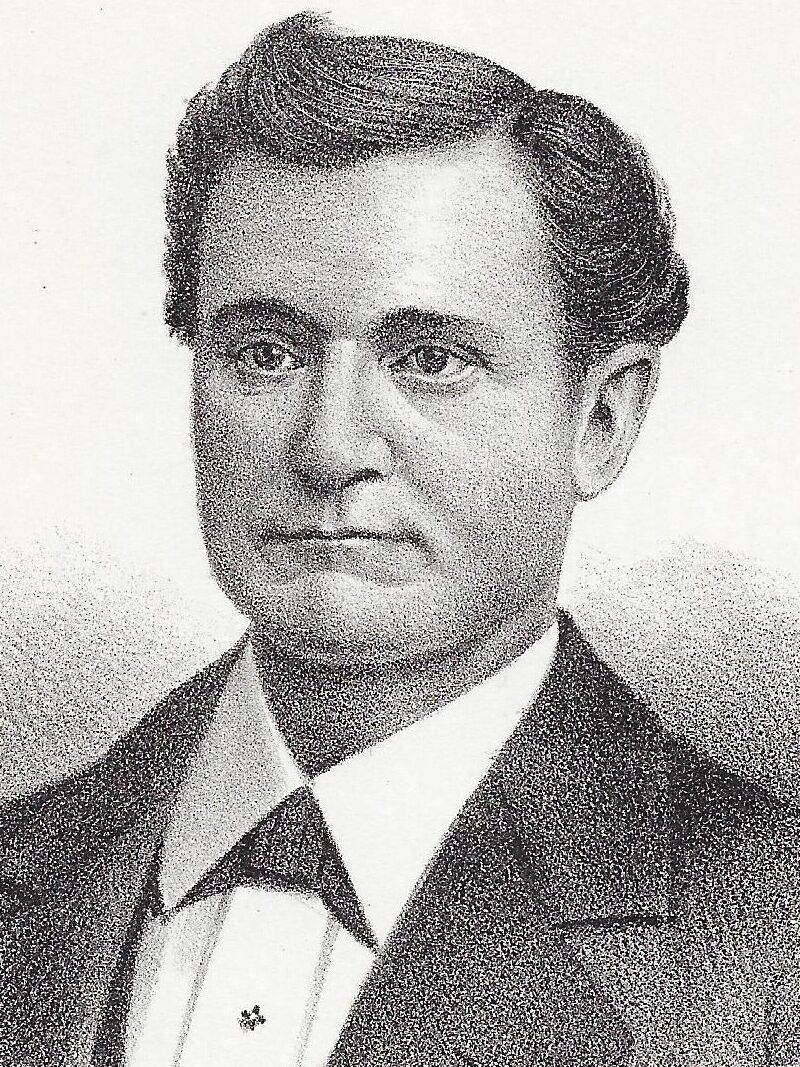
Nominee	George Hearst	Henry Vrooman
Party	Democratic	Republican
Joint session	63	53
Percentage	53.85%	45.30%
Senator before election
Abram Williams
Republican
Elected Senator
George Hearst
Democratic

The 1887 United States Senate election in California was held on January 20, 1887, by the California State Legislature to elect a U.S. senator (Class 1) to represent the State of California in the United States Senate. In a special joint session, former Democratic Senator George Hearst was elected over Republican State Senator Henry Vrooman.

== Results ==
Election in the Legislature (joint session)
Party	Candidate	Votes	%
Democratic	George Hearst	63	53.85%
Republican	Henry Vrooman	53	45.30%
	Scattering	1	0.85%
Total votes		117	100.00%
