= Casserley =

Casserley is a surname. Notable people with the surname include:

- H. C. Casserley (1903–1991), British railway photographer
- Lawrence Casserley (born 1941), British composer, conductor, and performer
- Rob Casserley, British surgeon and mountaineer

== See also ==
- Casserly
