= 1873 United States Senate special election in California =

- December 23, 1873

Majority vote of both houses needed to win
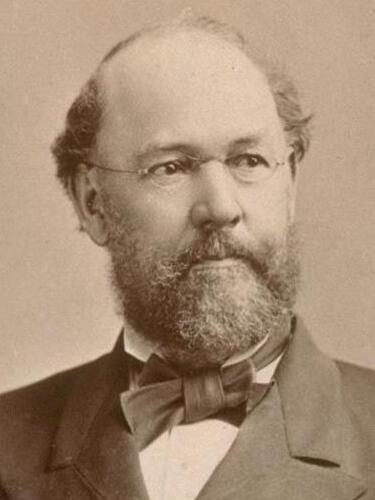

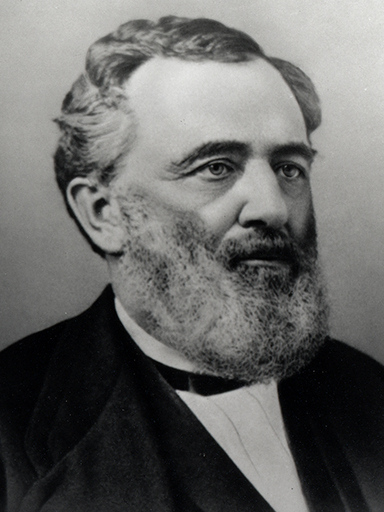

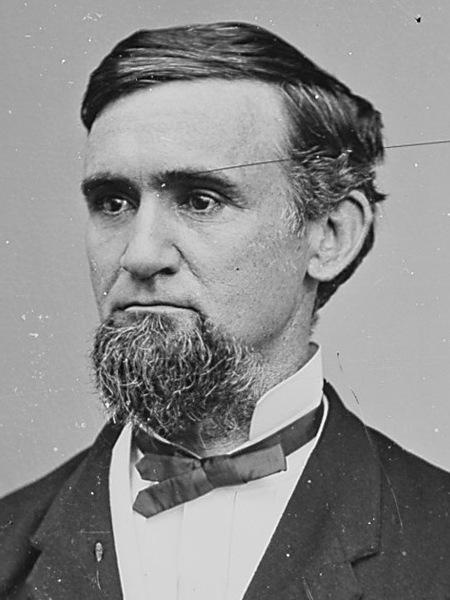
Nominee	John S. Hager	Thomas H. Laine
Party	Democratic	Independent
Joint session	55	20
Percentage	53.92%	19.61%
Nominee	Oscar L. Shafter	Cornelius Cole
Party	Republican	Republican
Joint session	13	8
Percentage	12.75%	7.84%
Senator before election
Eugene Casserly
Democratic
Elected Senator
John S. Hager
Democratic

The 1873 United States Senate special election in California was held on December 23, 1873, by the California State Legislature to elect a U.S. senator (Class 1) to represent the State of California in the United States Senate. In a special joint session, Democratic State Senator John S. Hager was elected over People's Independent State Senator Thomas H. Laine, former Republican State Supreme Court Justice Oscar L. Shafter, and former Republican U.S. Senator Cornelius Cole.

== Results ==
Election in the legislature (joint session)
Party	Candidate	Votes	%
Democratic	John S. Hager	55	53.92%
Independent	Thomas H. Laine	20	19.61%
Republican	Oscar L. Shafter	13	12.75%
Republican	Cornelius Cole	8	7.84%
	Scattering	6	5.88%
Total votes		102	100.00%
