= Orrin Williams =

Orrin Williams may refer to:

- Orrin J. Williams (1844–1913), American politician and businessman in Wisconsin
- Orrin T. Williams (1845–1928), American judge, lawyer, and politician in Wisconsin
