= Short ton =

Unit of mass

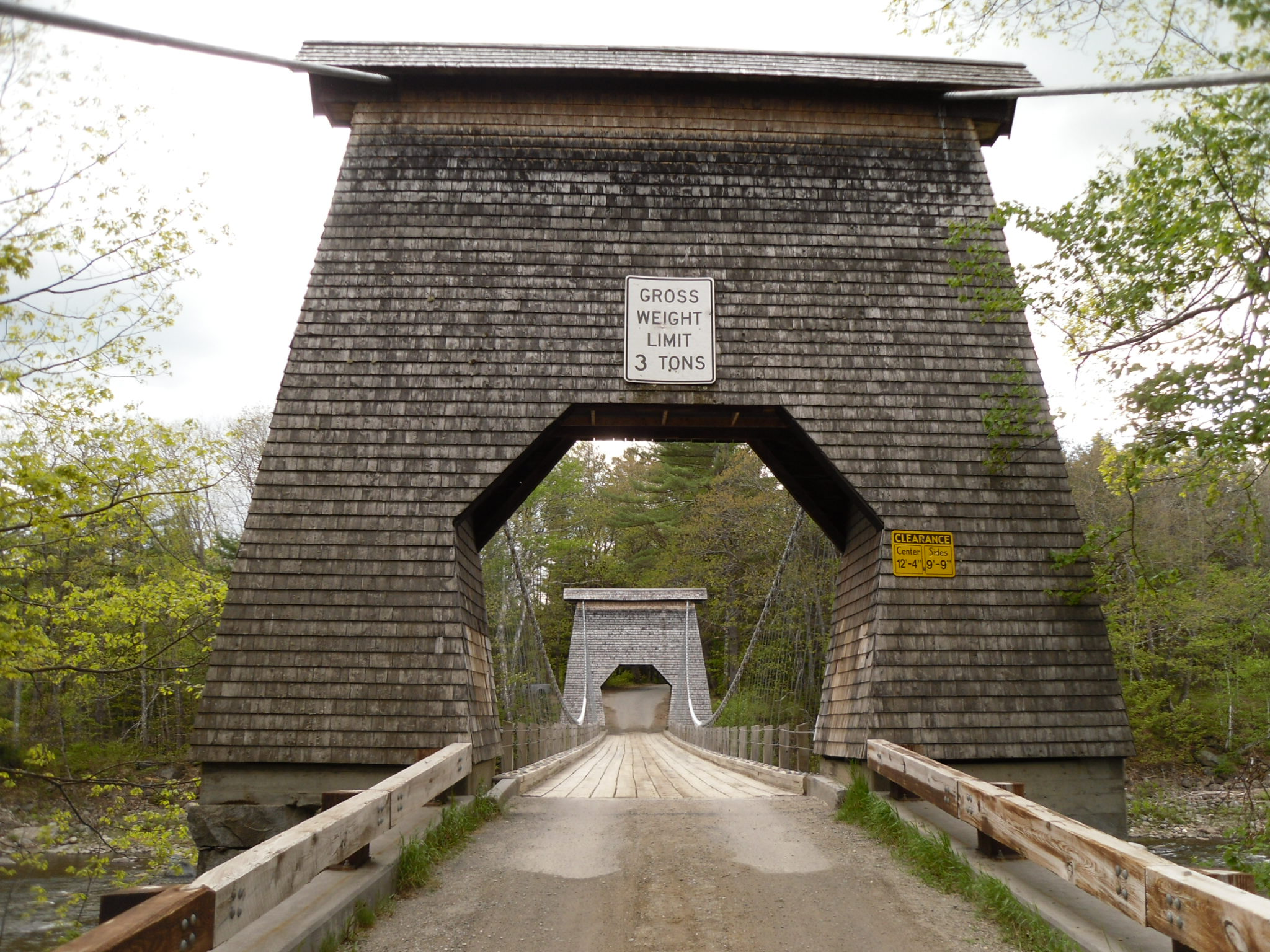
- The Wire Bridge in New Portland, Maine, United States, with a 3-ton gross weight limit. The short ton is primarily used in the US.

General information
- Unit system: United States customary units
- Unit of: Mass
- In base units: 2,000 lb

Conversions
1 short ton in ...	... is equal to ...
- SI base units: 907.18 kg
- Metric tons: 0.90718 t
- Long tons: 0.893 long tons

The short ton (abbreviation: tn or st), also known as the US ton, is a measurement unit equal to 2,000 pounds (907.18 kg). It is commonly used in the United States, where it is known simply as a ton; however, the term is ambiguous, the single word "ton" being variously used for short, long, and metric tons.

The various tons are defined as units of mass. They are sometimes used as units of weight, the force exerted by a mass at standard gravity (e.g., short ton-force). One short ton exerts a weight at one standard gravity of 2,000 pound-force (lbf).

== United States ==
In the United States, a short ton is usually known simply as a "ton", without distinguishing it from the tonne (1,000 kilograms or 2,204.62 pounds), known there as the "metric ton", or the long ton also known as the "imperial ton" (2,240 pounds or 1,016.05 kilograms). There are, however, some U.S. applications where unspecified tons normally mean long tons (for example, naval ships) or metric tons (world grain production figures).

Both the long and short ton are defined as 20 hundredweights, but a hundredweight is 100 pounds (45.36 kg) in the US system (short or net hundredweight) and 112 pounds (50.80 kg) in the imperial system (long or gross hundredweight).

A short ton–force is 2,000 pounds-force (8,896.44 N).

== See also ==
- Tonnage, volume measurement used in maritime shipping, originally based on 100 cubic feet (2.83168 m^{3}).
