= Thomas J. Turner =

American politician

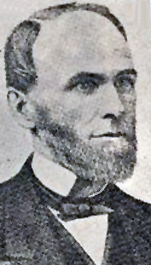

Member of the U.S. House of Representatives from Illinois's 6th district
- In office March 4, 1847 – March 3, 1849
- Preceded by: Joseph P. Hoge
- Succeeded by: Edward Dickinson Baker

Personal details
- Born: April 5, 1815 Trumbull County, Ohio
- Died: April 4, 1874 (aged 58) Hot Springs, Arkansas
- Party: Democratic

Thomas Johnston Turner (April 5, 1815 – April 4, 1874) was a U.S. representative from Illinois.

== Biography ==
Born in Trumbull County, Ohio, Turner completed preparatory studies. He moved with his parents to Butler County, Pennsylvania in 1825. He moved to Lake County, Indiana in 1837 and to Freeport, Illinois in 1838. He studied law. He was admitted to the bar in 1840 and commenced practice in Freeport. He served as judge of the probate court of Stephenson County in 1842, Postmaster of Freeport in 1844, and State district attorney in 1845. He established the first weekly newspaper (Prairie Democrat) in Stephenson County.

Turner was elected as a Democrat to the Thirtieth Congress (March 4, 1847 – March 3, 1849). He served as member of the Illinois House of Representatives in 1854; he was speaker. While speaker, Turner was a member of the Anti-Nebraska movement.

Turner was elected first mayor of Freeport, Illinois, in 1855. He served as delegate to the peace convention held in Washington, D.C. in 1861, in an effort to devise means to prevent the impending war. Turner enlisted in the Union Army May 24, 1861, and served as colonel of the Fifteenth Regiment, Illinois Volunteer Infantry. He resigned on account of ill health in 1862.

He served as member of the Illinois constitutional convention of 1863. He was an unsuccessful Democratic candidate for United States Senator in 1871. He moved to Chicago in 1871 and resumed the practice of law. He died in Hot Springs, Arkansas, April 4, 1874. He was interred in the City Cemetery, Freeport, Illinois.

U.S. House of Representatives
Preceded by Joseph P. Hoge	Member of the U.S. House of Representatives from Illinois's 6th congressional district 1847–1849	Succeeded by Edward D. Baker (W)
