= 1885 United States Senate election in California =

- January 28, 1885

Majority vote of both houses needed to win
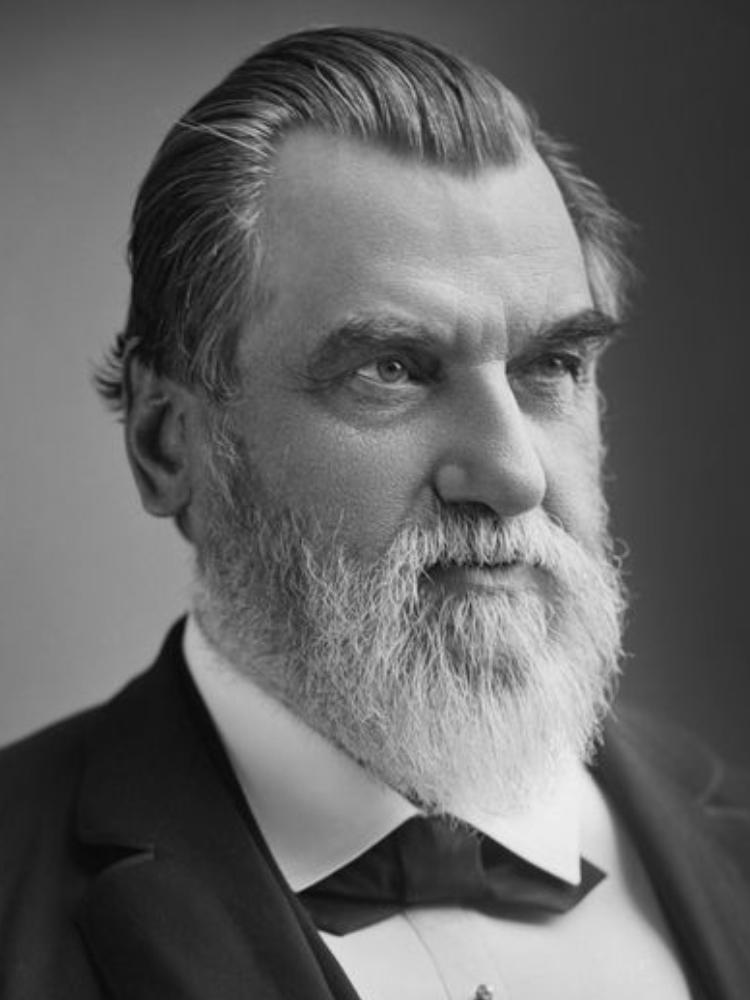

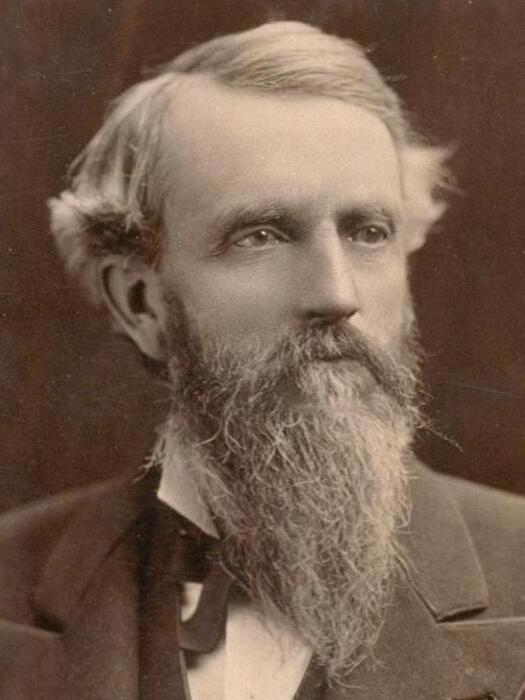
Nominee	Leland Stanford	George Hearst
Party	Republican	Democratic
Joint session	79	37
Percentage	66.39%	31.09%
Senator before election
James T. Farley
Democratic
Elected Senator
Leland Stanford
Republican

The 1885 United States Senate election in California was held on January 28, 1885, by the California State Legislature to elect a U.S. senator (Class 3) to represent the State of California in the United States Senate. In a special joint session, former Republican Governor Leland Stanford was elected over former Democratic State Assemblyman George Hearst.

== Results ==
Election in the Legislature (joint session)
Party	Candidate	Votes	%
Republican	Leland Stanford	79	66.39%
Democratic	George Hearst	37	31.09%
Democratic	James T. Farley	2	1.68%
Democratic	Niles Searls	1	0.84%
Total votes		119	100.00%
