= 1909 United States Senate election in California =

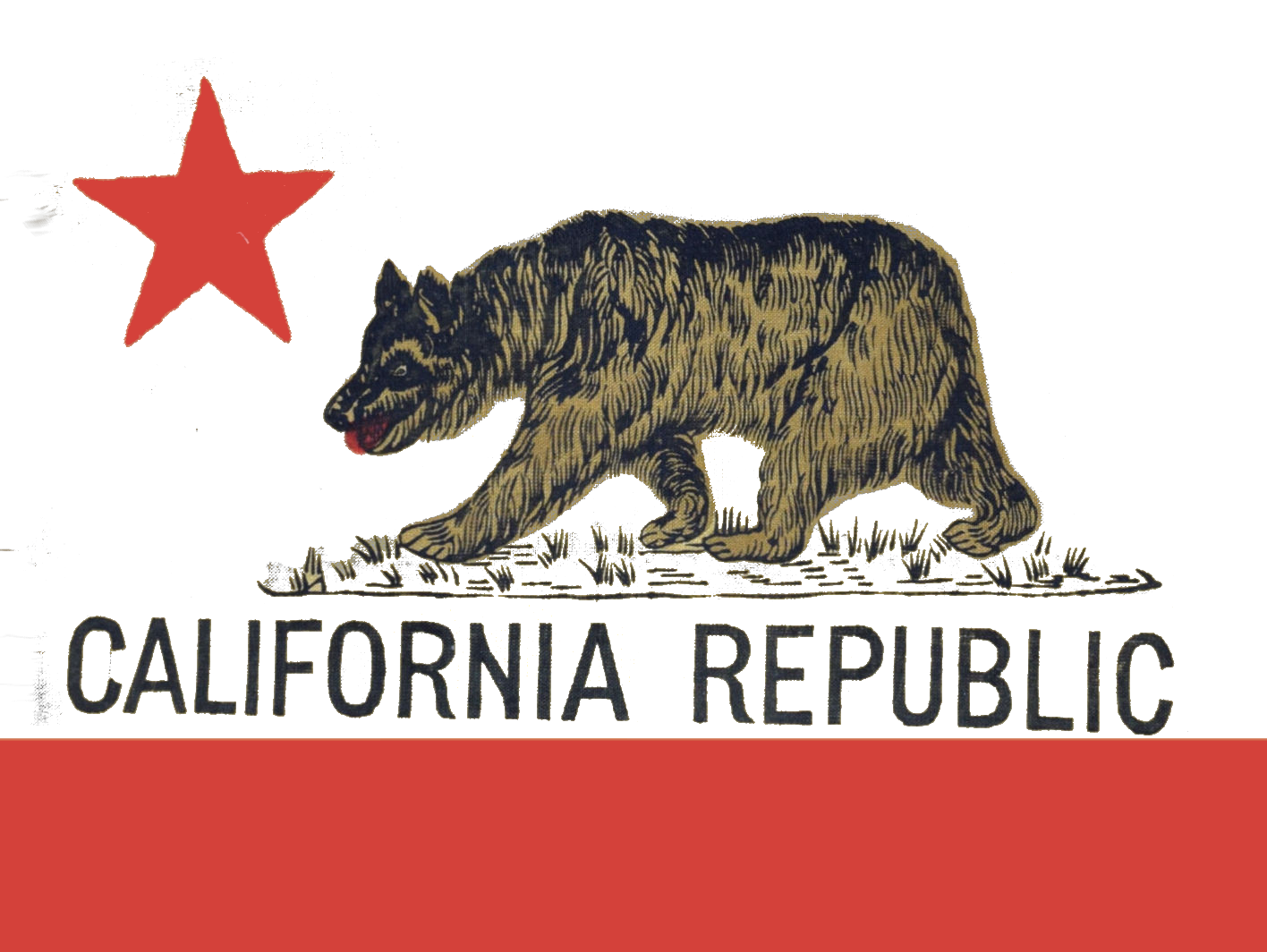
- January 12, 1909

Majority vote of each house needed to win
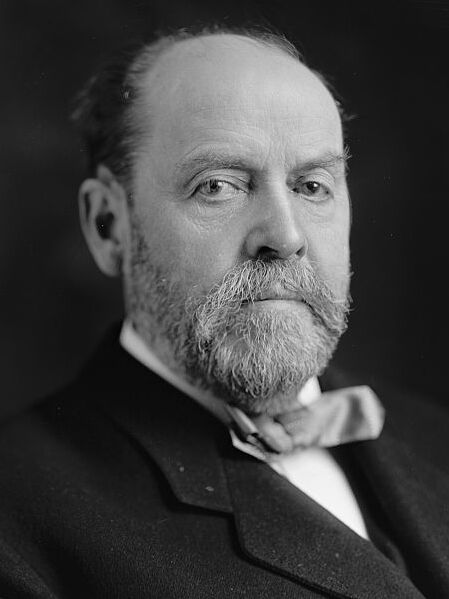

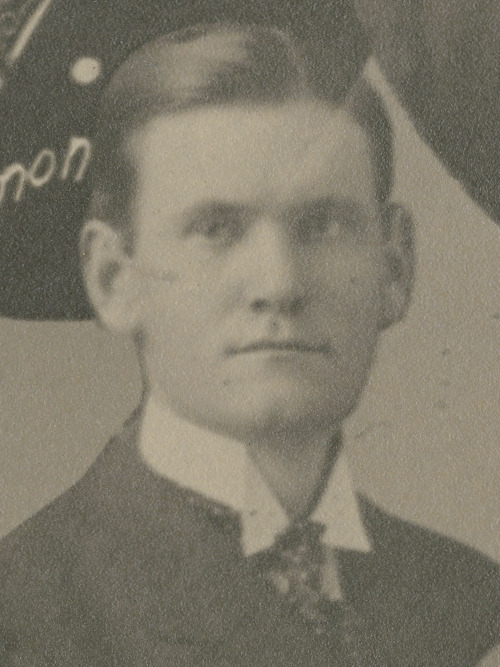

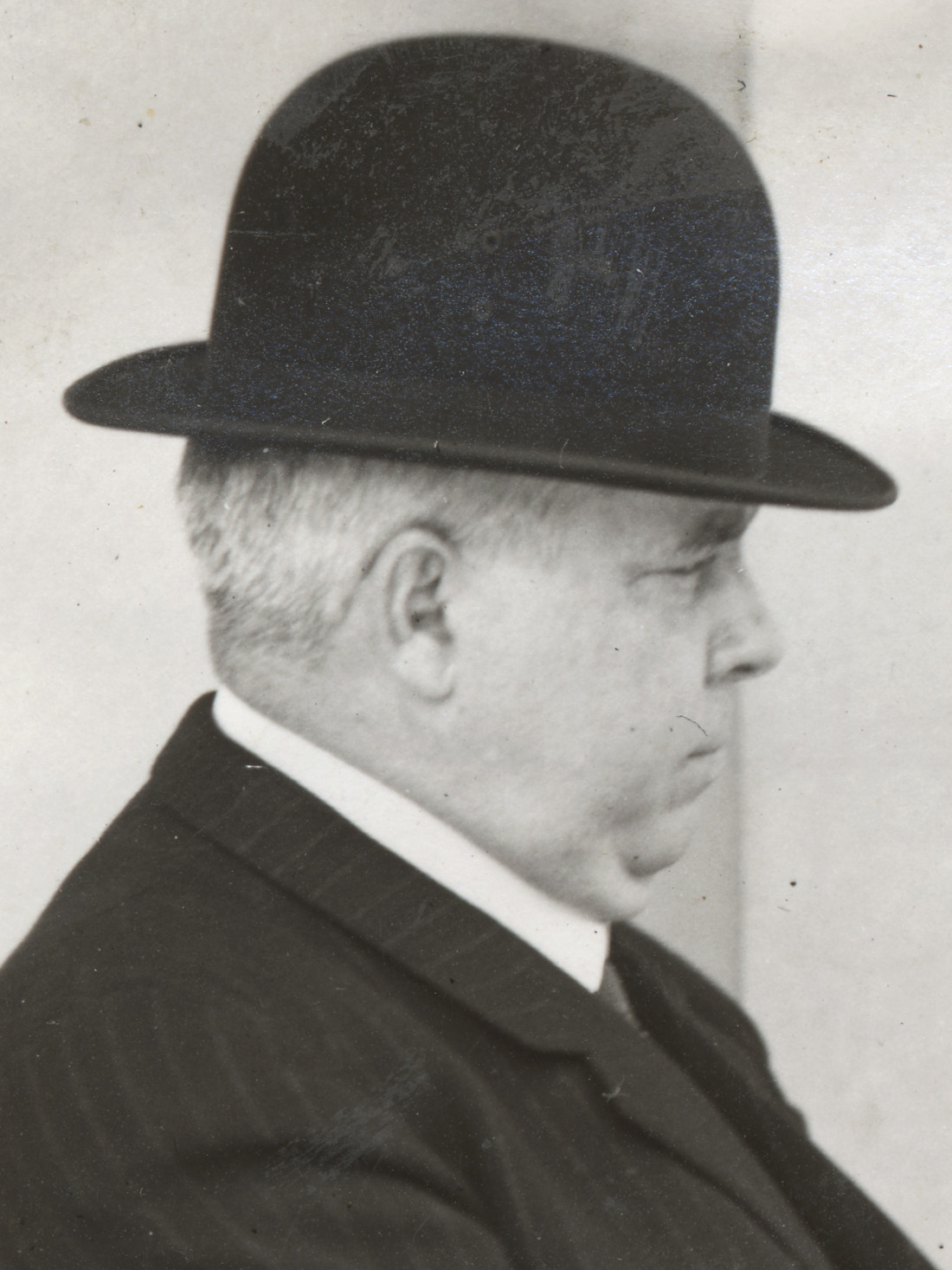
Nominee	George C. Perkins	John O. Davis	Harry Flannery
Party	Republican	Democratic	Democratic
Senate	32	6	1
Percentage	80.00%	15.00%	2.50%
House	56	13	6
Percentage	71.79%	16.67%	7.69%
Senator before election
George C. Perkins
Republican
Elected Senator
George C. Perkins
Republican

The 1909 United States Senate election in California was held on January 12, 1909, by the California State Legislature to elect a U.S. senator (Class 3) to represent the State of California in the United States Senate. Incumbent Republican Senator George Clement Perkins was re-elected to a fourth term in office with no serious opposition.

== Results ==
Election in the Senate
Party	Candidate	Votes	%
Republican	George C. Perkins (incumbent)	32	80.00%
Democratic	John O. Davis	6	15.00%
Democratic	Harry Flannery	1	2.50%
Independence	William Langdon	1	2.50%
Total votes		40	100.00%

Election in the Assembly
Party	Candidate	Votes	%
Republican	George C. Perkins (incumbent)	56	71.79%
Democratic	John O. Davis	13	16.67%
Democratic	Harry Flannery	6	7.69%
Republican	Thomas R. Bard	1	1.28%
Republican	Chester H. Rowell	1	1.28%
Democratic	Theodore A. Bell	1	1.28%
Total votes		78	100.00%
