= 1886 United States Senate special election in California =

- August 3, 1886

Majority vote of each house needed to win

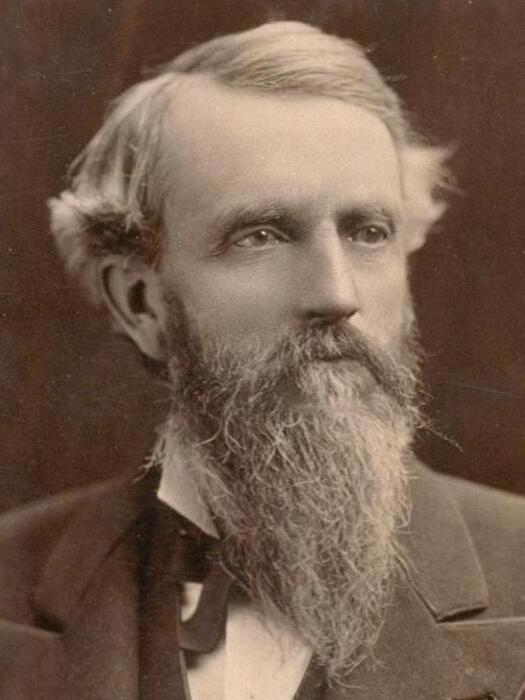
Nominee	Abram Williams	George Hearst
Party	Republican	Democratic
Senate	18	13
Percentage	58.06%	41.94%
House	52	11
Percentage	82.54%	17.46%
Senator before election
George Hearst
Democratic
Elected Senator
Abram Williams
Republican

The 1886 United States Senate special election in California was held on August 3, 1886, by the California State Legislature to elect a U.S. senator (Class 1) to represent the State of California in the United States Senate. Republican businessman Abram Williams was elected over incumbent Democratic Senator George Hearst.

== Results ==
Election in the Senate
Party	Candidate	Votes	%
Republican	Abram Williams	18	58.06%
Democratic	George Hearst	13	41.94%
Total votes		31	100.00%

Election in the Assembly
Party	Candidate	Votes	%
Republican	Abram Williams	52	82.54%
Democratic	George Hearst	11	17.46%
Total votes		63	100.00%
