= John S. Hager =

California politician (1818–1890)

John Sharpenstein Hager
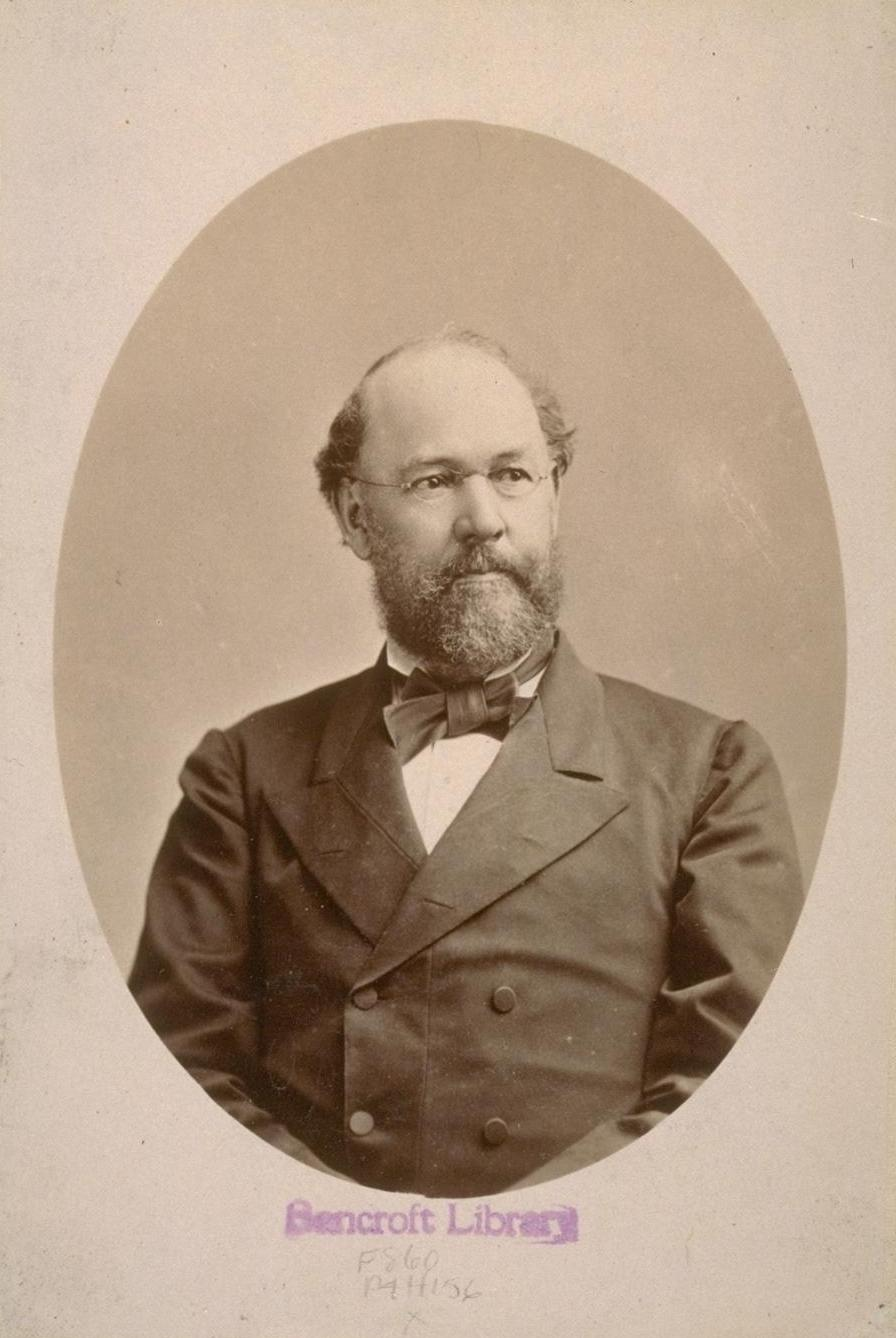
- Hager c. 1882

United States Senator from California
- In office December 23, 1873 – March 3, 1875
- Preceded by: Eugene Casserly
- Succeeded by: Newton Booth

Collector of the Port of San Francisco
- In office September 15, 1885 – April 17, 1889
- Appointed by: Grover Cleveland
- Preceded by: William H. Sears
- Succeeded by: Timothy Guy Phelps

Delegate to the Second Constitutional Convention of California
- In office September 28, 1878 – March 3, 1879
- Preceded by: Office established
- Succeeded by: Office abolished
- Constituency: 1st congressional district

Personal details
- Born: March 12, 1818 Morristown, New Jersey, U.S.
- Died: March 19, 1890 (aged 72) San Francisco, California, U.S.
- Party: Democratic

John Sharpenstein Hager (March 12, 1818 – March 19, 1890) was an American politician from New Jersey who represented the state of California in the U.S. Senate from 1873 to 1875. He was a Democrat.

== Early life ==
Hager was born near Morristown, New Jersey, on March 12, 1818. He completed preparatory studies and graduated from the College of New Jersey (later named Princeton University) in 1836. Hager studied law and was admitted to the bar in 1840, practicing in Morristown.

== Career ==
In 1849, Hager moved to California and engaged in mining during the California Gold Rush. He practiced law in San Francisco and was a member of the 1849 California Constitutional Convention. Hager served in the California Senate from 1852 to 1854, before being elected as a state district judge for the district of San Francisco in 1855. Hagar remained a district judge until 1861. In 1865, Hager returned to the state senate, serving until 1871, when he was elected a regent of the University of California

Copy of a speech Hager gave on the "Louisiana Case" and "racial equality"

Hager was elected to the U.S. Senate in 1873 as an Anti-Monopoly Democrat, filling the vacancy caused by the resignation of Eugene Casserly. He served from December 23, 1873, to March 4, 1875, and was not a candidate for renomination in 1874.

In 1879, Hager was a member of the state constitutional convention. He was collector of customs of the Port of San Francisco from 1885 to 1889. Hager died in San Francisco on March 19, 1890, one week after his 72nd birthday, and was interred at Bellefontaine Cemetery in St. Louis, Missouri.

== Sources ==
- United States Congress. "John S. Hager (id: H000016)". Biographical Directory of the United States Congress.
- Wilson, J. G.; Fiske, J., eds. (1892). "Hager, John Sharpenstien" . Appletons' Cyclopædia of American Biography. New York: D. Appleton.

U.S. Senate
Preceded by Eugene Casserly	U.S. senator (Class 1) from California; 1873–1875; Served alongside: Aaron A. Sargent	Succeeded by Newton Booth
