= 1891 United States Senate election in California =

- January 13, 1891

Majority vote of each house needed to win
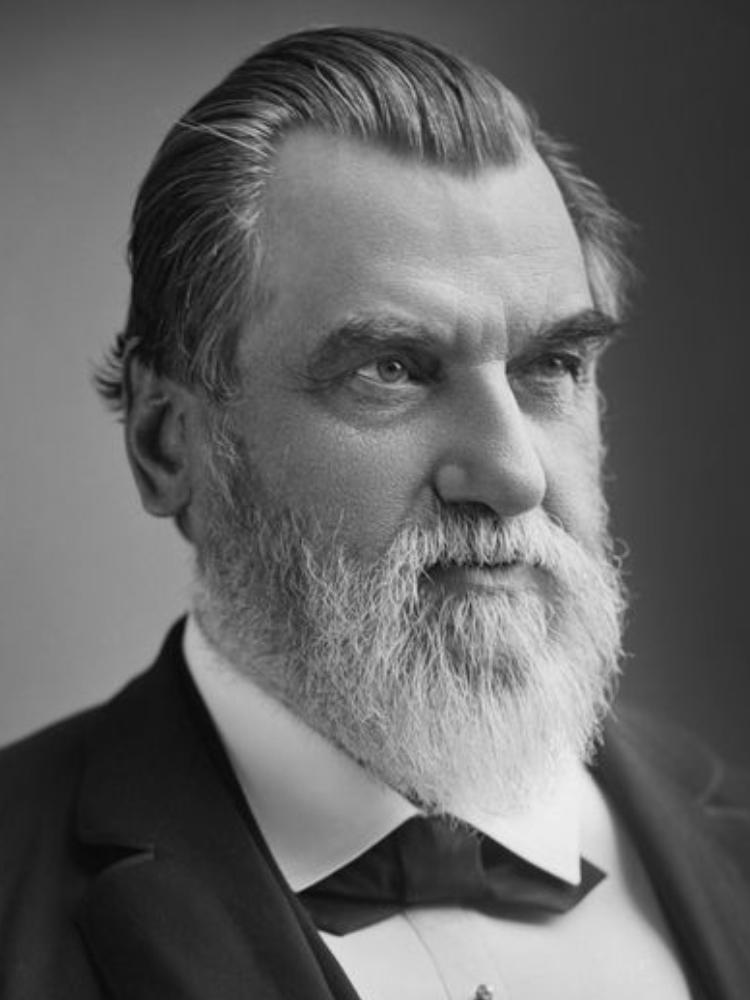

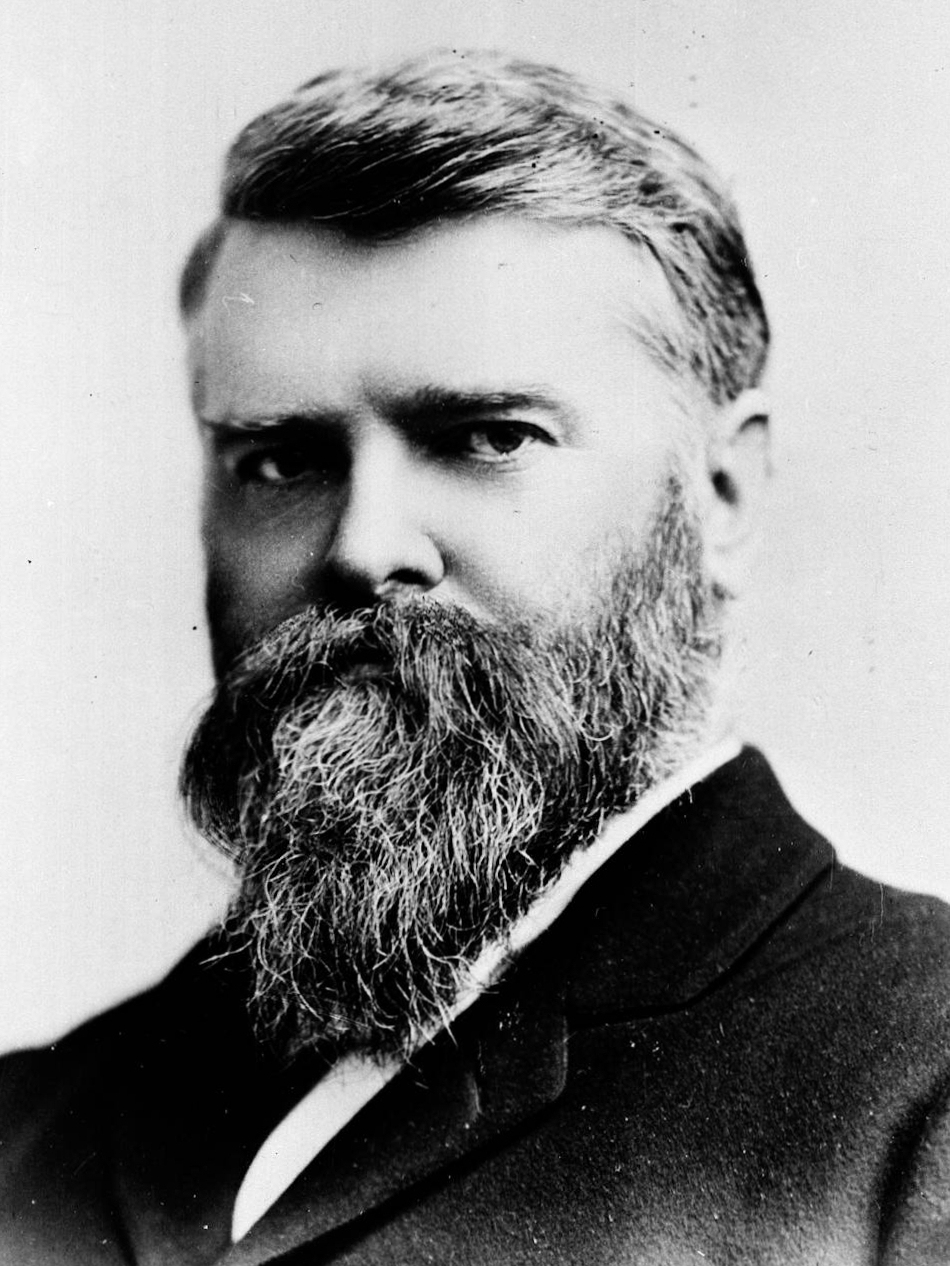
Nominee	Leland Stanford	Stephen M. White
Party	Republican	Democratic
Senate	27	12
Percentage	69.23%	30.77%
House	59	18
Percentage	75.64%	23.08%
Senator before election
Leland Stanford
Republican
Elected Senator
Leland Stanford
Republican

The 1891 United States Senate election in California was held on January 13, 1891, by the California State Legislature to elect a U.S. senator (Class 3) to represent the State of California in the United States Senate. Incumbent Republican Senator Leland Stanford was re-elected to a second term in office, defeating Democratic Lieutenant Governor Stephen M. White.

== Results ==
Election in the Senate
Party	Candidate	Votes	%
Republican	Leland Stanford (incumbent)	27	69.23%
Democratic	Stephen M. White	12	30.77%
Total votes		39	100.00%

Election in the Assembly
Party	Candidate	Votes	%
Republican	Leland Stanford (incumbent)	59	75.64%
Democratic	Stephen M. White	18	23.08%
Know Nothing	Ben Morgan	1	1.28%
Total votes		78	100.00%
