= Joseph P. Hoge =

American politician

Joseph Pendleton Hoge

Member of the U.S. House of Representatives from Illinois's 6th district
- In office March 4, 1843 – March 3, 1847
- Preceded by: District created
- Succeeded by: Thomas J. Turner

Delegate to the Second Constitutional Convention of California
- In office September 28, 1878 – March 3, 1879
- Preceded by: Office established
- Succeeded by: Office abolished
- Constituency: 1st congressional district

Judge of the San Francisco County Superior Court
- In office January 8, 1889 – August 14, 1891
- Preceded by: James G. Maguire
- Succeeded by: Charles W. Slack

Personal details
- Born: December 15, 1810 Steubenville, Ohio, U.S.
- Died: August 14, 1891 (aged 80) San Francisco, California, U.S.
- Party: Democratic

Joseph Pendleton Hoge (December 15, 1810 – August 14, 1891) was an American politician, lawyer, and judge. He was a member of the United States House of Representatives from Illinois.

== Biography ==
Born in Steubenville, Ohio, Hoge attended the common schools and graduated from Jefferson College (now Washington & Jefferson College). He studied law and was admitted to the bar in 1836. He moved to Galena 1836 and practiced law. He held several local offices.

With the help of the Mormon citizens of Nauvoo, who voted for him en masse, Hoge was elected by Illinois's 6th congressional district as a Democrat to the Twenty-eighth and Twenty-ninth Congresses (from March 4, 1843 to March 3, 1847). He was not a candidate for renomination in 1846. He resumed the practice of law in Galena.

Hoge moved to California in 1853 and continued the practice of law. He was an unsuccessful candidate for election to the United States Senate in 1867. He served as president of the state constitutional convention in 1878 and the board of freeholders in 1880. He served as judge of the San Francisco County Superior Court from January 1, 1889, until his death in the city on August 14, 1891.

He was interred in Laurel Hill Cemetery in San Francisco, California.

U.S. House of Representatives
Preceded by New District	Member of the U.S. House of Representatives from Illinois's 6th congressional district 1843–1847	Succeeded by Thomas J. Turner (D)
