= 1867 United States Senate election in California =

- December 20, 1867

Majority vote of both houses needed to win
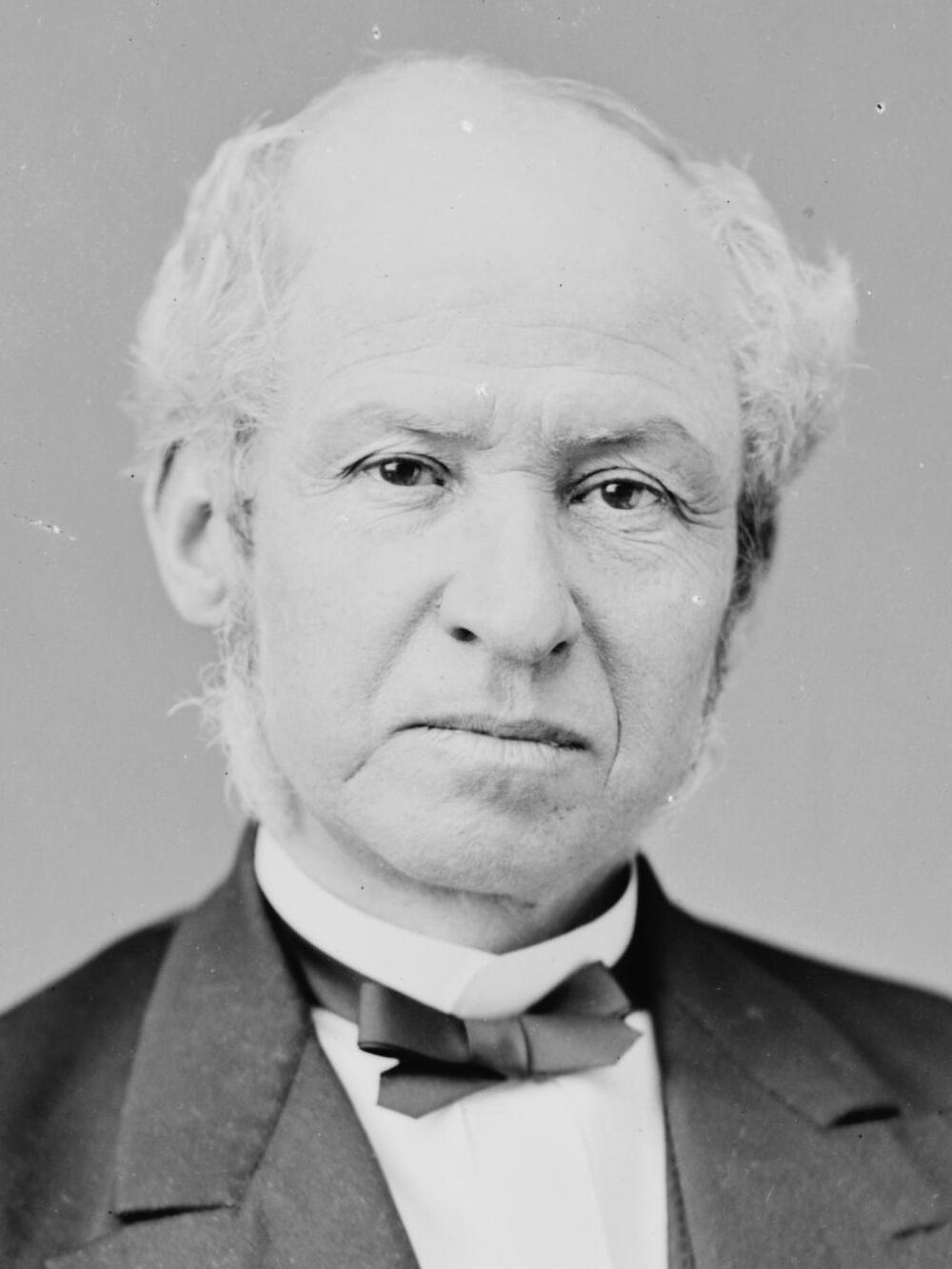

| Nominee | Eugene Casserly | Joseph P. Hoge |
| Party | Democratic | Democratic |
| Joint session | 44 | 23 |
| Percentage | 64.71% | 33.82% |
Senator before election
John Conness
Republican
Elected Senator
Eugene Casserly
Democratic

The 1867 United States Senate election in California was held on December 20, 1867, by the California State Legislature to elect a U.S. senator (Class 1) to represent the State of California in the United States Senate. In a special joint session, former Democratic State Printer Eugene Casserly was elected over fellow Democratic former Congressman from Illinois Joseph P. Hoge. Casserly and Hoge opposed each other over a dispute regarding an alleged deal that Hoge would let Casserly's protege Henry Huntly Haight run for Governor in exchange for Casserly backing Hoge for Senator.

== Results ==
Election in the legislature (joint session)
| Party | Candidate | Votes | % |
|---|---|---|---|
| Democratic | Eugene Casserly | 44 | 64.71% |
| Democratic | Joseph P. Hoge | 23 | 33.82% |
| | Scattering | 1 | 1.47% |
| Total votes | | 68 | 100.00% |
