= List of United States senators from California =

Current delegation

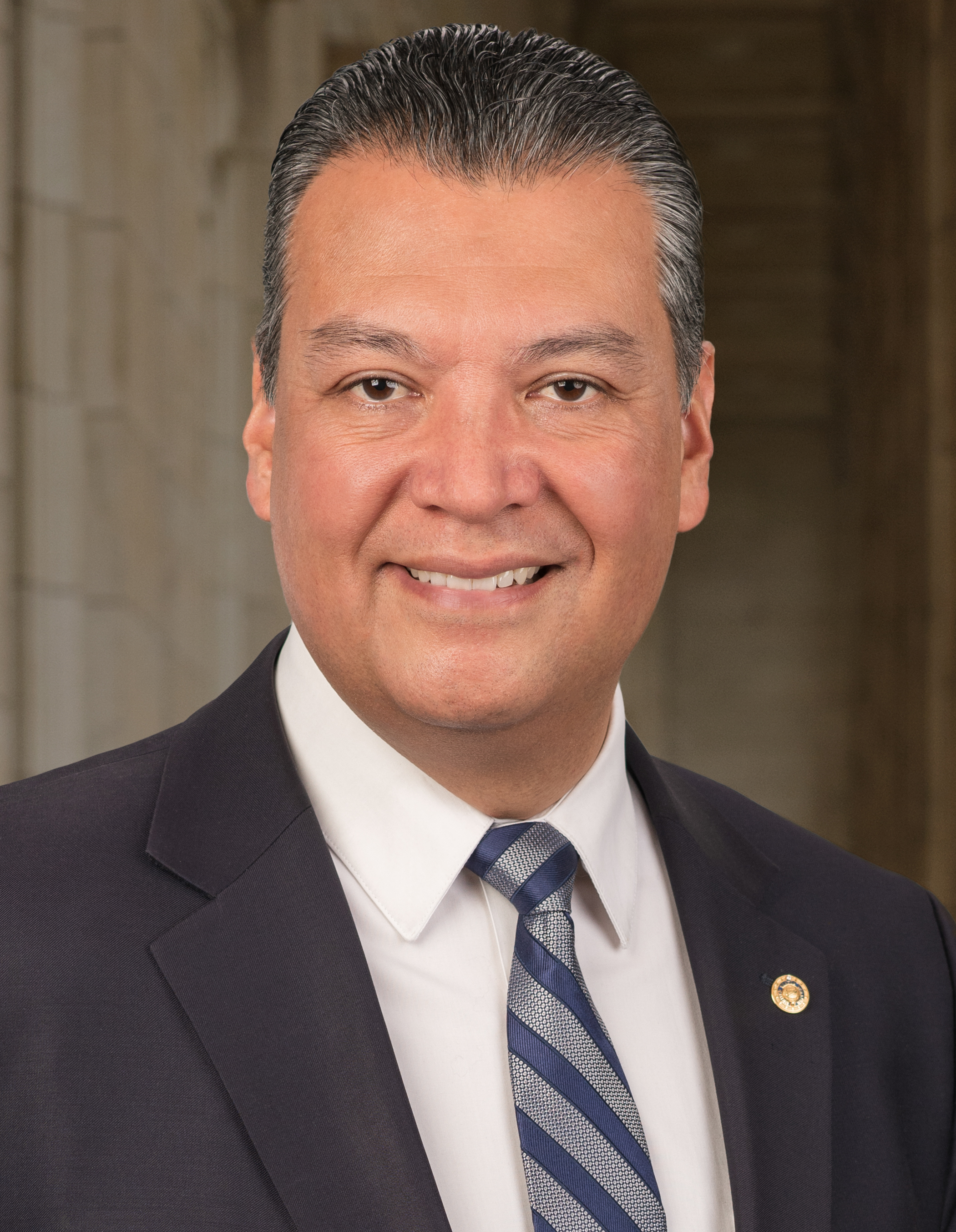
Alex Padilla (D)

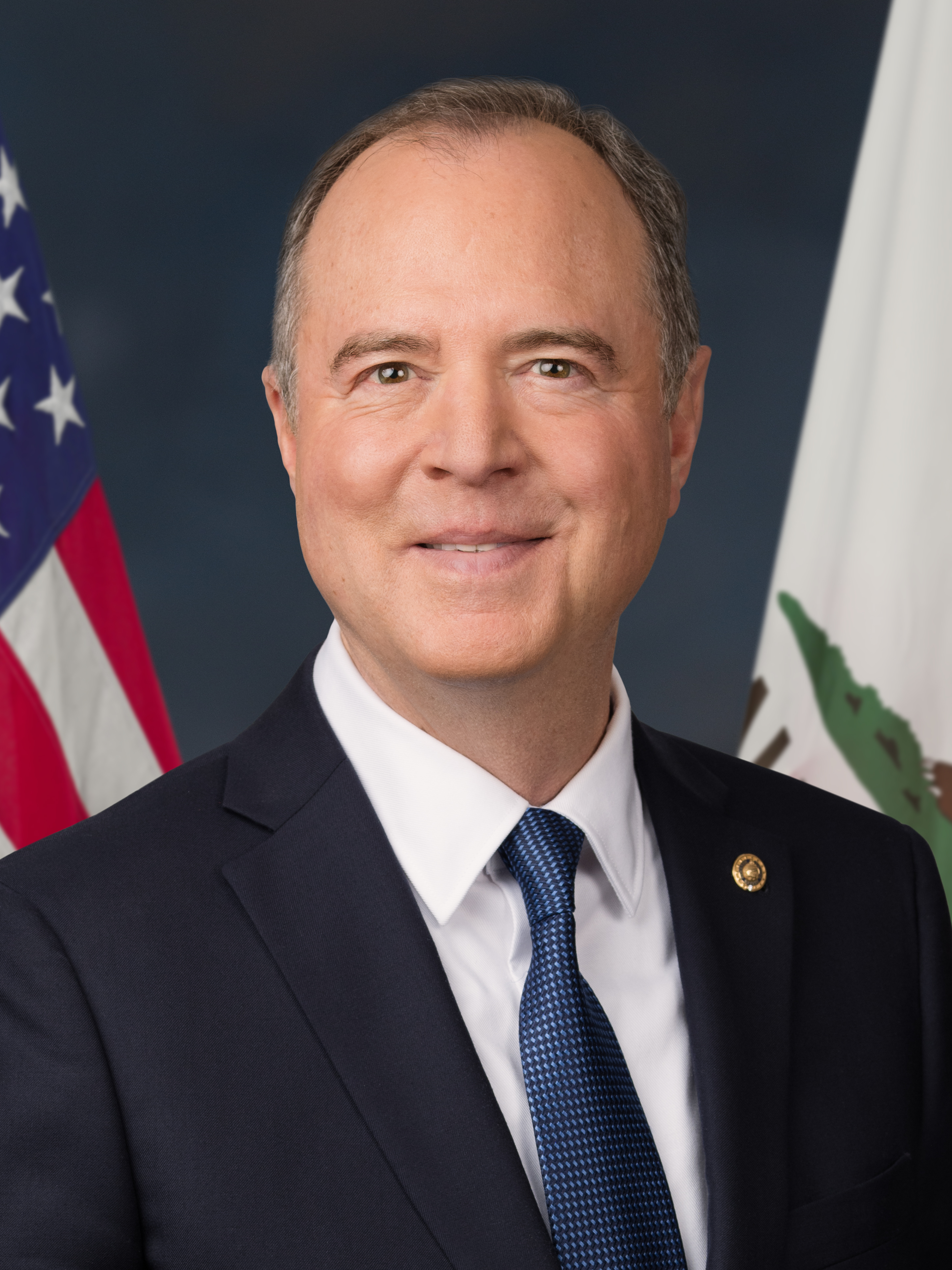
Adam Schiff (D)

(ordered by seniority)

California elects United States senators to class 1 and class 3. The state has been represented by 48 people in the Senate since it was admitted to the Union on September 9, 1850. Its U.S. senators are Democrats Alex Padilla and Adam Schiff. Dianne Feinstein was the state's longest serving senator, serving from 1992 until her death in 2023.

== List of senators ==
Class 1 Class 1 senators belong to the electoral cycle that most recently had regular elections in 2006, 2012, 2018, and 2024. The next election will be in 2030.						C	Class 3 Class 3 senators belong to the electoral cycle that most recently had regular elections in 2004, 2010, 2016, and 2022. The next election will be in 2028.					
#	Senator	Party	Dates in office	Electoral history	T	C	T	Electoral history	Dates in office	Party	Senator	#
1	John C. Frémont (San Francisco)	Democratic	Sep 9, 1850 – Mar 3, 1851	Elected in 1849.	1	31st	1	Elected in 1849.	Sep 9, 1850 – Mar 3, 1855	Democratic	William M. Gwin (San Francisco)	1
Vacant			Mar 4, 1851 – Jan 29, 1852	Legislature failed to elect.	2	32nd	1	Elected in 1849.	Sep 9, 1850 – Mar 3, 1855	Democratic	William M. Gwin (San Francisco)	1
2	John B. Weller (San Francisco)	Democratic	Jan 30, 1852 – Mar 3, 1857	Elected late in 1852. Lost re-election.	2	32nd	1	Elected in 1849.	Sep 9, 1850 – Mar 3, 1855	Democratic	William M. Gwin (San Francisco)	1
2	John B. Weller (San Francisco)	Democratic	Jan 30, 1852 – Mar 3, 1857	Elected late in 1852. Lost re-election.	2	33rd	1	Elected in 1849.	Sep 9, 1850 – Mar 3, 1855	Democratic	William M. Gwin (San Francisco)	1
2	John B. Weller (San Francisco)	Democratic	Jan 30, 1852 – Mar 3, 1857	Elected late in 1852. Lost re-election.	2	34th	2	Legislature failed to elect.	Mar 4, 1855 – Jan 13, 1857	Vacant		1
2	John B. Weller (San Francisco)	Democratic	Jan 30, 1852 – Mar 3, 1857	Elected late in 1852. Lost re-election.	2	34th	2	Elected late in 1857.	Jan 14, 1857 – Mar 3, 1861	Democratic	William M. Gwin (San Francisco)	1
3	David C. Broderick (San Francisco)	Democratic	Mar 4, 1857 – Sep 16, 1859	Elected in 1857. Died.	3	35th	2	Elected late in 1857.	Jan 14, 1857 – Mar 3, 1861	Democratic	William M. Gwin (San Francisco)	1
3	David C. Broderick (San Francisco)	Democratic	Mar 4, 1857 – Sep 16, 1859	Elected in 1857. Died.	3	36th	2	Elected late in 1857.	Jan 14, 1857 – Mar 3, 1861	Democratic	William M. Gwin (San Francisco)	1
Vacant			Sep 17, 1859 – Nov 2, 1859		3	36th	2	Elected late in 1857.	Jan 14, 1857 – Mar 3, 1861	Democratic	William M. Gwin (San Francisco)	1
4	Henry P. Haun (Marysville)	Democratic	Nov 3, 1859 – Mar 4, 1860	Appointed to continue Broderick's term. Lost election to finish Broderick's term.	3	36th	2	Elected late in 1857.	Jan 14, 1857 – Mar 3, 1861	Democratic	William M. Gwin (San Francisco)	1
5	Milton Latham (Sacramento)	Democratic	Mar 5, 1860 – Mar 3, 1863	Elected in 1860 to finish Broderick's term. Retired.	3	36th	2	Elected late in 1857.	Jan 14, 1857 – Mar 3, 1861	Democratic	William M. Gwin (San Francisco)	1
5	Milton Latham (Sacramento)	Democratic	Mar 5, 1860 – Mar 3, 1863	Elected in 1860 to finish Broderick's term. Retired.	3	37th	3	Elected in 1861. Retired.	Mar 4, 1861 – Mar 3, 1867	Democratic	James A. McDougall (San Francisco)	2
6	John Conness (Georgetown)	Union	Mar 4, 1863 – Mar 3, 1869	Elected in 1863.	4	38th	3	Elected in 1861. Retired.	Mar 4, 1861 – Mar 3, 1867	Democratic	James A. McDougall (San Francisco)	2
6	John Conness (Georgetown)	Union	Mar 4, 1863 – Mar 3, 1869	Elected in 1863.	4	39th	3	Elected in 1861. Retired.	Mar 4, 1861 – Mar 3, 1867	Democratic	James A. McDougall (San Francisco)	2
6	John Conness (Georgetown)	Union	Mar 4, 1863 – Mar 3, 1869	Elected in 1863.	4	40th	4	Elected in 1865.	Mar 4, 1867 – Mar 3, 1873	National Union	Cornelius Cole (San Francisco)	3
7	Eugene Casserly (San Francisco)	Democratic	Mar 4, 1869 – Nov 29, 1873	Elected in 1867. Resigned.	5	41st	4	Elected in 1865.	Mar 4, 1867 – Mar 3, 1873	National Union	Cornelius Cole (San Francisco)	3
7	Eugene Casserly (San Francisco)	Democratic	Mar 4, 1869 – Nov 29, 1873	Elected in 1867. Resigned.	5	42nd	4	Elected in 1865.	Mar 4, 1867 – Mar 3, 1873	National Union	Cornelius Cole (San Francisco)	3
7	Eugene Casserly (San Francisco)	Democratic	Mar 4, 1869 – Nov 29, 1873	Elected in 1867. Resigned.	5	43rd	5	Elected in 1871. Retired.	Mar 4, 1873 – Mar 3, 1879	Republican	Aaron A. Sargent (Nevada City)	4
Vacant			Nov 30, 1873 – Dec 22, 1873		5	43rd	5	Elected in 1871. Retired.	Mar 4, 1873 – Mar 3, 1879	Republican	Aaron A. Sargent (Nevada City)	4
8	John S. Hager (San Francisco)	Democratic	Dec 23, 1873 – Mar 3, 1875	Elected in 1873 to finish Casserly's term. Retired.	5	43rd	5	Elected in 1871. Retired.	Mar 4, 1873 – Mar 3, 1879	Republican	Aaron A. Sargent (Nevada City)	4
9	Newton Booth (San Francisco)	Anti-Monopoly	Mar 4, 1875 – Mar 3, 1881	Elected early in 1873. Retired.	6	44th	5	Elected in 1871. Retired.	Mar 4, 1873 – Mar 3, 1879	Republican	Aaron A. Sargent (Nevada City)	4
9	Newton Booth (San Francisco)	Anti-Monopoly	Mar 4, 1875 – Mar 3, 1881	Elected early in 1873. Retired.	6	45th	5	Elected in 1871. Retired.	Mar 4, 1873 – Mar 3, 1879	Republican	Aaron A. Sargent (Nevada City)	4
9	Newton Booth (San Francisco)	Anti-Monopoly	Mar 4, 1875 – Mar 3, 1881	Elected early in 1873. Retired.	6	46th	6	Elected in 1877. Retired.	Mar 4, 1879 – Mar 3, 1885	Democratic	James T. Farley (Jackson)	5
10	John Franklin Miller (San Francisco)	Republican	Mar 4, 1881 – Mar 8, 1886	Elected in 1881. Died.	7	47th	6	Elected in 1877. Retired.	Mar 4, 1879 – Mar 3, 1885	Democratic	James T. Farley (Jackson)	5
10	John Franklin Miller (San Francisco)	Republican	Mar 4, 1881 – Mar 8, 1886	Elected in 1881. Died.	7	48th	6	Elected in 1877. Retired.	Mar 4, 1879 – Mar 3, 1885	Democratic	James T. Farley (Jackson)	5
10	John Franklin Miller (San Francisco)	Republican	Mar 4, 1881 – Mar 8, 1886	Elected in 1881. Died.	7	49th	7	Elected in 1885.	Mar 4, 1885 – Jun 21, 1893	Republican	Leland Stanford (San Francisco)	6
Vacant			Mar 9, 1886 – Mar 22, 1886		7	49th	7	Elected in 1885.	Mar 4, 1885 – Jun 21, 1893	Republican	Leland Stanford (San Francisco)	6
11	George Hearst (San Francisco)	Democratic	Mar 23, 1886 – Aug 3, 1886	Appointed to continue Miller's term. Successor elected.	7	49th	7	Elected in 1885.	Mar 4, 1885 – Jun 21, 1893	Republican	Leland Stanford (San Francisco)	6
12	Abram Williams (San Francisco)	Republican	Aug 4, 1886 – Mar 3, 1887	Elected in 1886 to finish Miller's term. Retired.	7	49th	7	Elected in 1885.	Mar 4, 1885 – Jun 21, 1893	Republican	Leland Stanford (San Francisco)	6
13	George Hearst (San Francisco)	Democratic	Mar 4, 1887 – Feb 28, 1891	Elected in 1887. Died.	8	50th	7	Elected in 1885.	Mar 4, 1885 – Jun 21, 1893	Republican	Leland Stanford (San Francisco)	6
13	George Hearst (San Francisco)	Democratic	Mar 4, 1887 – Feb 28, 1891	Elected in 1887. Died.	8	51st	7	Elected in 1885.	Mar 4, 1885 – Jun 21, 1893	Republican	Leland Stanford (San Francisco)	6
Vacant			Mar 1, 1891 – Mar 18, 1891		8	51st	7	Elected in 1885.	Mar 4, 1885 – Jun 21, 1893	Republican	Leland Stanford (San Francisco)	6
Vacant			Mar 1, 1891 – Mar 18, 1891		8	52nd	8	Re-elected in 1891. Died.	Mar 4, 1885 – Jun 21, 1893	Republican	Leland Stanford (San Francisco)	6
14	Charles N. Felton (San Francisco)	Republican	Mar 19, 1891 – Mar 3, 1893	Elected in 1891 to finish Hearst's term. Retired.	8	52nd	8	Re-elected in 1891. Died.	Mar 4, 1885 – Jun 21, 1893	Republican	Leland Stanford (San Francisco)	6
15	Stephen M. White (Los Angeles)	Democratic	Mar 4, 1893 – Mar 3, 1899	Elected in 1893. Retired.	9	53rd	8	Re-elected in 1891. Died.	Mar 4, 1885 – Jun 21, 1893	Republican	Leland Stanford (San Francisco)	6
15	Stephen M. White (Los Angeles)	Democratic	Mar 4, 1893 – Mar 3, 1899	Elected in 1893. Retired.	9	53rd	8		Jun 22, 1893 – Jul 25, 1893	Vacant		
15	Stephen M. White (Los Angeles)	Democratic	Mar 4, 1893 – Mar 3, 1899	Elected in 1893. Retired.	9	53rd	8	Appointed to continue Stanford's term. Elected in 1895 to finish Stanford's term.	Jul 26, 1893 – Mar 3, 1915	Republican	George C. Perkins (Oakland)	7
15	Stephen M. White (Los Angeles)	Democratic	Mar 4, 1893 – Mar 3, 1899	Elected in 1893. Retired.	9	54th	8	Appointed to continue Stanford's term. Elected in 1895 to finish Stanford's term.	Jul 26, 1893 – Mar 3, 1915	Republican	George C. Perkins (Oakland)	7
15	Stephen M. White (Los Angeles)	Democratic	Mar 4, 1893 – Mar 3, 1899	Elected in 1893. Retired.	9	55th	9	Re-elected in 1897.	Jul 26, 1893 – Mar 3, 1915	Republican	George C. Perkins (Oakland)	7
Vacant			Mar 4, 1899 – Feb 6, 1900		10	56th	9	Re-elected in 1897.	Jul 26, 1893 – Mar 3, 1915	Republican	George C. Perkins (Oakland)	7
16	Thomas R. Bard (Port Hueneme)	Republican	Feb 7, 1900 – Mar 3, 1905	Elected late in 1900. Lost re-election.	10	56th	9	Re-elected in 1897.	Jul 26, 1893 – Mar 3, 1915	Republican	George C. Perkins (Oakland)	7
16	Thomas R. Bard (Port Hueneme)	Republican	Feb 7, 1900 – Mar 3, 1905	Elected late in 1900. Lost re-election.	10	57th	9	Re-elected in 1897.	Jul 26, 1893 – Mar 3, 1915	Republican	George C. Perkins (Oakland)	7
16	Thomas R. Bard (Port Hueneme)	Republican	Feb 7, 1900 – Mar 3, 1905	Elected late in 1900. Lost re-election.	10	58th	10	Re-elected in 1903.	Jul 26, 1893 – Mar 3, 1915	Republican	George C. Perkins (Oakland)	7
17	Frank P. Flint (Los Angeles)	Republican	Mar 4, 1905 – Mar 3, 1911	Elected in 1905. Retired.	11	59th	10	Re-elected in 1903.	Jul 26, 1893 – Mar 3, 1915	Republican	George C. Perkins (Oakland)	7
17	Frank P. Flint (Los Angeles)	Republican	Mar 4, 1905 – Mar 3, 1911	Elected in 1905. Retired.	11	60th	10	Re-elected in 1903.	Jul 26, 1893 – Mar 3, 1915	Republican	George C. Perkins (Oakland)	7
17	Frank P. Flint (Los Angeles)	Republican	Mar 4, 1905 – Mar 3, 1911	Elected in 1905. Retired.	11	61st	11	Re-elected in 1909. Retired.	Jul 26, 1893 – Mar 3, 1915	Republican	George C. Perkins (Oakland)	7
18	John D. Works (Los Angeles)	Republican	Mar 4, 1911 – Mar 3, 1917	Elected in 1911. Retired.	12	62nd	11	Re-elected in 1909. Retired.	Jul 26, 1893 – Mar 3, 1915	Republican	George C. Perkins (Oakland)	7
18	John D. Works (Los Angeles)	Republican	Mar 4, 1911 – Mar 3, 1917	Elected in 1911. Retired.	12	63rd	11	Re-elected in 1909. Retired.	Jul 26, 1893 – Mar 3, 1915	Republican	George C. Perkins (Oakland)	7
18	John D. Works (Los Angeles)	Republican	Mar 4, 1911 – Mar 3, 1917	Elected in 1911. Retired.	12	64th	12	Elected in 1914. Lost re-election.	Mar 4, 1915 – Mar 3, 1921	Democratic	James D. Phelan (San Francisco)	8
19	Hiram Johnson (San Francisco)	Republican	Mar 4, 1917 – Aug 6, 1945	Elected in 1916. Not seated until March 16 in order to remain governor of California.	13	65th	12	Elected in 1914. Lost re-election.	Mar 4, 1915 – Mar 3, 1921	Democratic	James D. Phelan (San Francisco)	8
19	Hiram Johnson (San Francisco)	Republican	Mar 4, 1917 – Aug 6, 1945	Elected in 1916. Not seated until March 16 in order to remain governor of California.	13	66th	12	Elected in 1914. Lost re-election.	Mar 4, 1915 – Mar 3, 1921	Democratic	James D. Phelan (San Francisco)	8
19	Hiram Johnson (San Francisco)	Republican	Mar 4, 1917 – Aug 6, 1945	Elected in 1916. Not seated until March 16 in order to remain governor of California.	13	67th	13	Elected in 1920.	Mar 4, 1921 – Mar 3, 1933	Republican	Samuel M. Shortridge (Menlo Park)	9
19	Hiram Johnson (San Francisco)	Republican	Mar 4, 1917 – Aug 6, 1945	Re-elected in 1922.	14	68th	13	Elected in 1920.	Mar 4, 1921 – Mar 3, 1933	Republican	Samuel M. Shortridge (Menlo Park)	9
19	Hiram Johnson (San Francisco)	Republican	Mar 4, 1917 – Aug 6, 1945	Re-elected in 1922.	14	69th	13	Elected in 1920.	Mar 4, 1921 – Mar 3, 1933	Republican	Samuel M. Shortridge (Menlo Park)	9
19	Hiram Johnson (San Francisco)	Republican	Mar 4, 1917 – Aug 6, 1945	Re-elected in 1922.	14	70th	14	Re-elected in 1926. Lost renomination.	Mar 4, 1921 – Mar 3, 1933	Republican	Samuel M. Shortridge (Menlo Park)	9
19	Hiram Johnson (San Francisco)	Republican	Mar 4, 1917 – Aug 6, 1945	Re-elected in 1928.	15	71st	14	Re-elected in 1926. Lost renomination.	Mar 4, 1921 – Mar 3, 1933	Republican	Samuel M. Shortridge (Menlo Park)	9
19	Hiram Johnson (San Francisco)	Republican	Mar 4, 1917 – Aug 6, 1945	Re-elected in 1928.	15	72nd	14	Re-elected in 1926. Lost renomination.	Mar 4, 1921 – Mar 3, 1933	Republican	Samuel M. Shortridge (Menlo Park)	9
19	Hiram Johnson (San Francisco)	Republican	Mar 4, 1917 – Aug 6, 1945	Re-elected in 1928.	15	73rd	15	Elected in 1932. Lost renomination, then resigned.	Mar 4, 1933 – Nov 8, 1938	Democratic	William Gibbs McAdoo (Los Angeles)	10
19	Hiram Johnson (San Francisco)	Republican	Mar 4, 1917 – Aug 6, 1945	Re-elected in 1934.	16	74th	15	Elected in 1932. Lost renomination, then resigned.	Mar 4, 1933 – Nov 8, 1938	Democratic	William Gibbs McAdoo (Los Angeles)	10
19	Hiram Johnson (San Francisco)	Republican	Mar 4, 1917 – Aug 6, 1945	Re-elected in 1934.	16	75th	15	Elected in 1932. Lost renomination, then resigned.	Mar 4, 1933 – Nov 8, 1938	Democratic	William Gibbs McAdoo (Los Angeles)	10
19	Hiram Johnson (San Francisco)	Republican	Mar 4, 1917 – Aug 6, 1945	Re-elected in 1934.	16	75th	15	Appointed to finish McAdoo's term. Retired.	Nov 9, 1938 – Jan 3, 1939	Democratic	Thomas M. Storke (Santa Barbara)	11
19	Hiram Johnson (San Francisco)	Republican	Mar 4, 1917 – Aug 6, 1945	Re-elected in 1934.	16	76th	16	Elected in 1938.	Jan 3, 1939 – Nov 30, 1950	Democratic	Sheridan Downey (San Francisco)	12
19	Hiram Johnson (San Francisco)	Republican	Mar 4, 1917 – Aug 6, 1945	Re-elected in 1940. Died.	17	77th	16	Elected in 1938.	Jan 3, 1939 – Nov 30, 1950	Democratic	Sheridan Downey (San Francisco)	12
19	Hiram Johnson (San Francisco)	Republican	Mar 4, 1917 – Aug 6, 1945	Re-elected in 1940. Died.	17	78th	16	Elected in 1938.	Jan 3, 1939 – Nov 30, 1950	Democratic	Sheridan Downey (San Francisco)	12
19	Hiram Johnson (San Francisco)	Republican	Mar 4, 1917 – Aug 6, 1945	Re-elected in 1940. Died.	17	79th	17	Re-elected in 1944. Ran for re-election, but withdrew from renomination due to ill health. Resigned early due to ill health.	Jan 3, 1939 – Nov 30, 1950	Democratic	Sheridan Downey (San Francisco)	12
Vacant			Aug 7, 1945 – Aug 25, 1945		17	79th	17	Re-elected in 1944. Ran for re-election, but withdrew from renomination due to ill health. Resigned early due to ill health.	Jan 3, 1939 – Nov 30, 1950	Democratic	Sheridan Downey (San Francisco)	12
20	William F. Knowland (Piedmont)	Republican	Aug 26, 1945 – Jan 3, 1959	Appointed to continue Johnson's term. Elected in 1946 to finish Johnson's term. (Note: Knowland was elected to finish the remainder of Hiram Johnson's term in a special election held the same day as the general election for the next term, which he also won.)	17	79th	17	Re-elected in 1944. Ran for re-election, but withdrew from renomination due to ill health. Resigned early due to ill health.	Jan 3, 1939 – Nov 30, 1950	Democratic	Sheridan Downey (San Francisco)	12
20	William F. Knowland (Piedmont)	Republican	Aug 26, 1945 – Jan 3, 1959	Elected to full term in 1946.	18	80th	17	Re-elected in 1944. Ran for re-election, but withdrew from renomination due to ill health. Resigned early due to ill health.	Jan 3, 1939 – Nov 30, 1950	Democratic	Sheridan Downey (San Francisco)	12
20	William F. Knowland (Piedmont)	Republican	Aug 26, 1945 – Jan 3, 1959	Elected to full term in 1946.	18	81st	17	Re-elected in 1944. Ran for re-election, but withdrew from renomination due to ill health. Resigned early due to ill health.	Jan 3, 1939 – Nov 30, 1950	Democratic	Sheridan Downey (San Francisco)	12
20	William F. Knowland (Piedmont)	Republican	Aug 26, 1945 – Jan 3, 1959	Elected to full term in 1946.	18	81st	17	Appointed to finish Downey's term, having been elected to the next term.	Dec 1, 1950 – Jan 1, 1953	Republican	Richard Nixon (Whittier)	13
20	William F. Knowland (Piedmont)	Republican	Aug 26, 1945 – Jan 3, 1959	Elected to full term in 1946.	18	82nd	18	Elected in 1950. Resigned to become U.S. Vice President.	Dec 1, 1950 – Jan 1, 1953	Republican	Richard Nixon (Whittier)	13
20	William F. Knowland (Piedmont)	Republican	Aug 26, 1945 – Jan 3, 1959	Elected to full term in 1946.	18	82nd	18	Appointed to continue Nixon's term. Elected in 1954 to finish Nixon's term.	Jan 2, 1953 – Jan 3, 1969	Republican	Thomas Kuchel (Anaheim)	14
20	William F. Knowland (Piedmont)	Republican	Aug 26, 1945 – Jan 3, 1959	Re-elected in 1952. Retired to run for governor of California.	19	83rd	18	Appointed to continue Nixon's term. Elected in 1954 to finish Nixon's term.	Jan 2, 1953 – Jan 3, 1969	Republican	Thomas Kuchel (Anaheim)	14
20	William F. Knowland (Piedmont)	Republican	Aug 26, 1945 – Jan 3, 1959	Re-elected in 1952. Retired to run for governor of California.	19	84th	18	Appointed to continue Nixon's term. Elected in 1954 to finish Nixon's term.	Jan 2, 1953 – Jan 3, 1969	Republican	Thomas Kuchel (Anaheim)	14
20	William F. Knowland (Piedmont)	Republican	Aug 26, 1945 – Jan 3, 1959	Re-elected in 1952. Retired to run for governor of California.	19	85th	19	Re-elected in 1956.	Jan 2, 1953 – Jan 3, 1969	Republican	Thomas Kuchel (Anaheim)	14
21	Clair Engle (Red Bluff)	Democratic	Jan 3, 1959 – Jul 30, 1964	Elected in 1958. Died.	20	86th	19	Re-elected in 1956.	Jan 2, 1953 – Jan 3, 1969	Republican	Thomas Kuchel (Anaheim)	14
21	Clair Engle (Red Bluff)	Democratic	Jan 3, 1959 – Jul 30, 1964	Elected in 1958. Died.	20	87th	19	Re-elected in 1956.	Jan 2, 1953 – Jan 3, 1969	Republican	Thomas Kuchel (Anaheim)	14
21	Clair Engle (Red Bluff)	Democratic	Jan 3, 1959 – Jul 30, 1964	Elected in 1958. Died.	20	88th	20	Re-elected in 1962. Lost renomination.	Jan 2, 1953 – Jan 3, 1969	Republican	Thomas Kuchel (Anaheim)	14
Vacant			Jul 31, 1964 – Aug 3, 1964		20	88th	20	Re-elected in 1962. Lost renomination.	Jan 2, 1953 – Jan 3, 1969	Republican	Thomas Kuchel (Anaheim)	14
22	Pierre Salinger (San Francisco)	Democratic	Aug 4, 1964 – Dec 31, 1964	Appointed to finish Engle's term. Lost election to full term, resigned early to give successor preferential seniority.	20	88th	20	Re-elected in 1962. Lost renomination.	Jan 2, 1953 – Jan 3, 1969	Republican	Thomas Kuchel (Anaheim)	14
23	George Murphy (Beverly Hills)	Republican	Jan 1, 1965 – Jan 1, 1971	Appointed early to finish Engle's term, having been elected to the next term.	20	88th	20	Re-elected in 1962. Lost renomination.	Jan 2, 1953 – Jan 3, 1969	Republican	Thomas Kuchel (Anaheim)	14
23	George Murphy (Beverly Hills)	Republican	Jan 1, 1965 – Jan 1, 1971	Elected in 1964. Lost re-election, resigned early to give successor preferential seniority.	21	89th	20	Re-elected in 1962. Lost renomination.	Jan 2, 1953 – Jan 3, 1969	Republican	Thomas Kuchel (Anaheim)	14
23	George Murphy (Beverly Hills)	Republican	Jan 1, 1965 – Jan 1, 1971	Elected in 1964. Lost re-election, resigned early to give successor preferential seniority.	21	90th	20	Re-elected in 1962. Lost renomination.	Jan 2, 1953 – Jan 3, 1969	Republican	Thomas Kuchel (Anaheim)	14
23	George Murphy (Beverly Hills)	Republican	Jan 1, 1965 – Jan 1, 1971	Elected in 1964. Lost re-election, resigned early to give successor preferential seniority.	21	91st	21	Elected in 1968.	Jan 3, 1969 – Jan 3, 1993	Democratic	Alan Cranston (Los Angeles)	15
24	John V. Tunney (Riverside)	Democratic	Jan 2, 1971 – Jan 1, 1977	Appointed to finish Murphy's term, having been elected to the next term.	21	91st	21	Elected in 1968.	Jan 3, 1969 – Jan 3, 1993	Democratic	Alan Cranston (Los Angeles)	15
24	John V. Tunney (Riverside)	Democratic	Jan 2, 1971 – Jan 1, 1977	Elected in 1970. Lost re-election, resigned early to give successor preferential seniority.	22	92nd	21	Elected in 1968.	Jan 3, 1969 – Jan 3, 1993	Democratic	Alan Cranston (Los Angeles)	15
24	John V. Tunney (Riverside)	Democratic	Jan 2, 1971 – Jan 1, 1977	Elected in 1970. Lost re-election, resigned early to give successor preferential seniority.	22	93rd	21	Elected in 1968.	Jan 3, 1969 – Jan 3, 1993	Democratic	Alan Cranston (Los Angeles)	15
24	John V. Tunney (Riverside)	Democratic	Jan 2, 1971 – Jan 1, 1977	Elected in 1970. Lost re-election, resigned early to give successor preferential seniority.	22	94th	22	Re-elected in 1974.	Jan 3, 1969 – Jan 3, 1993	Democratic	Alan Cranston (Los Angeles)	15
25	S. I. Hayakawa (Mill Valley)	Republican	Jan 2, 1977 – Jan 3, 1983	Appointed to finish Tunney's term, having been elected to the next term.	22	94th	22	Re-elected in 1974.	Jan 3, 1969 – Jan 3, 1993	Democratic	Alan Cranston (Los Angeles)	15
25	S. I. Hayakawa (Mill Valley)	Republican	Jan 2, 1977 – Jan 3, 1983	Elected in 1976. Retired.	23	95th	22	Re-elected in 1974.	Jan 3, 1969 – Jan 3, 1993	Democratic	Alan Cranston (Los Angeles)	15
25	S. I. Hayakawa (Mill Valley)	Republican	Jan 2, 1977 – Jan 3, 1983	Elected in 1976. Retired.	23	96th	22	Re-elected in 1974.	Jan 3, 1969 – Jan 3, 1993	Democratic	Alan Cranston (Los Angeles)	15
25	S. I. Hayakawa (Mill Valley)	Republican	Jan 2, 1977 – Jan 3, 1983	Elected in 1976. Retired.	23	97th	23	Re-elected in 1980.	Jan 3, 1969 – Jan 3, 1993	Democratic	Alan Cranston (Los Angeles)	15
26	Pete Wilson (San Diego)	Republican	Jan 3, 1983 – Jan 7, 1991	Elected in 1982.	24	98th	23	Re-elected in 1980.	Jan 3, 1969 – Jan 3, 1993	Democratic	Alan Cranston (Los Angeles)	15
26	Pete Wilson (San Diego)	Republican	Jan 3, 1983 – Jan 7, 1991	Elected in 1982.	24	99th	23	Re-elected in 1980.	Jan 3, 1969 – Jan 3, 1993	Democratic	Alan Cranston (Los Angeles)	15
26	Pete Wilson (San Diego)	Republican	Jan 3, 1983 – Jan 7, 1991	Elected in 1982.	24	100th	24	Re-elected in 1986. Retired.	Jan 3, 1969 – Jan 3, 1993	Democratic	Alan Cranston (Los Angeles)	15
26	Pete Wilson (San Diego)	Republican	Jan 3, 1983 – Jan 7, 1991	Re-elected in 1988. Resigned to become governor of California.	25	101st	24	Re-elected in 1986. Retired.	Jan 3, 1969 – Jan 3, 1993	Democratic	Alan Cranston (Los Angeles)	15
26	Pete Wilson (San Diego)	Republican	Jan 3, 1983 – Jan 7, 1991	Re-elected in 1988. Resigned to become governor of California.	25	102nd	24	Re-elected in 1986. Retired.	Jan 3, 1969 – Jan 3, 1993	Democratic	Alan Cranston (Los Angeles)	15
27	John Seymour (Anaheim)	Republican	Jan 7, 1991 – Nov 3, 1992	Appointed to continue Wilson's term. Lost election to finish Wilson's term.	25	102nd	24	Re-elected in 1986. Retired.	Jan 3, 1969 – Jan 3, 1993	Democratic	Alan Cranston (Los Angeles)	15
28	Dianne Feinstein (San Francisco)	Democratic	Nov 4, 1992 – Sep 29, 2023	Elected in 1992 to finish Wilson's term.	25	102nd	24	Re-elected in 1986. Retired.	Jan 3, 1969 – Jan 3, 1993	Democratic	Alan Cranston (Los Angeles)	15
28	Dianne Feinstein (San Francisco)	Democratic	Nov 4, 1992 – Sep 29, 2023	Elected in 1992 to finish Wilson's term.	25	103rd	25	Elected in 1992.	Jan 3, 1993 – Jan 3, 2017	Democratic	Barbara Boxer (Greenbrae)	16
28	Dianne Feinstein (San Francisco)	Democratic	Nov 4, 1992 – Sep 29, 2023	Re-elected in 1994.	26	104th	25	Elected in 1992.	Jan 3, 1993 – Jan 3, 2017	Democratic	Barbara Boxer (Greenbrae)	16
28	Dianne Feinstein (San Francisco)	Democratic	Nov 4, 1992 – Sep 29, 2023	Re-elected in 1994.	26	105th	25	Elected in 1992.	Jan 3, 1993 – Jan 3, 2017	Democratic	Barbara Boxer (Greenbrae)	16
28	Dianne Feinstein (San Francisco)	Democratic	Nov 4, 1992 – Sep 29, 2023	Re-elected in 1994.	26	106th	26	Re-elected in 1998.	Jan 3, 1993 – Jan 3, 2017	Democratic	Barbara Boxer (Greenbrae)	16
28	Dianne Feinstein (San Francisco)	Democratic	Nov 4, 1992 – Sep 29, 2023	Re-elected in 2000.	27	107th	26	Re-elected in 1998.	Jan 3, 1993 – Jan 3, 2017	Democratic	Barbara Boxer (Greenbrae)	16
28	Dianne Feinstein (San Francisco)	Democratic	Nov 4, 1992 – Sep 29, 2023	Re-elected in 2000.	27	108th	26	Re-elected in 1998.	Jan 3, 1993 – Jan 3, 2017	Democratic	Barbara Boxer (Greenbrae)	16
28	Dianne Feinstein (San Francisco)	Democratic	Nov 4, 1992 – Sep 29, 2023	Re-elected in 2000.	27	109th	27	Re-elected in 2004.	Jan 3, 1993 – Jan 3, 2017	Democratic	Barbara Boxer (Greenbrae)	16
28	Dianne Feinstein (San Francisco)	Democratic	Nov 4, 1992 – Sep 29, 2023	Re-elected in 2006.	28	110th	27	Re-elected in 2004.	Jan 3, 1993 – Jan 3, 2017	Democratic	Barbara Boxer (Greenbrae)	16
28	Dianne Feinstein (San Francisco)	Democratic	Nov 4, 1992 – Sep 29, 2023	Re-elected in 2006.	28	111th	27	Re-elected in 2004.	Jan 3, 1993 – Jan 3, 2017	Democratic	Barbara Boxer (Greenbrae)	16
28	Dianne Feinstein (San Francisco)	Democratic	Nov 4, 1992 – Sep 29, 2023	Re-elected in 2006.	28	112th	28	Re-elected in 2010. Retired.	Jan 3, 1993 – Jan 3, 2017	Democratic	Barbara Boxer (Greenbrae)	16
28	Dianne Feinstein (San Francisco)	Democratic	Nov 4, 1992 – Sep 29, 2023	Re-elected in 2012.	29	113th	28	Re-elected in 2010. Retired.	Jan 3, 1993 – Jan 3, 2017	Democratic	Barbara Boxer (Greenbrae)	16
28	Dianne Feinstein (San Francisco)	Democratic	Nov 4, 1992 – Sep 29, 2023	Re-elected in 2012.	29	114th	28	Re-elected in 2010. Retired.	Jan 3, 1993 – Jan 3, 2017	Democratic	Barbara Boxer (Greenbrae)	16
28	Dianne Feinstein (San Francisco)	Democratic	Nov 4, 1992 – Sep 29, 2023	Re-elected in 2012.	29	115th	29	Elected in 2016. Resigned to become U.S. Vice President.	Jan 3, 2017 – Jan 18, 2021	Democratic	Kamala Harris (Los Angeles)	17
28	Dianne Feinstein (San Francisco)	Democratic	Nov 4, 1992 – Sep 29, 2023	Re-elected in 2018. Died. (Note: Feinstein died after having already announced her intention to retire at the end of the term.)	30	116th	29	Elected in 2016. Resigned to become U.S. Vice President.	Jan 3, 2017 – Jan 18, 2021	Democratic	Kamala Harris (Los Angeles)	17
28	Dianne Feinstein (San Francisco)	Democratic	Nov 4, 1992 – Sep 29, 2023	Re-elected in 2018. Died.	30	117th	29	Elected in 2016. Resigned to become U.S. Vice President.	Jan 3, 2017 – Jan 18, 2021	Democratic	Kamala Harris (Los Angeles)	17
28	Dianne Feinstein (San Francisco)	Democratic	Nov 4, 1992 – Sep 29, 2023	Re-elected in 2018. Died.	30	117th	29	Appointed to continue Harris's term. Elected in 2022 to finish Harris's term. (Note: Padilla was elected to finish the remainder of Kamala Harris's term in a special election held the same day as the general election for the next term, which he also won.)	Jan 18, 2021 – present	Democratic	Alex Padilla (Los Angeles)	18
28	Dianne Feinstein (San Francisco)	Democratic	Nov 4, 1992 – Sep 29, 2023	Re-elected in 2018. Died.	30	118th	30	Elected to full term in 2022.	Jan 18, 2021 – present	Democratic	Alex Padilla (Los Angeles)	18
Vacant			Sep 29, 2023 – Oct 1, 2023		30	118th	30	Elected to full term in 2022.	Jan 18, 2021 – present	Democratic	Alex Padilla (Los Angeles)	18
29	Laphonza Butler (View Park–Windsor Hills)	Democratic	Oct 1, 2023 – Dec 8, 2024	Appointed to continue Feinstein's term. Retired when her successor was elected, resigned early to give successor preferential seniority.	30	118th	30	Elected to full term in 2022.	Jan 18, 2021 – present	Democratic	Alex Padilla (Los Angeles)	18
30	Adam Schiff (Burbank)	Democratic	Dec 8, 2024 – present	Appointed early to continue Feinstein's term, having already been elected to finish the term. (Note: Schiff was elected to finish the remainder of Dianne Feinstein's term in a special election held the same day as the general election for the next term, which he also won.)	30	118th	30	Elected to full term in 2022.	Jan 18, 2021 – present	Democratic	Alex Padilla (Los Angeles)	18
30	Adam Schiff (Burbank)	Democratic	Dec 8, 2024 – present	Elected to full term in 2024.	31	119th	30	Elected to full term in 2022.	Jan 18, 2021 – present	Democratic	Alex Padilla (Los Angeles)	18
30	Adam Schiff (Burbank)	Democratic	Dec 8, 2024 – present	Elected to full term in 2024.	31	120th	30	Elected to full term in 2022.	Jan 18, 2021 – present	Democratic	Alex Padilla (Los Angeles)	18
30	Adam Schiff (Burbank)	Democratic	Dec 8, 2024 – present	Elected to full term in 2024.	31	121st	31	To be determined in the 2028 election.				
To be determined in the 2030 election.					32	122nd	31	To be determined in the 2028 election.				

== See also ==
- California's congressional delegations
- Elections in California
- List of United States representatives from California
- List of United States Senate elections in California
