= George Hearst =

American businessman and politician (1820–1891)

- Portrait by C. M. Bell c. 1886–1890

United States Senator from California
- In office March 4, 1887 – February 28, 1891
- Preceded by: Abram P. Williams
- Succeeded by: Charles N. Felton
- In office March 23, 1886 – August 4, 1886
- Appointed by: George Stoneman
- Preceded by: John F. Miller
- Succeeded by: Abram P. Williams

Member of the California State Assembly from the 8th district
- In office December 4, 1865 – December 2, 1867
- Preceded by: Multi-member district
- Succeeded by: Multi-member district

Personal details
- Born: September 3, 1820 Sullivan, Missouri Territory, U.S.
- Died: February 28, 1891 (aged 70) Washington, D.C., U.S.
- Resting place: Cypress Lawn Memorial Park, Colma, California, U.S.
- Party: Democratic
- Spouse: Phoebe Elizabeth Apperson (m. 1862)
- Children: William Randolph Hearst
- Profession: Business magnate; politician
- Net worth: USD $19 million at the time of his death, equivalent to $681 million in 2021

George Hearst (September 3, 1820 – February 28, 1891) was an American businessman, politician, and patriarch of the Hearst business dynasty. After growing up on a small farm in Missouri, he founded many mining operations and is known for developing and expanding the Homestake Mine in the late 1870s in the Black Hills of South Dakota. In 1879, he listed it on the New York Stock Exchange and went on to other pursuits. The mine's gold production continued uninterrupted until 2001.

After settling in San Francisco in the early 1860s, Hearst became a politician, first representing San Francisco in the state legislature for one term. He also maintained mining interests through his company. Hearst was appointed as a United States senator in 1886 to fill a vacancy and was elected as a Democrat later that year on his own account. He served in the Senate from 1887 to his death in 1891. His only child from his late marriage (at age 42) was his son William Randolph Hearst, who became internationally known as a newspaperman and publisher and was a primary inspiration for Orson Welles's 1941 film Citizen Kane.

== Early life ==
Hearst was born near present-day Sullivan, Missouri, to William G. Hearst and Elizabeth Collins, who were of Scots-Irish ancestry. Hearst, one of three children – two boys and a girl – was raised in a log cabin on his family's farm in rural Franklin County. His father operated three small farms, all of which were mortgaged. William Hearst sold his products in his own local general store.

George Hearst grew up before public education was widely available in Missouri, meaning his elementary education was inconsistent and fragmented. Becoming interested in mining, Hearst supplemented the gaps in his formal education by observing the local mines, reading information about minerals from books owned by his family doctor Silas Reed and mining in his free time.

== Mining career ==
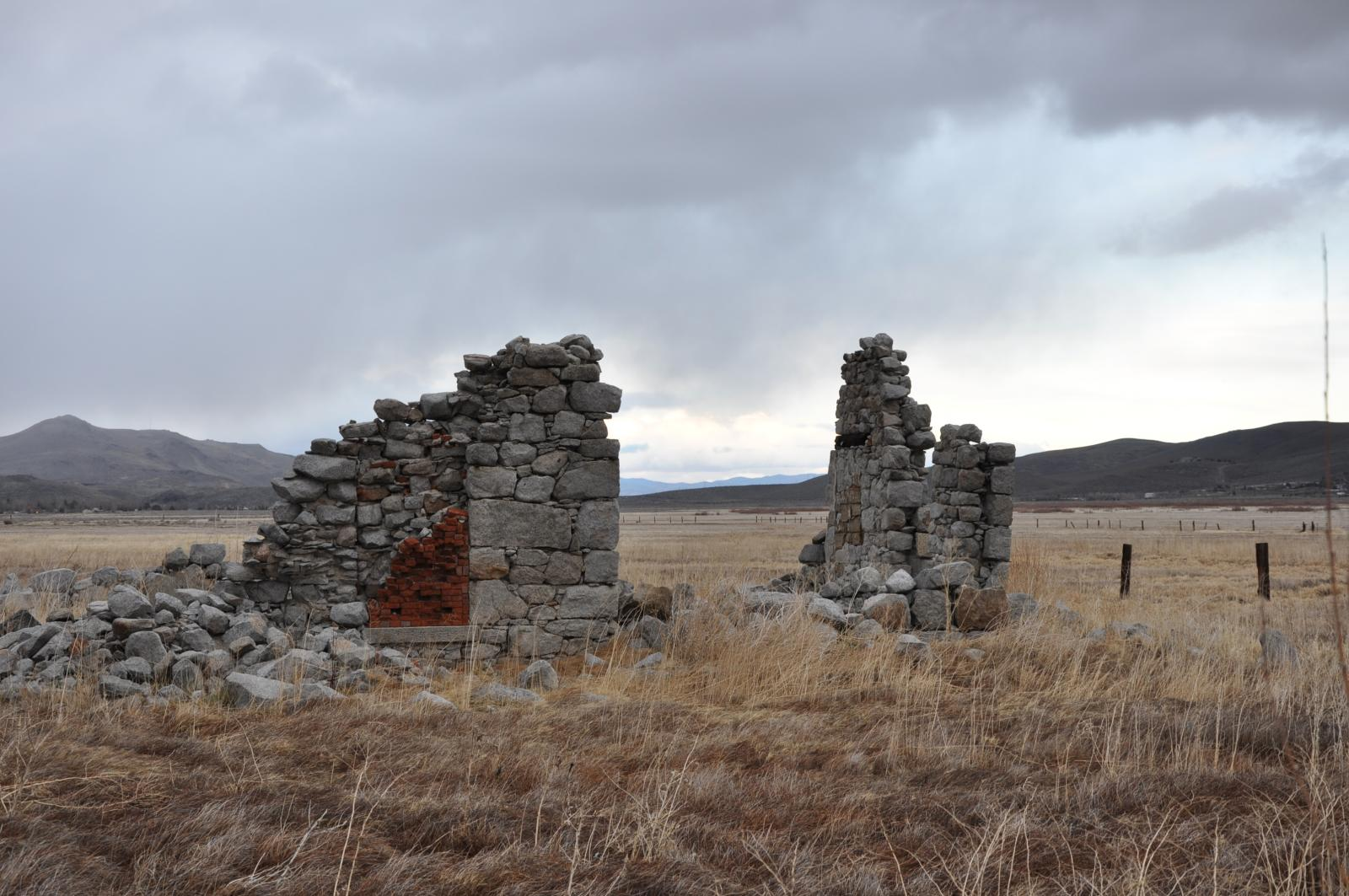
Ophir Mill ruins, Comstock Lode. The Ophir Mine is where Hearst made his first fortune, in 1859.

When his father died in 1846, Hearst at the age of 26 took over the support of his family: his mother, brother, and sister. In addition, he did some mining and ran a general store. He first heard of the discovery of gold in California in 1849. Before deciding to depart, he read further news on the subject to make sure it was true. In 1850, as a member of a party of 16, he left for California.

He and his party first tried placer mining in the vicinity of Sutter's Mill on the American River. After spending a cold winter and making meager findings, they moved to Grass Valley in 1851 on the news of a new lode. Hearst switched to prospecting and dealing in quartz mines. After almost ten years, Hearst was making a decent living as a prospector, and otherwise engaged in running a general store, mining, raising livestock and farming in Nevada County.

In the summer of 1859, Hearst learned of promising silver assays of the "blue stuff" someone had picked up in Utah Territory (near what was to become the Comstock Lode) and had assayed in Nevada County, California. Hearst hurried to the Washoe district of western Utah Territory, where he arranged to buy a one-sixth interest in the Ophir Mine there, near present-day Virginia City. That winter, Hearst and his partners mined 38 tons of high-grade silver ore, packed it across the Sierra on muleback, had it smelted in San Francisco, and made $91,000 profit (or roughly $3,300,000 in 2023 dollars). People who saw the bars of Ophir silver in San Francisco rushed to Washoe.

Hearst knew Marcus Daly from their Comstock Lode work. In the summer of 1872, Daly suggested the potential of the Ontario silver mine in Park City, Utah. The Ontario carried Hearst through the Panic of 1873 and produced $17 million in 10 years. Hearst, Haggin and Tevis later financed Daly to operate his Anaconda mine in Butte, Montana, and acquired an interest in that mine as well.

== Investments ==
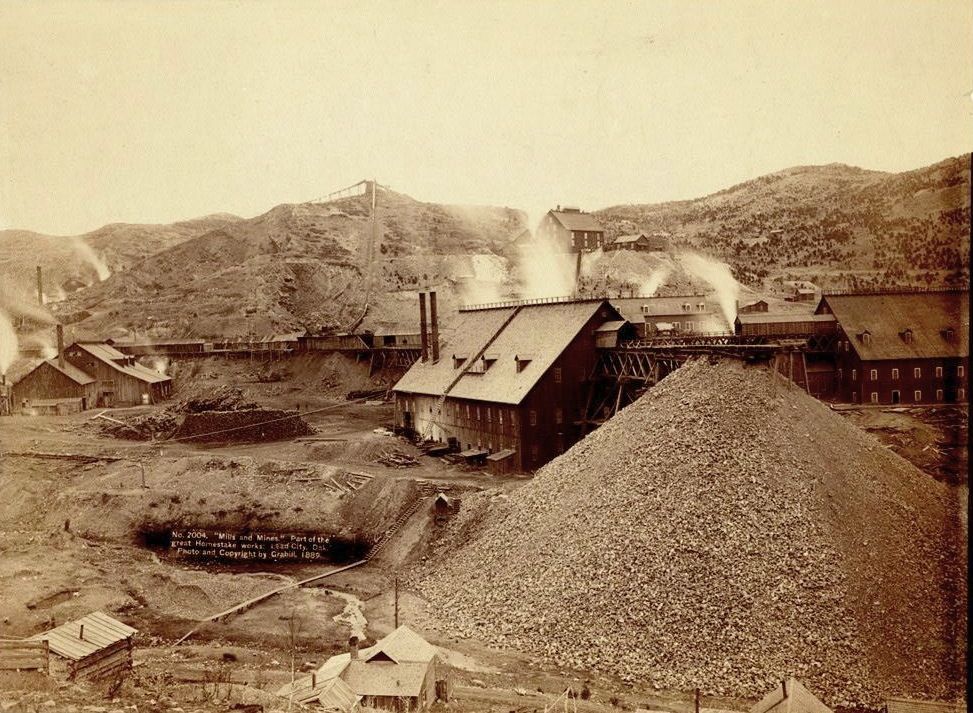
Homestake mines and mills in 1889

With other mining investors, Hearst set up Hearst, Haggin, Tevis and Co., in which he was a partner. He had interests in the Comstock Lode and the Ophir mine in Nevada, the Ontario silver mine in Utah, the Pacific mine in Pinos Altos, New Mexico, the Homestake gold mine in South Dakota, and the Anaconda Copper Mine in Montana. The Homestake Mine was one of his biggest investments. Although the gold ore was lean, the massive deposit supported an active mine until 2001. Hearst later invested in the Cerro de Pasco Mine in Peru. His company grew to be the largest private mining firm in the United States. Hearst acquired the reputation of being the most expert prospector and judge of mining property on the Pacific coast. He contributed to the development of the modern processes of quartz and other kinds of mining.

George Hearst acquired the San Francisco Examiner newspaper as a sign of loyalty to his friends by accepting it as payment for a gambling debt owed to him. He primarily used the Examiner to promote the interests of the Democratic Party and to laud the party's initiatives, especially when they were under public attack. His son William Randolph Hearst insisted on taking control of this holding of his father. The younger Hearst made the Examiner the foundation of what became his Hearst publishing empire.

== Personal and political life ==
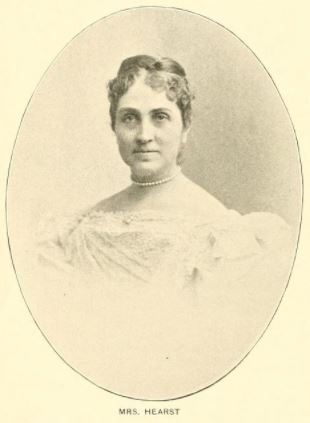
Phoebe Apperson Hearst in 1895

While building his mining career, George Hearst had supported his family in Missouri. In 1860, he returned to the state to care for his ailing mother and take care of some legal disputes. During this time, he became reacquainted with Phoebe Apperson, a neighbor of 18. The 42-year-old Hearst married her two years later, on June 15, 1862.

In the same year, Hearst and his new bride moved to San Francisco. Phoebe gave birth to their only child, William Randolph Hearst, on April 29, 1863.

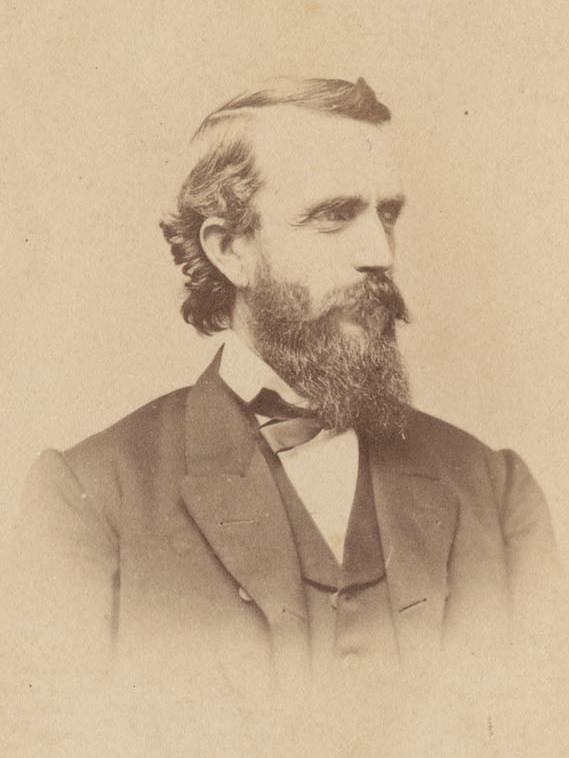
Hearst c. 1860

Hearst was elected to the California State Assembly in 1864, serving one term from 1865 until 1866. He was one of 12 members representing San Francisco. His knowledge of mines and the mining industry proved valuable, and he was selected for a special Committee on Mines and Mining Interests. During this time (1865) he acquired Rancho Piedra Blanca at San Simeon, California. He later bought parts of adjoining ranchos. This land was later developed by his son as the Hearst Castle. The Hearsts also maintained a townhome in San Francisco at the corner of Chestnut and Leavenworth.

Hearst owned a thoroughbred horse racing stable. One of his better-known horses was Tournament which won the Jerome Handicap. Following Hearst's death, Tournament was bought by Foxhall P. Keene, when the Hearst stable was auctioned at a dispersal sale on May 14, 1891.

Hearst ran unsuccessfully in 1882 as the Democratic candidate for Governor of California. Until this point, Hearst had a political relationship with Central Pacific Railroad. However, when the railroad's leadership backed the other Democratic nominee in the primary, Hearst joined Christopher Augustine Buckley and Stephen M. White in developing the Anti-Monopoly Coalition.

== Senatorial career ==
Hearst was a candidate for U.S. Senate in 1885, but lost to former Governor Leland Stanford. The next year, Hearst was appointed to fill the vacancy caused by the death of John F. Miller, and served from March 23, 1886, to August 4, 1886, when Abram Williams was elected. In 1887, he was elected in the regular election that year by the state legislature to the Senate as a Democrat, serving from March 4, 1887, until his death in 1891. As a Senator, Hearst focused on reducing Central Pacific's power in American commerce.

== Death and legacy ==
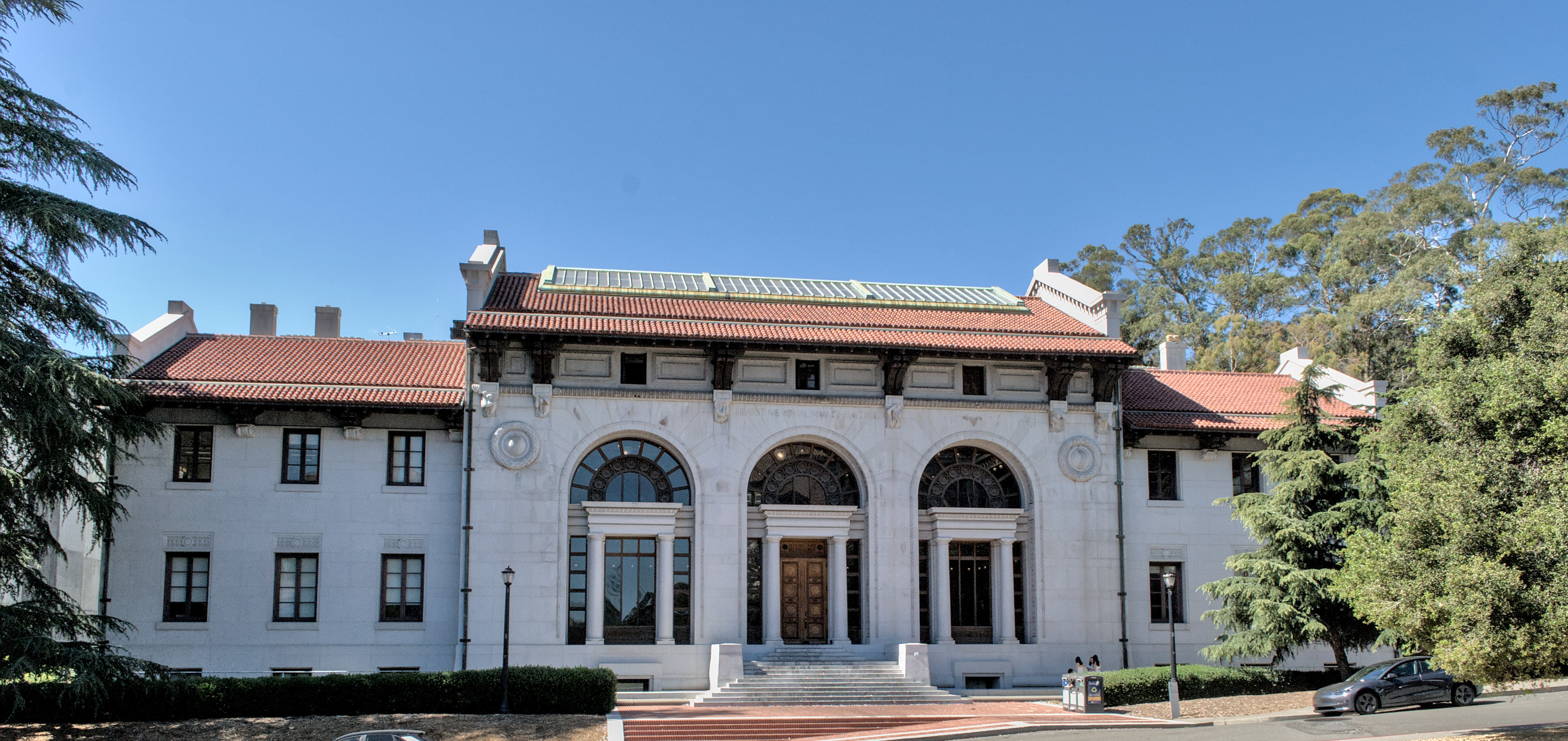
Hearst Memorial Mining Building at UC Berkeley. 2022 photo.

Hearst died at the age of 70 in Washington, D.C., on February 28, 1891. The California Legislature and state courts adjourned so officials could attend his funeral. When Phoebe Apperson Hearst inherited her husband's wealth, she donated a small amount to fund new libraries in the two communities where Hearst had an outsized mining influence: Lead, South Dakota, and Anaconda, Montana. She went on to promote a significant number of educational initiatives in California and was the first woman to serve on the California Board of Regents. Hearst is buried in Cypress Lawn Cemetery in Colma, California. His widow and son were later buried there as well.

The Hearst Memorial Mining Building on the Berkeley campus is dedicated to George Hearst.

In 1996, he was inducted into the Hall of Great Westerners of the National Cowboy & Western Heritage Museum.

== In popular culture ==
- In Sir Arthur Conan Doyle's short story "The Problem of Thor Bridge", Sherlock Holmes's client is Neil Gibson, described as "The Gold King" and as a senator from "some western state," indicating that Conan Doyle was modeling the character on Hearst. Ironically, in its first American publication, the story appeared in Hearst's International Magazine, a publication of Hearst's son, William Randolph Hearst.
- Moroni Olsen portrayed Hearst in the 1938 film Gold Is Where You Find It.
- In the 1941 film Citizen Kane, Harry Shannon played a fictionalized George Hearst, Jim Kane, the father of Charles Foster Kane, the lead character based upon William Randolph Hearst.
- The actor Barry Kelley portrayed Hearst in the 1964 episode "The Paper Dynasty" of the syndicated western television series Death Valley Days, hosted by Stanley Andrews. James Hampton played William Randolph Hearst and James Lanphier (1920–1969) played Ambrose Bierce.
- Gerald McRaney portrayed a fictionalized version of Hearst, depicted as a villain on the HBO television series Deadwood, set in South Dakota. McRaney reprised his role in 2019's Deadwood: The Movie. This time, Hearst returns to Deadwood 10 years after the events of the third season and is now a senator but still the main villain. The crimes committed by the fictional character take significant artistic license with those attributed to the real personage of Hearst at the Homestake Mine.

== See also ==
- Hearst family
- List of members of the United States Congress who died in office (1790–1899)
- List of people associated with the California Gold Rush

California Assembly
Preceded by Twelve members	California State Assemblyman, 8th District (San Francisco seat); 1865-1867 (with eleven others)	Succeeded by Twelve members
U.S. Senate
Preceded by John F. Miller	U.S. senator (Class 1) from California; 1886; Served alongside: Leland Stanford	Succeeded by Abram P. Williams
Preceded by Abram P. Williams	U.S. senator (Class 1) from California; 1887–1891; Served alongside: Leland Stanford	Succeeded by Charles N. Felton
