= New Portland, Maine =

Town in Maine, United States

- Town
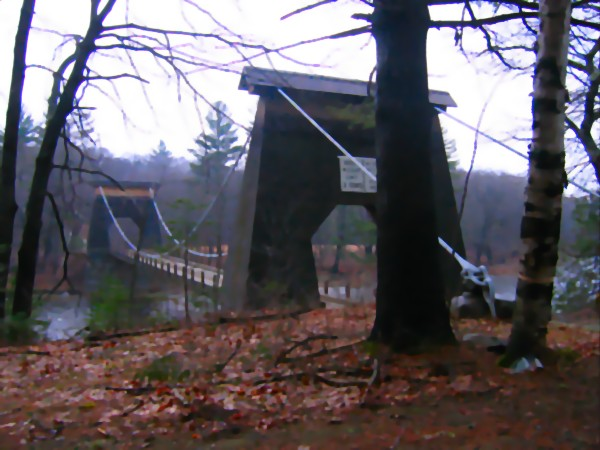
- The Wire Bridge in New Portland

- Location within Maine Location within the United States
- Coordinates: 44°53′05″N 70°04′21″W
- Country: United States
- State: Maine
- County: Somerset

Area
  - Total: 44.23 sq mi (114.56 km^{2})
  - Land: 43.88 sq mi (113.65 km^{2})
  - Water: 0.35 sq mi (0.91 km^{2})
- Elevation: 535 ft (163 m)

Population (2020)
  - Total: 765
  - Density: 17/sq mi (6.7/km^{2})
- Time zone: UTC-5 (Eastern (EST))
  - Summer (DST): UTC-4 (EDT)
- ZIP Codes: 04954, 04961
- Area code: 207
- FIPS code: 23-49205
- GNIS feature ID: 582622
- Website: newportlandmaine.org

New Portland is a town in Somerset County, Maine, United States. It is perhaps best known for its Wire Bridge, a cable suspension bridge completed in 1866 that is the last remaining bridge of its type in Maine, and possibly the U.S. Much of North New Portland's Main Street burned to the ground in the fire of 1919, including a hotel. The annual town fair draws large crowds from around, and is held in September. The population was 765 at the 2020 census. The town was given to the residents of Falmouth (now Portland) by the Massachusetts legislature to repay them for their loss when the British fleet burned Falmouth in 1775.

== Geography ==
According to the United States Census Bureau, the town has a total area of 44.23 square miles (114.56 km^{2}), of which 43.88 square miles (113.65 km^{2}) is land and 0.35 square miles (0.91 km^{2}) is water. The town is situated on Route 27, adjacent to Kingfield and a short drive to the popular Sugarloaf ski resort. The Carrabassett River flows through the West New Portland village and East New Portland village, whereas the Gilman Stream flows through the North New Portland village. The Carrabassett River is rocky and in places swift, whereas Gilman Stream is a slower river, amenable to kayaking and canoeing.

== Demographics ==
Historical population
| Census | Pop. | Note | %± |
|---|---|---|---|
| 1810 | 421 | | — |
| 1820 | 817 | | 94.1% |
| 1830 | 1,214 | | 48.6% |
| 1840 | 1,620 | | 33.4% |
| 1850 | 1,460 | | −9.9% |
| 1860 | 1,554 | | 6.4% |
| 1870 | 1,454 | | −6.4% |
| 1880 | 1,271 | | −12.6% |
| 1890 | 1,034 | | −18.6% |
| 1900 | 913 | | −11.7% |
| 1910 | 882 | | −3.4% |
| 1920 | 840 | | −4.8% |
| 1930 | 818 | | −2.6% |
| 1940 | 765 | | −6.5% |
| 1950 | 733 | | −4.2% |
| 1960 | 620 | | −15.4% |
| 1970 | 559 | | −9.8% |
| 1980 | 651 | | 16.5% |
| 1990 | 789 | | 21.2% |
| 2000 | 785 | | −0.5% |
| 2010 | 718 | | −8.5% |
| 2020 | 765 | | 6.5% |
U.S. Decennial Census

=== 2010 census ===
As of the census of 2010, there were 718 people, 346 households, and 202 families living in the town. The population density was 16.4 inhabitants per square mile (6.3/km^{2}). There were 605 housing units at an average density of 13.8 per square mile (5.3/km^{2}). The racial makeup of the town was 98.2% White, 0.1% African American, 0.6% Native American, 0.1% Asian, and 1.0% from two or more races. Hispanic or Latino of any race were 0.3% of the population.

There were 346 households, of which 20.2% had children under the age of 18 living with them, 49.1% were married couples living together, 4.6% had a female householder with no husband present, 4.6% had a male householder with no wife present, and 41.6% were non-families. 31.8% of all households were made up of individuals, and 11.8% had someone living alone who was 65 years of age or older. The average household size was 2.08 and the average family size was 2.58.

The median age in the town was 48.9 years. 16.6% of residents were under the age of 18; 4.7% were between the ages of 18 and 24; 22.3% were from 25 to 44; 38.2% were from 45 to 64; and 18.1% were 65 years of age or older. The gender makeup of the town was 52.2% male and 47.8% female.

=== 2000 census ===
As of the census of 2000, there were 785 people, 329 households, and 227 families living in the town. The population density was 18.1 people per square mile (7.0/km^{2}). There were 564 housing units at an average density of 13.0 per square mile (5.0/km^{2}). The racial makeup of the town was 98.34% White, 1.27% Native American, 0.13% from other races, and 0.25% from two or more races. Hispanic or Latino of any race were 0.38% of the population.

There were 329 households, out of which 29.5% had children under the age of 18 living with them, 58.4% were married couples living together, 7.0% had a female householder with no husband present, and 30.7% were non-families. 23.7% of all households were made up of individuals, and 10.0% had someone living alone who was 65 years of age or older. The average household size was 2.39 and the average family size was 2.77.

In the town, the population was spread out, with 22.7% under the age of 18, 5.7% from 18 to 24, 26.8% from 25 to 44, 29.4% from 45 to 64, and 15.4% who were 65 years of age or older. The median age was 42 years. For every 100 females, there were 101.3 males. For every 100 females age 18 and over, there were 96.4 males.

The median income for a household in the town was $30,521, and the median income for a family was $35,284. Males had a median income of $26,354 versus $17,014 for females. The per capita income for the town was $14,596. About 8.3% of families and 11.6% of the population were below the poverty line, including 22.2% of those under age 18 and 2.3% of those age 65 or over.

== Notable people ==
- Joseph T. Copeland, Justice of the Michigan Supreme Court and general in the Union Army.
- Peter Percival Elder, politician, businessman, and newspaperman.
- Geoffrey Shovelton, tenor opera singer and illustrator.
- Abram P. Williams, teacher, businessman, and US senator from California.
- Orrin J. Williams (1844–1913), businessman, mayor of New Richmond, Wisconsin
