= Orrin J. Williams =

American politician

Orrin James Williams (March 14, 1844 – June 20, 1913) was an American politician and businessman.

== Biography ==
Williams was born in New Portland, Somerset County, Maine, on March 14, 1844. He was a hardware merchant by trade. Williams died in New Richmond, Wisconsin on June 20, 1913. Williams was a member of the Wisconsin State during the 1893 and 1895 sessions and was a Republican. Additionally, he was President of the Common Council and Mayor of New Richmond. He was a Republican.
