= Patrick S. Casserly =

Irish scholar and educator (1792–1847)

Patrick Sarsfield Casserly
- Born: 1792; Mullingar, County Westmeath, Ireland
- Died: 30 April 1847 (aged 55); New York City, New York, U.S.
- Children: Patrick Sarsfield Casserly, Jr. (died 14 Oct 1850), Eugene Casserly, George W. Casserly

Patrick Sarsfield Casserly (1792 – 30 April 1847) was an Irish scholar, editor and educator.

== Biography ==
Casserly was born in Mullingar, County Westmeath, Ireland, to Patrick Casserly and Elizabeth Horan. His family was a branch of the O'Connors. He emigrated to the United States in 1824, settling in New York City, where he became one of the first Roman Catholic educators.

He was associate editor of the New York Weekly Register. He translated the "Sublime and Beautiful" of Longinus, and "Of the Little Garden of Roses and Valley of Lillies" of Thomas à Kempis; edited Jacob's Greek Reader (1836), of which sixteen editions were published, and a textbook on Latin Prosody (1845), which is still extensively used in classical schools, and wrote and published a pamphlet entitled New England Critics and New York Editors, in reply to an article in the North American Review on the merits of certain Greek textbooks.

He was the father of U.S. Senator Eugene Casserly.

Casserly died at his home in New York City after a brief illness.
