= Abram Williams =

American politician (1832–1911)

Abram P. Williams
- Williams c. 1901

United States Senator from California
- In office August 4, 1886 – March 3, 1887
- Preceded by: George Hearst
- Succeeded by: George Hearst

Personal details
- Born: February 3, 1832 New Portland, Maine, U.S.
- Died: October 17, 1911 (aged 79) San Francisco, California, U.S.
- Party: Republican
- Profession: Politician

Abram Pease Williams (February 3, 1832 – October 17, 1911) was an American businessman, politician and teacher who was a U.S. Senator from California from 1886 to 1887.

== Biography ==
Abram Pease Williams was born in New Portland, Maine on February 3, 1832. He attended the common schools of the time, and completed a course of study at North Anson Academy from 1846 to 1848.

He taught school at North Anson before moving to Fairfield, Maine, in 1853. There he engaged in the mercantile business. In 1858 Williams moved to California and worked in the mining fields in Tuolumne County. In 1859 he resumed his mercantile pursuits. He then moved to San Francisco in 1861 and became an importer, stock raiser, and farmer. Abram was one of the founders of the San Francisco Board of Trade, serving as its first president. He was also a member of the San Francisco Chamber of Commerce. In 1886 Williams was elected as a Republican to the United States Senate to fill the vacancy caused by the death of John F. Miller and served until March 3, 1887. He did not run for a renomination in 1887.

When he returned to California he resumed the wholesale mercantile business in San Francisco, where he died October 17, 1911. He was interred at the Maplewood Cemetery in Fairfield, Maine.

U.S. Senate
Preceded by George Hearst	U.S. senator (Class 1) from California; 1886–1887; Served alongside: Leland Stanford	Succeeded by George Hearst
