= Michael Casserly =

Irish hurler

Personal information
- Born: Cork, Ireland

Sport
- Sport: Hurling
- Position: Forward
Club
- Years: Club
- 1880s-1890s: Redmonds
Club titles
- Cork titles: 1
Inter-county
Years	County	Apps (scores)
1892	Cork	2
Inter-county titles
- Munster titles: 1
- All-Irelands: 1

Michael Casserly was an Irish sportsperson. He played hurling with his local club Redmonds and was a member of the Cork senior inter-county team for one season in 1892.

== Playing career ==
=== Club ===
Casserly played his club hurling with the famous Redmonds club and enjoyed some success. He won a county senior championship title in 1892.

=== Inter-county ===
Casserly first came to prominence on the inter-county scene with Cork as part of the Redmond's selection in 1892. That year he lined out in his first provincial decider with All-Ireland champions Kerry providing the opposition. An exciting game developed, however, at full-time Cork were the champions by 5-3 to 2-5. It was Casserly's first, and only, Munster title. Cork's next game was an All-Ireland final meeting with Dublin. The game was a controversial one as referee Dan Fraher changed his mind after initially awarding a goal to Cork. He eventually decided that the GAA's Central Council should decide the matter. Dublin, however, had walked off the field and, because of this, Cork were awarded the title. It gave Casserly an All-Ireland title.

== Sources ==
- Corry, Eoghan, The GAA Book of Lists (Hodder Headline Ireland, 2005).
- Cronin, Jim, A Rebel Hundred: Cork's 100 All-Ireland Titles.
- Donegan, Des, The Complete Handbook of Gaelic Games (DBA Publications Limited, 2005).
