= Eugene Casserly =

American politician (1820–1883)

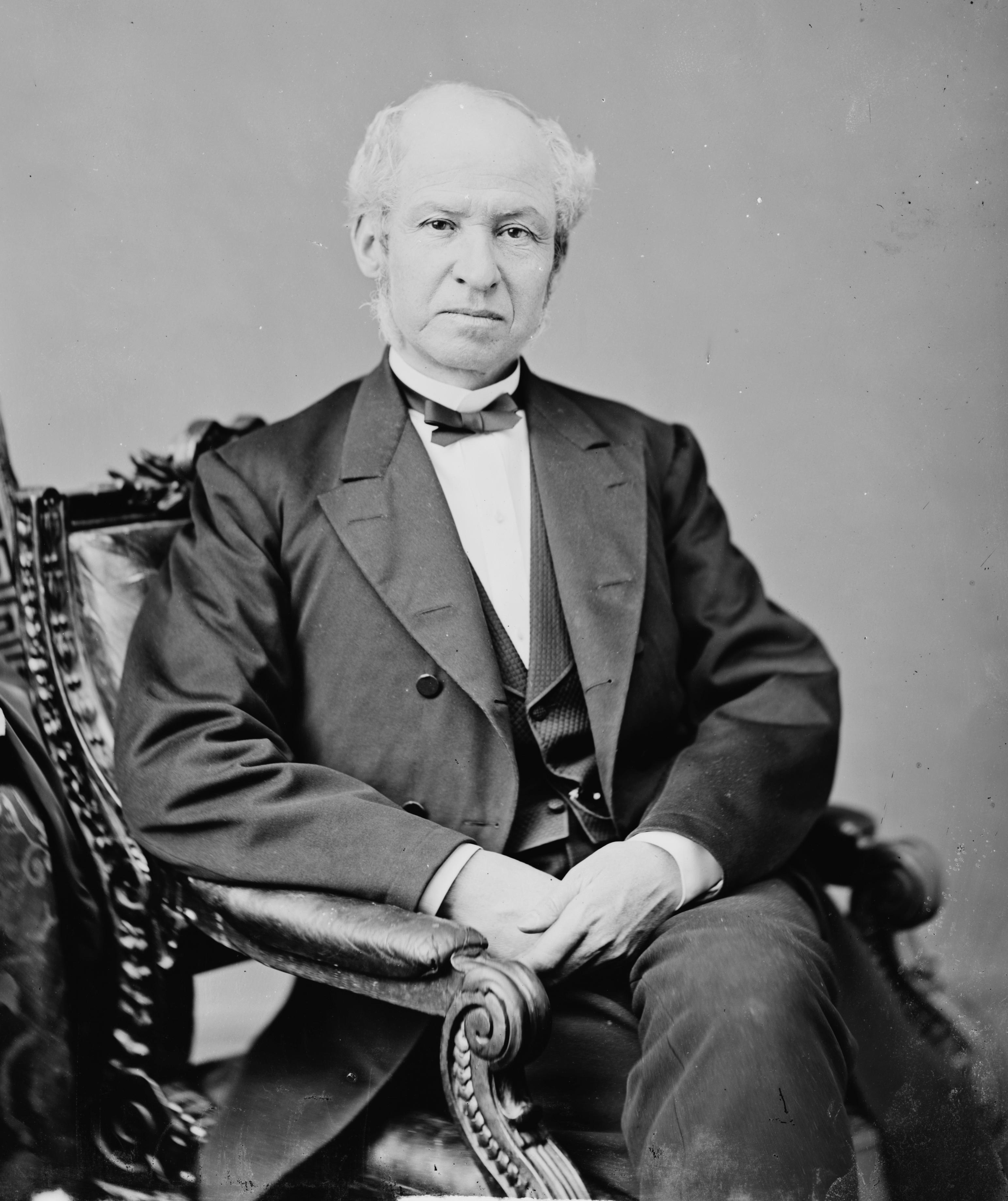

United States Senator from California
- In office March 4, 1869 – November 29, 1873
- Preceded by: John Conness
- Succeeded by: John S. Hager

Delegate to the Second Constitutional Convention of California
- In office September 28, 1878 – March 3, 1879
- Preceded by: Office established
- Succeeded by: Office abolished
- Constituency: 1st congressional district

Personal details
- Born: November 13, 1820 Mullingar, County Westmeath, Ireland
- Died: June 14, 1883 (aged 62) San Francisco, California, U.S.
- Party: Democratic

Eugene Casserly (November 13, 1820 – June 14, 1883) was an Irish-born American journalist, lawyer, and politician. He was the son of scholar Patrick S. Casserly, and he served in the United States Senate from California.

== Biography ==
Eugene Casserly was born on November 13, 1820, in Mullingar, County Westmeath, Ireland, and immigrated to the United States with his parents in 1822, settling in New York City. Casserly's father prepared him for a college education and he attended and graduated from Georgetown University in Washington, D.C. He subsequently studied law and was admitted to the bar in 1844 and began practicing in New York City. Casserly became editor of Freeman's Journal and contributed to several newspapers in various cities.

Before moving to San Francisco, California, in 1850, Casserly served on the New York City corporation counsel from 1846 to 1847. Upon moving to California, he published the Public Balance, the True Balance and the Standard, and was elected State printer in 1851 before retiring from journalism and resuming his law practice. In 1854, he married Teresa, daughter of deceased merchant John Doyle. Together, they had three children, two sons and a daughter.

Casserly was elected as a Democrat to the United States Senate in 1867, where he served from March 1869 until his resignation on November 29, 1873. In the U.S. Senate, he served as chairman of the Committee on Pacific Railroads during the 42nd Congress and the Committee on Engrossed Bills during the 42nd Congress and 43rd Congress.

After resigning from the United States Senate, Casserly resumed practicing law in San Francisco and served as a member of the California Constitutional Convention in 1878 and 1879. Casserly died in San Francisco on June 14, 1883, and was interred in Calvary Cemetery. He was subsequently re-interred in Holy Cross Cemetery in Colma, California, in 1904.

U.S. Senate
Preceded by John Conness	U.S. senator (Class 1) from California; 1869–1873; Served alongside: Cornelius Cole, Aaron A. Sargent	Succeeded by John S. Hager
