= 1890 California lieutenant gubernatorial election =

- November 4, 1890
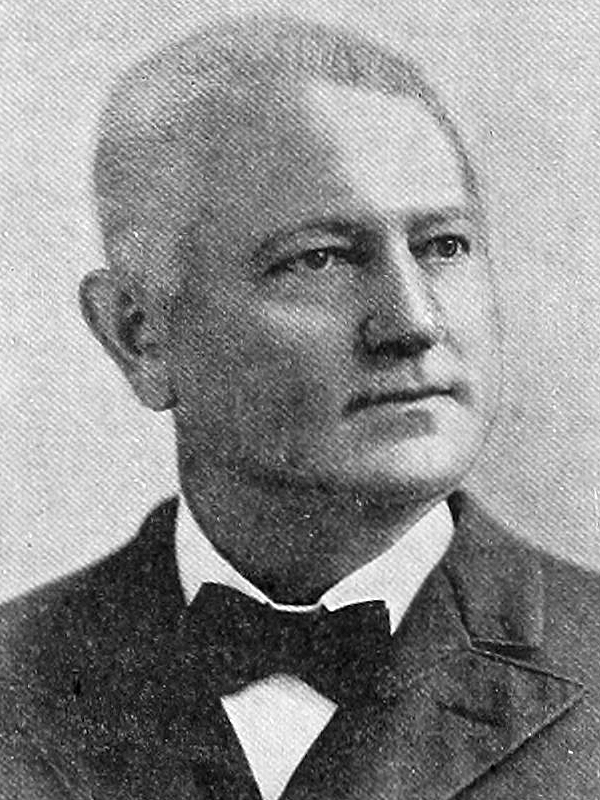

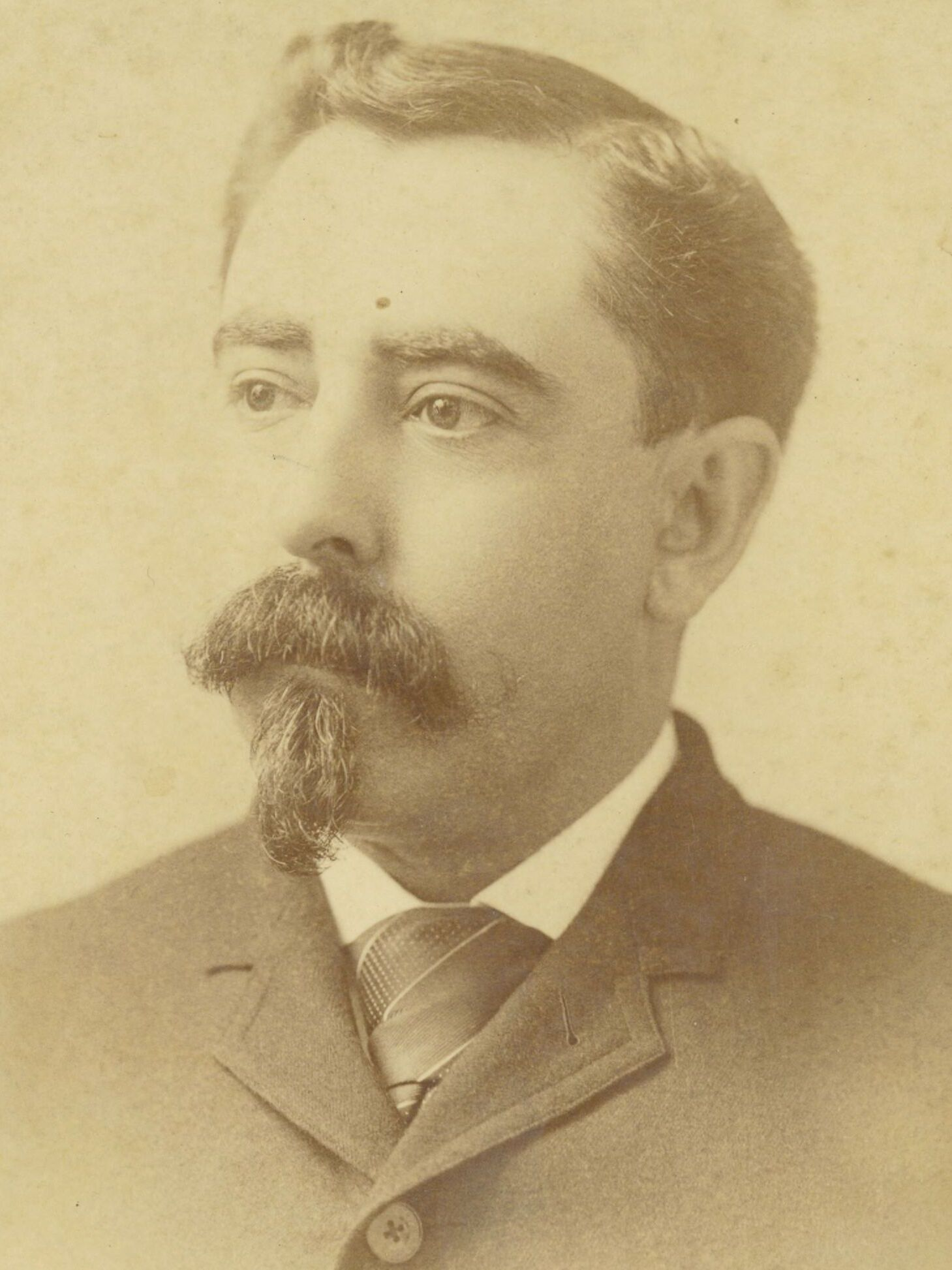
Nominee	John B. Reddick	R. F. del Valle
Party	Republican	Democratic
Popular vote	126,244	115,783
Percentage	50.05%	45.90%
- County results Reddick: 40–50% 50–60% 60–70% 70–80% del Valle: 40–50% 50–60% 60–70%
Lieutenant Governor before election
Stephen M. White
Democratic
Elected Lieutenant Governor
John B. Reddick
Republican

The 1890 California lieutenant gubernatorial election was held on November 4, 1890. Republican State Assemblyman John B. Reddick defeated Democratic State Senator Reginaldo Francisco del Valle with 50.05% of the vote.

== General election ==
=== Candidates ===
- John B. Reddick, Republican
- Reginaldo Francisco del Valle, Democratic
- A. M. Hough, Prohibition
- Ben Morgan, Know Nothing

=== Results ===
1890 California lieutenant gubernatorial election
Party	Candidate	Votes	%	±%
Republican	John B. Reddick	126,244	50.05%	
Democratic	R. F. del Valle	115,783	45.90%	
Prohibition	A. M. Hough	6,878	2.73%	
Know Nothing	Ben Morgan	3,342	1.33%	
Scattering		36	0.00%	
Majority		252,283		
Turnout				
Republican gain from Democratic		Swing		
