= William F. White =

Irish-born American politician, pioneer (1816–1890)

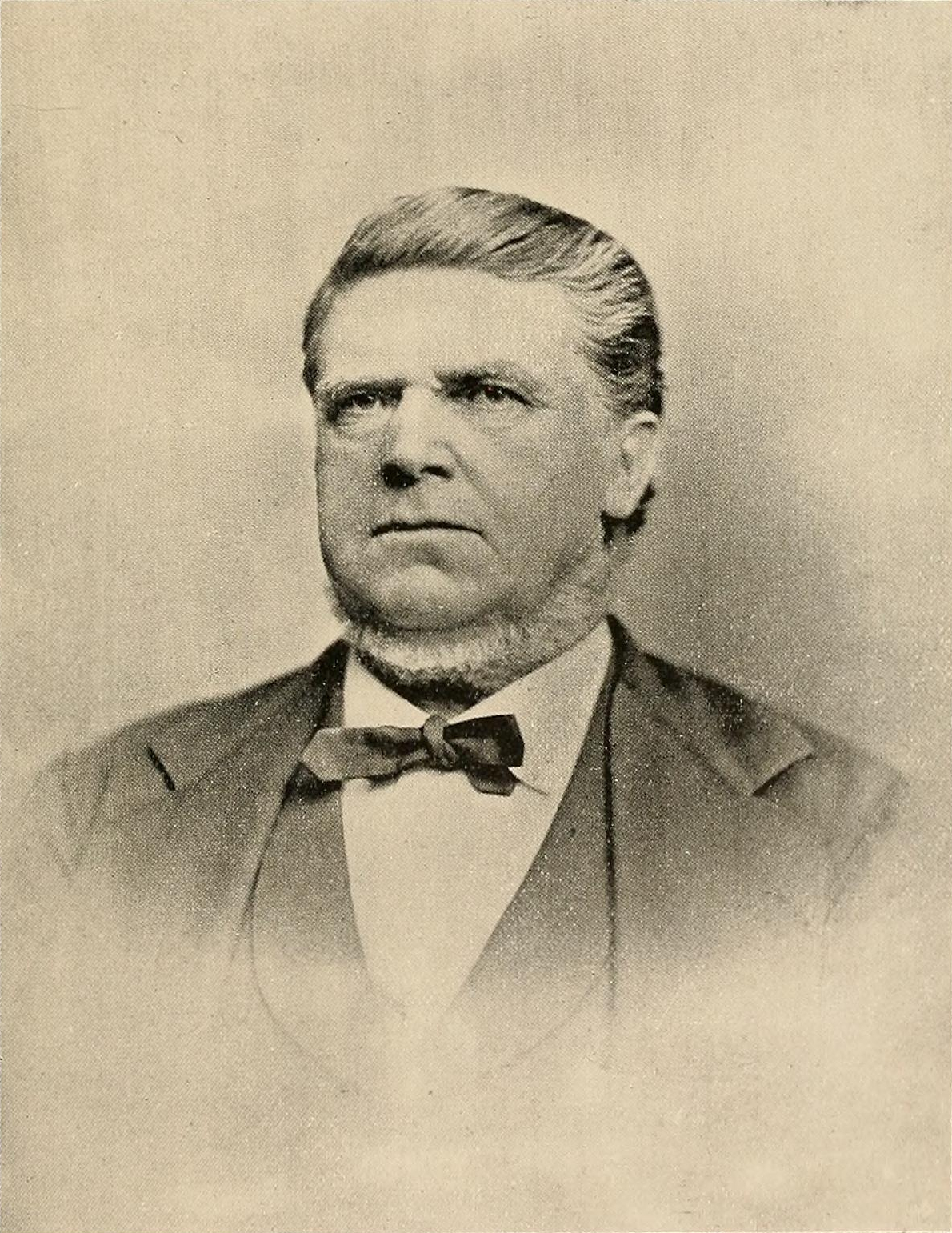

California Bank Commissioner
- In office November 1, 1879 – November 1, 1887
- Appointed by: William Irwin; George Stoneman
- Preceded by: James T. Murphy
- Succeeded by: James A. Thompson

Delegate to the Second Constitutional Convention of California
- In office September 28, 1878 – March 3, 1879
- Preceded by: Office established
- Succeeded by: Office abolished
- Constituency: Santa Cruz, Monterey, and San Benito

Personal details
- Born: William Francis White; 1816 County Limerick, Ireland
- Died: May 16, 1890 (aged 73–74) Oakland, California, U.S.
- Resting place: Pajaro Valley Memorial Park
- Party: Democratic
- Other political affiliations: Workingmen's (1878–1879)
- Spouse: Francis J. Russell (m. 1849)
- Children: 8, including Stephen
- Relatives: Gerald Griffin (uncle); Stephen Mallory (cousin-in-law)
- Education: Oxford Academy
- Occupation: Pioneer, merchant, farmer, author, politician

William Francis White (1816 – May 16, 1890) was an Irish American pioneer, merchant, farmer, author and politician who served two terms as a California Bank Commissioner from 1879 to 1887.

In 1878, he was elected a delegate to California's Second Constitutional Convention on the Workingmen's ticket, representing Santa Cruz, Monterey, and San Benito Counties. The next year, he was the party's nominee for Governor of California, coming in third place behind Democrat Hugh J. Glenn and Republican George Clement Perkins. After his loss, he was appointed a State Bank Commissioner by outgoing Governor William Irwin, serving in that position until 1887.

He was the father of U.S. Senator Stephen M. White.

== Caricature gallery ==
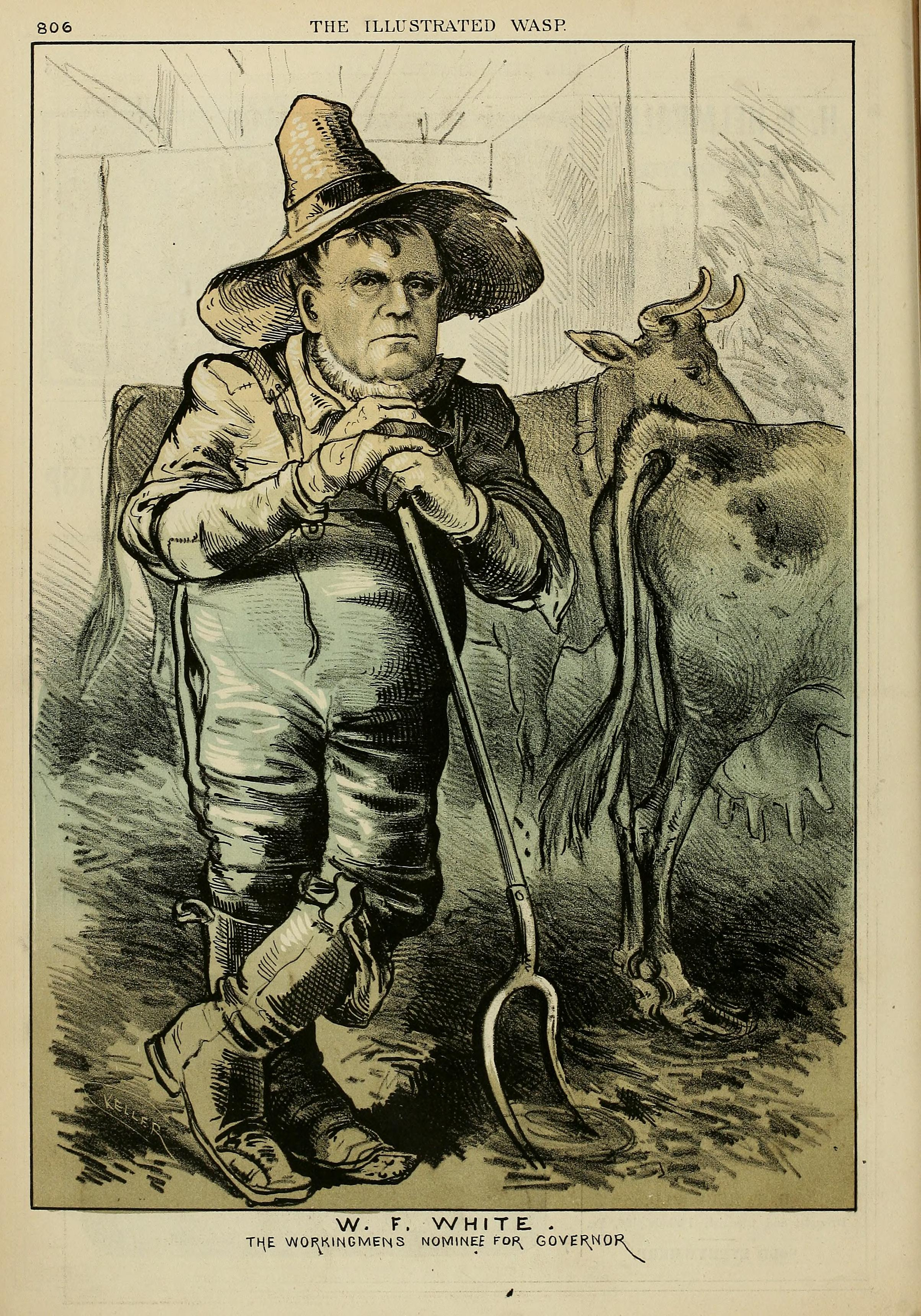
"W. F. White, the Workingmen's Nominee for Governor"

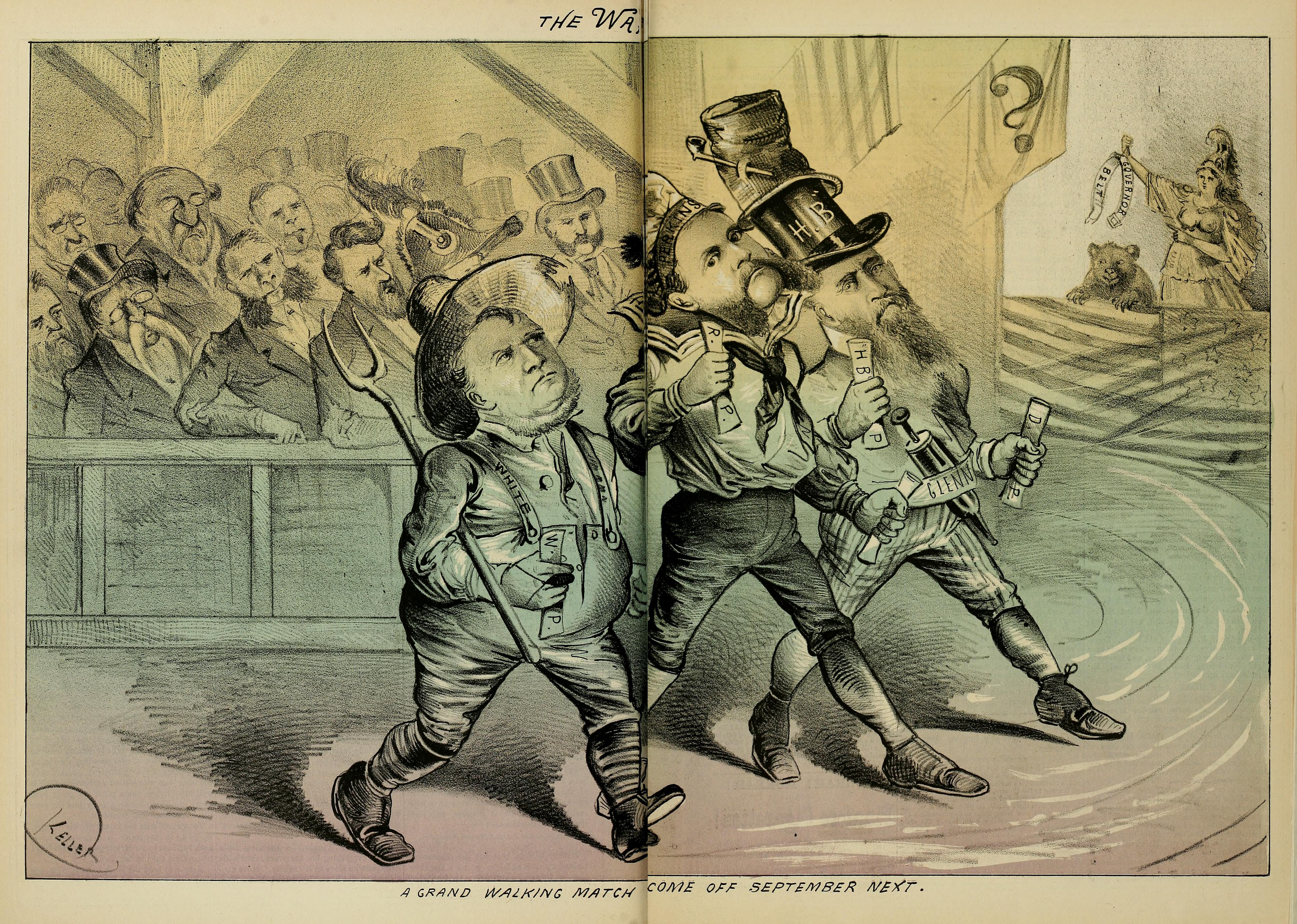
"A Grand Walking Match Come Off September Next"

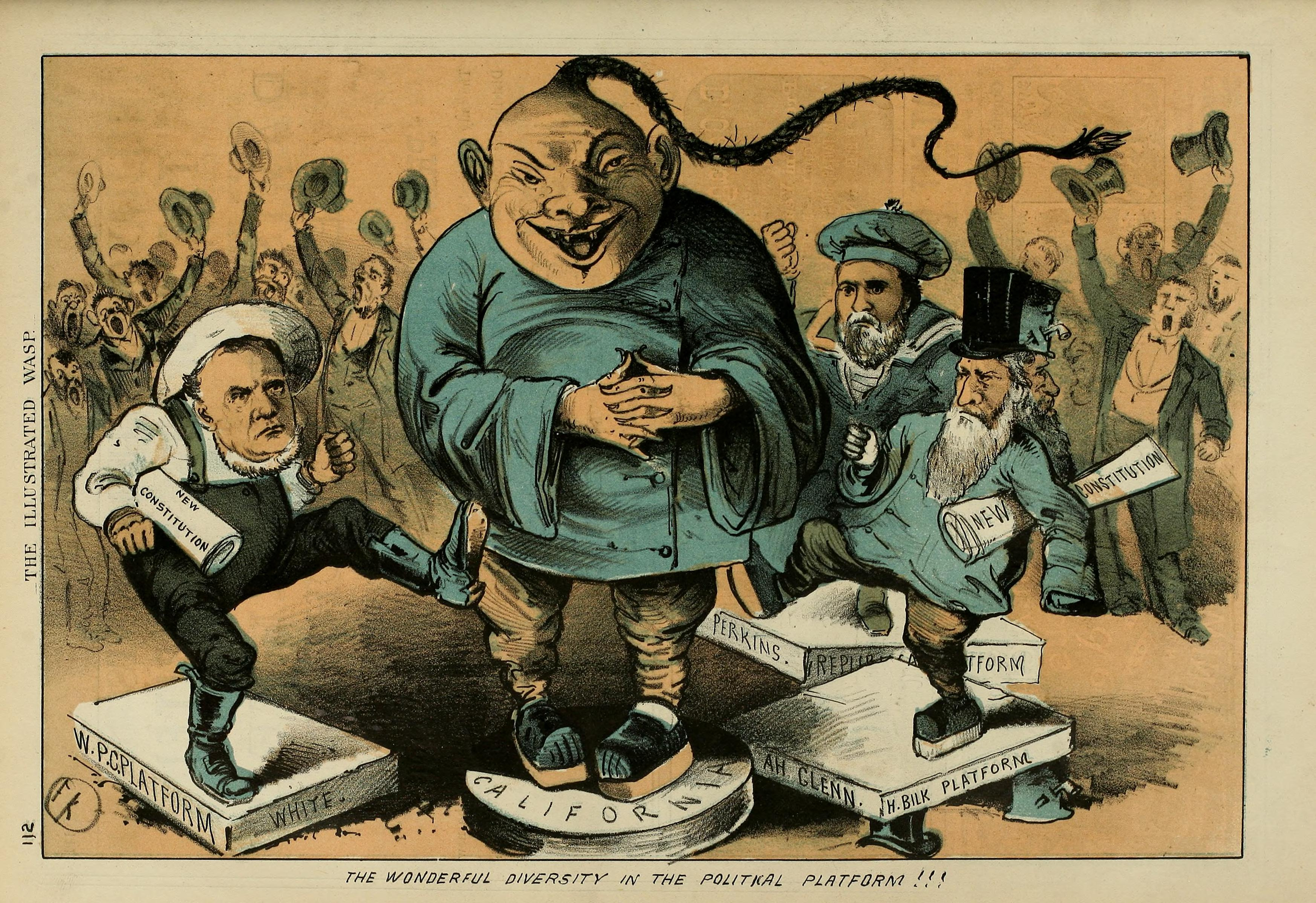
"The Wonderful Diversity in the Politkal Platform!!!"

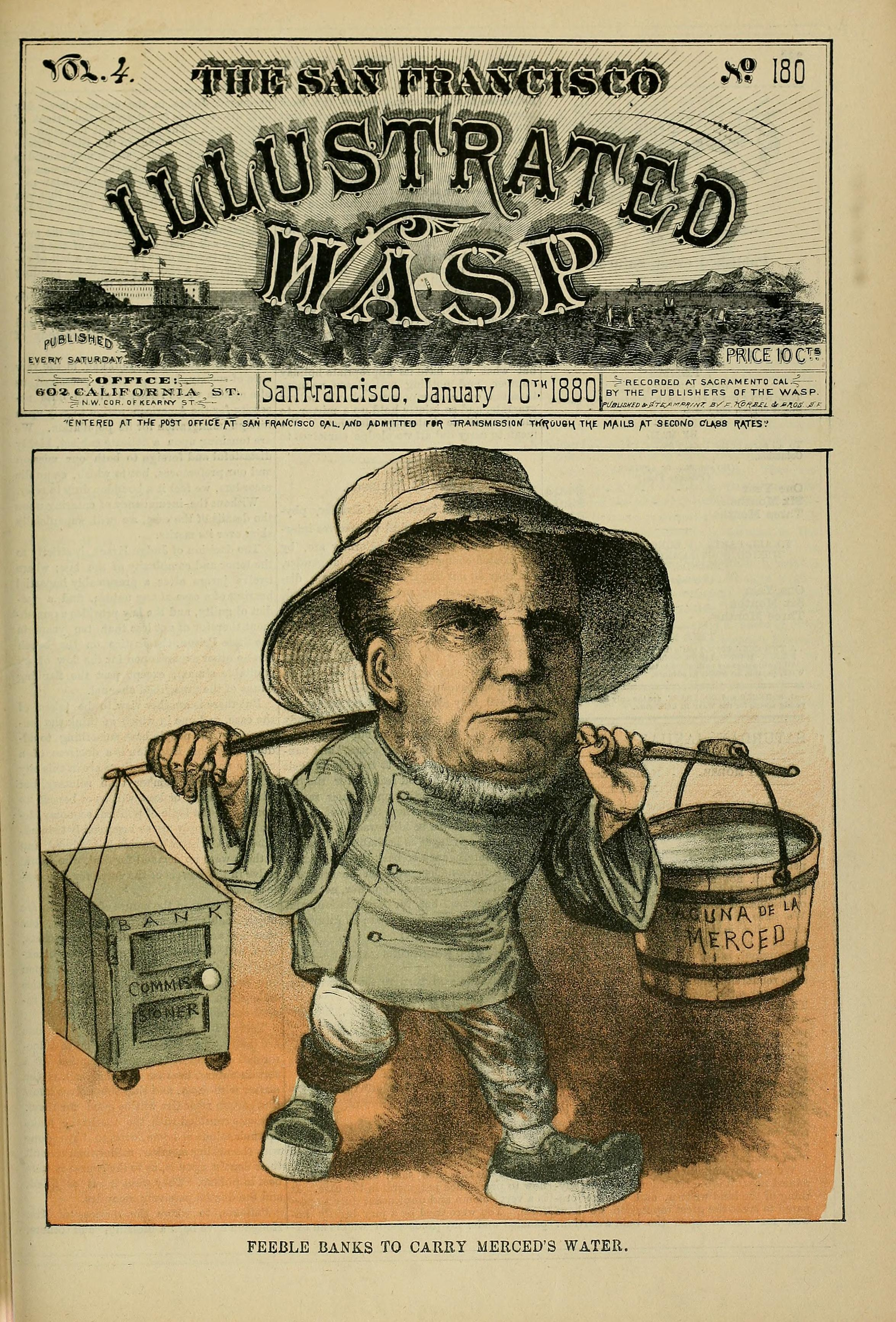
"Feeble Banks to Carry Merced's Water"
