= 1893 United States Senate election in California =

- January 19, 1893

Majority vote of both houses needed to win
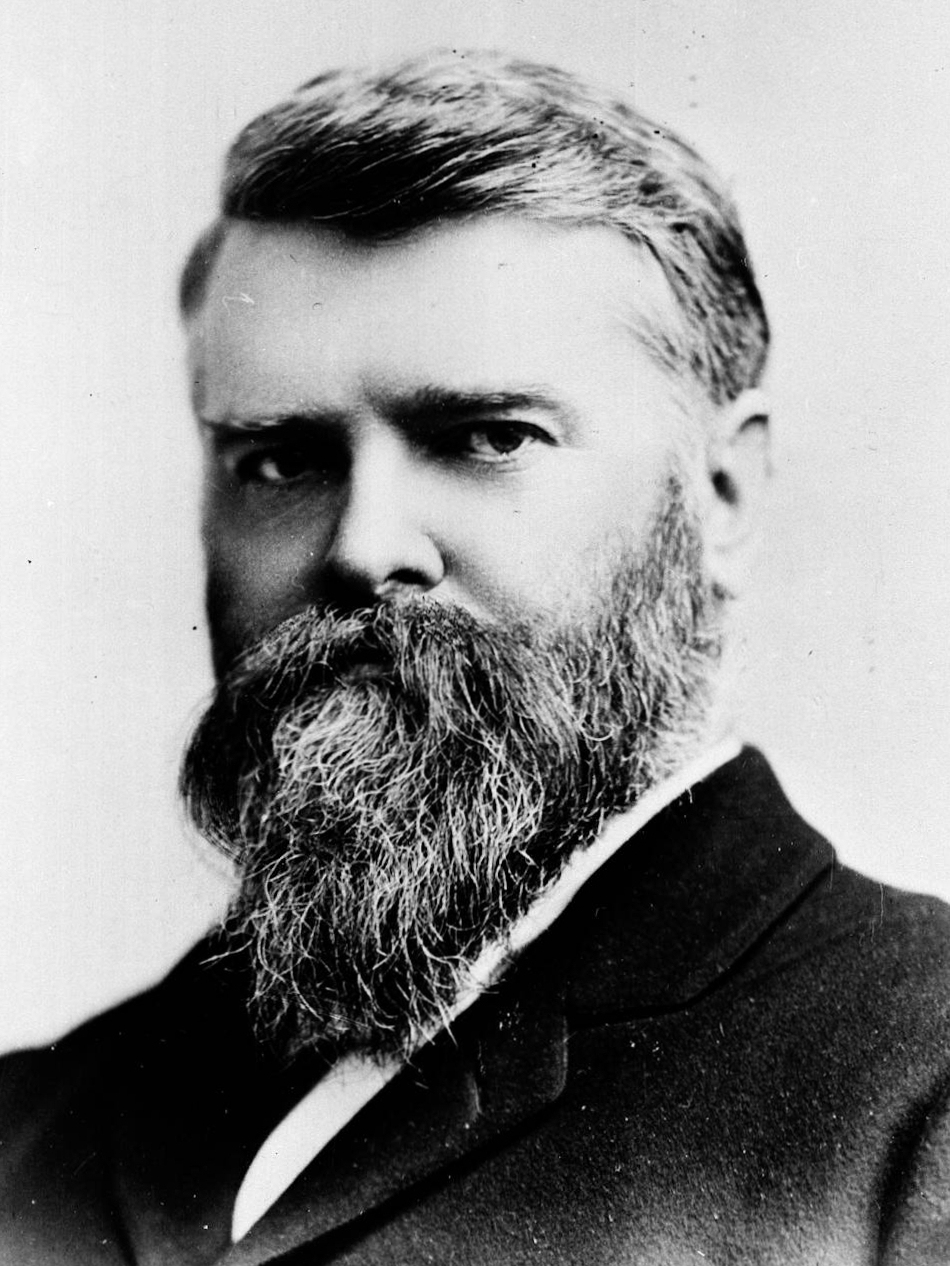

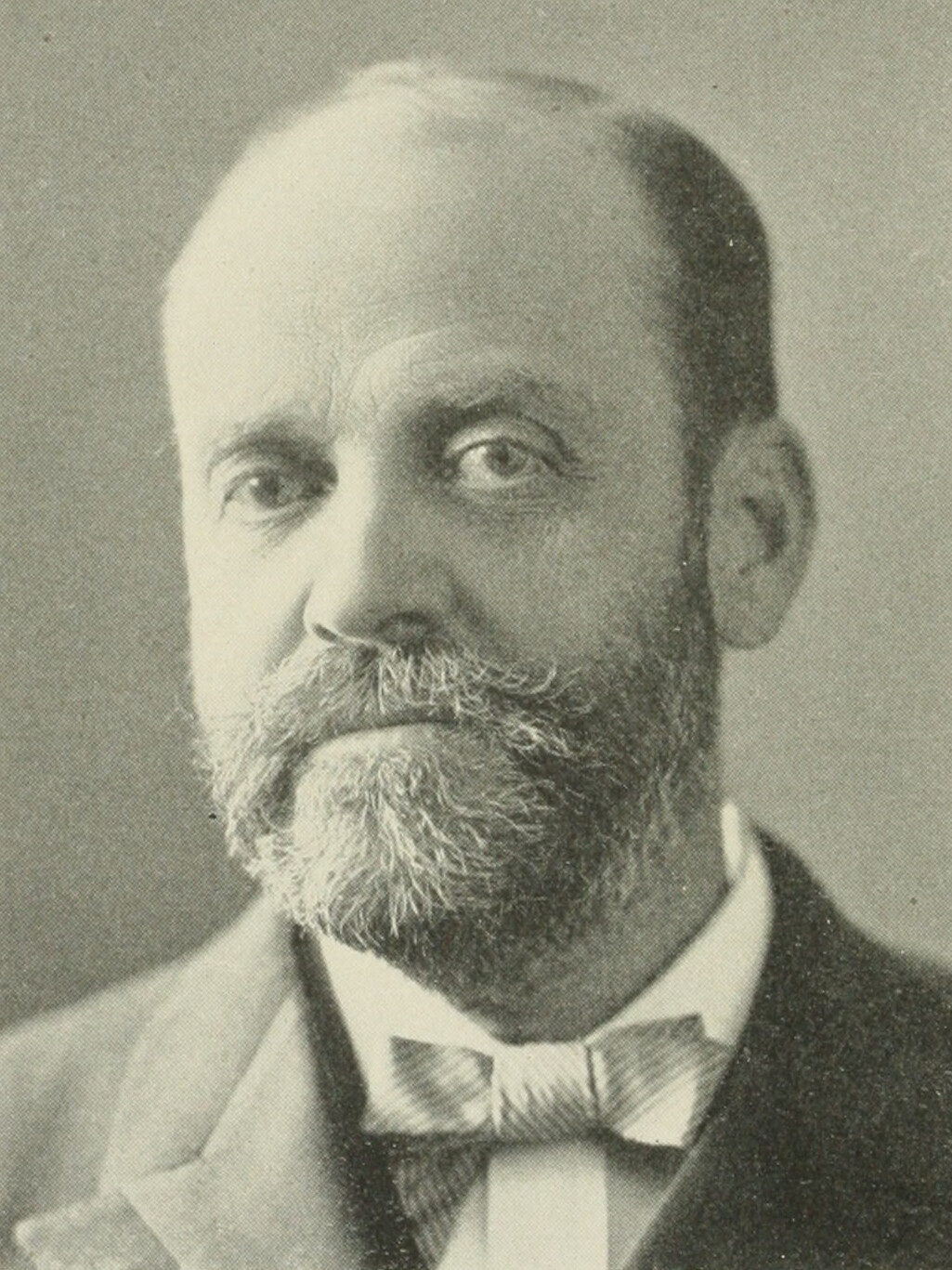

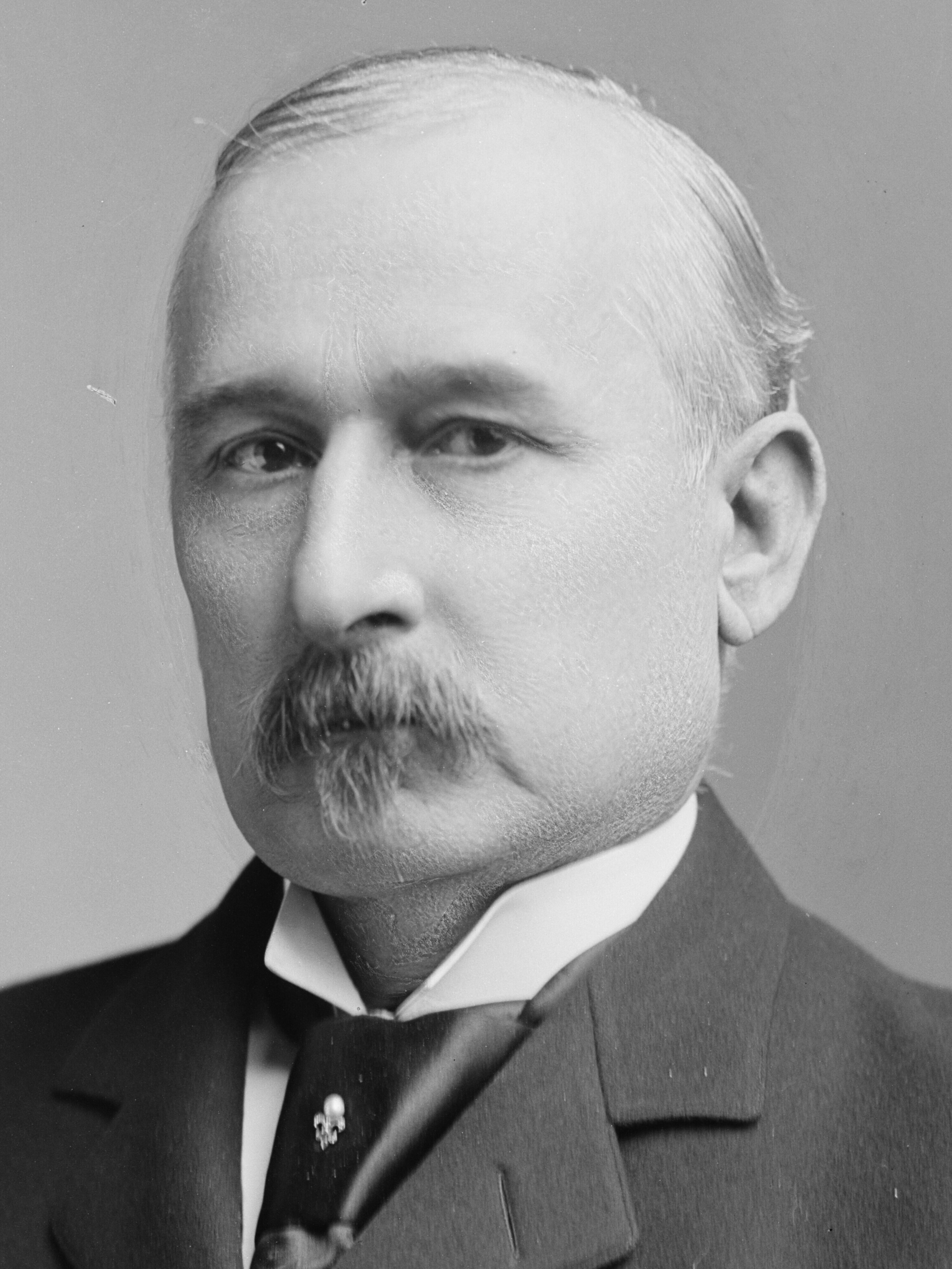

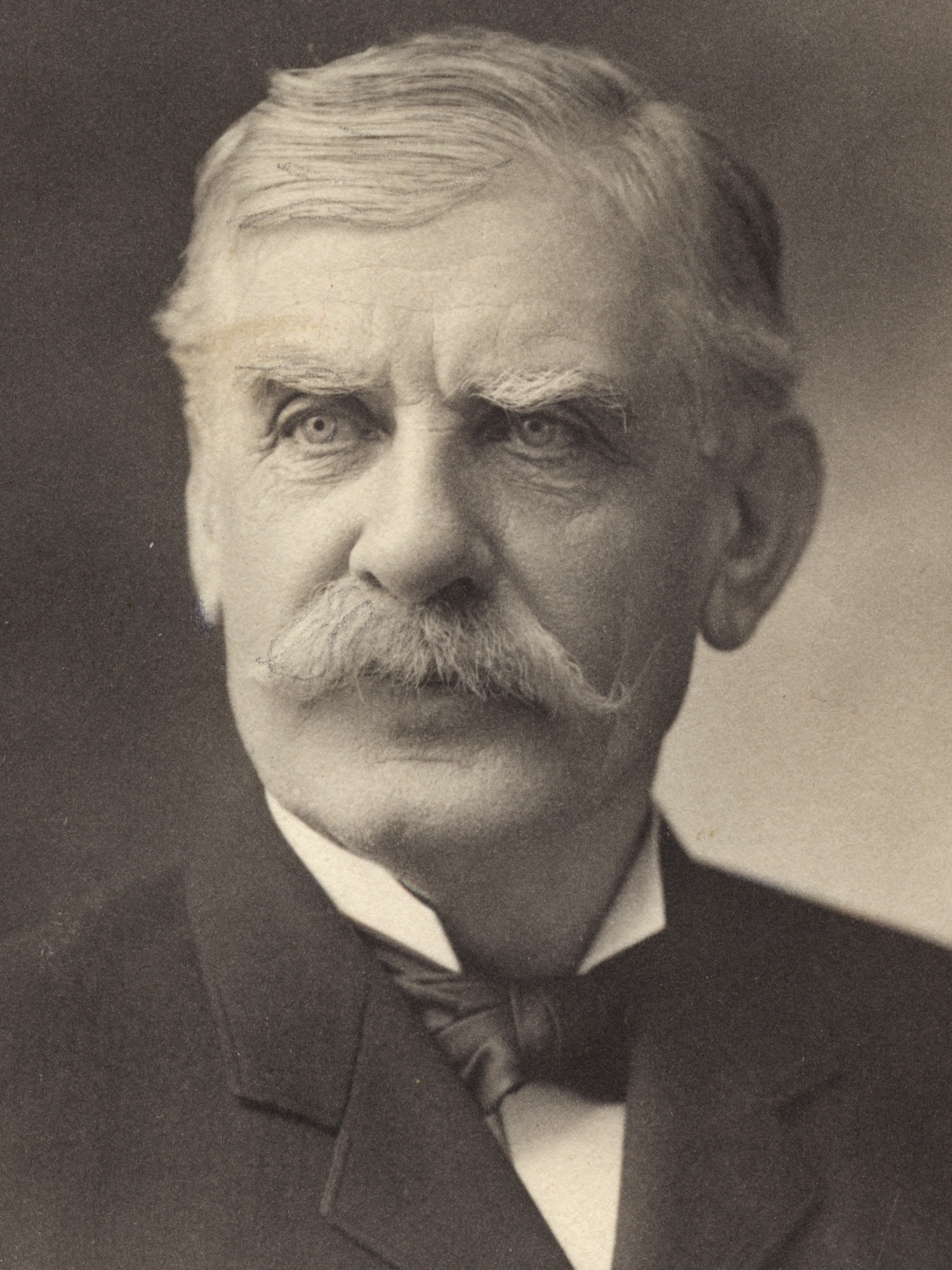

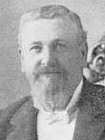

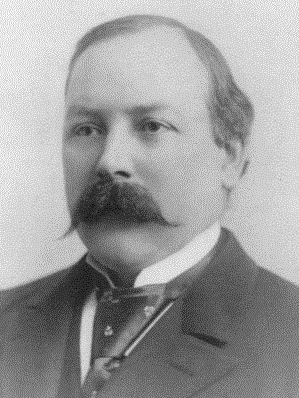

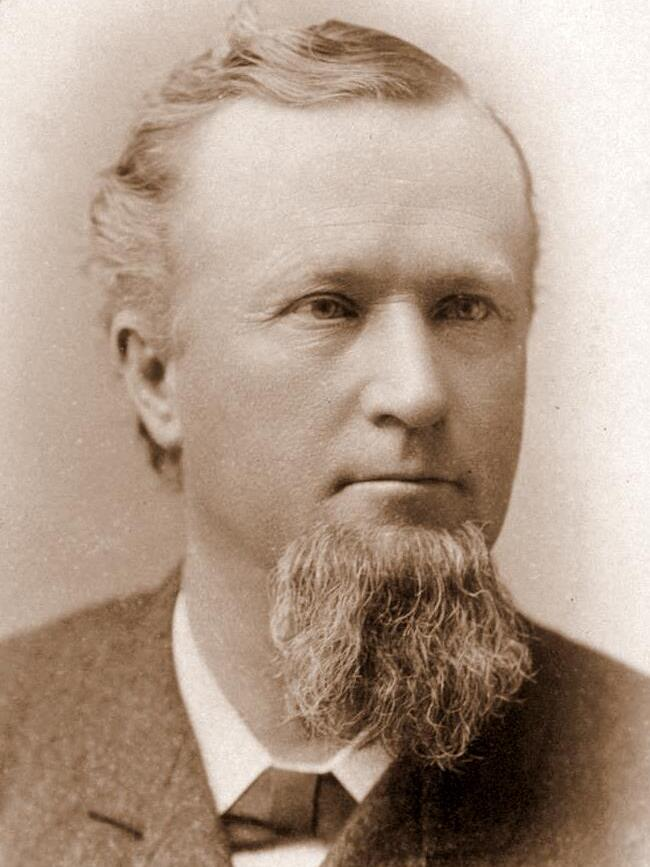
Nominee	Stephen M. White	George C. Perkins	Charles N. Felton
Party	Democratic	Republican	Republican
Joint session	61	12	11
Percentage	51.69%	10.17%	9.32%
Nominee	Thomas R. Bard	David C. Reed	Thomas V. Cator
Party	Republican	Republican	Populist
Joint session	9	8	7
Percentage	7.63%	6.78%	5.93%
Nominee	Robert M. Widney
Party	Silver Republican
Joint session	6
Percentage	5.08%
Senator before election
Charles N. Felton
Republican
Elected Senator
Stephen M. White
Democratic

The 1893 United States Senate election in California was held on January 19, 1893, by the California State Legislature to elect a U.S. senator (Class 1) to represent the State of California in the United States Senate. In a special joint session, former Democratic Lieutenant Governor Stephen M. White was elected over former Republican Governor George C. Perkins, incumbent Republican Senator Charles N. Felton, and several other candidates.

== Results ==
Election in the Legislature (joint session)
Party	Candidate	Votes	%
Democratic	Stephen M. White	61	51.69%
Republican	George C. Perkins	12	10.17%
Republican	Charles N. Felton	11	9.32%
Republican	Thomas R. Bard	9	7.63%
Republican	David C. Reed	8	6.78%
Populist	Thomas V. Cator	7	5.93%
Silver Republican	Robert M. Widney	6	5.08%
Republican	F. C. Franks	3	2.54%
Republican	Morris Estee	1	0.85%
Total votes		118	100.00%
