= John B. Reddick =

American politician

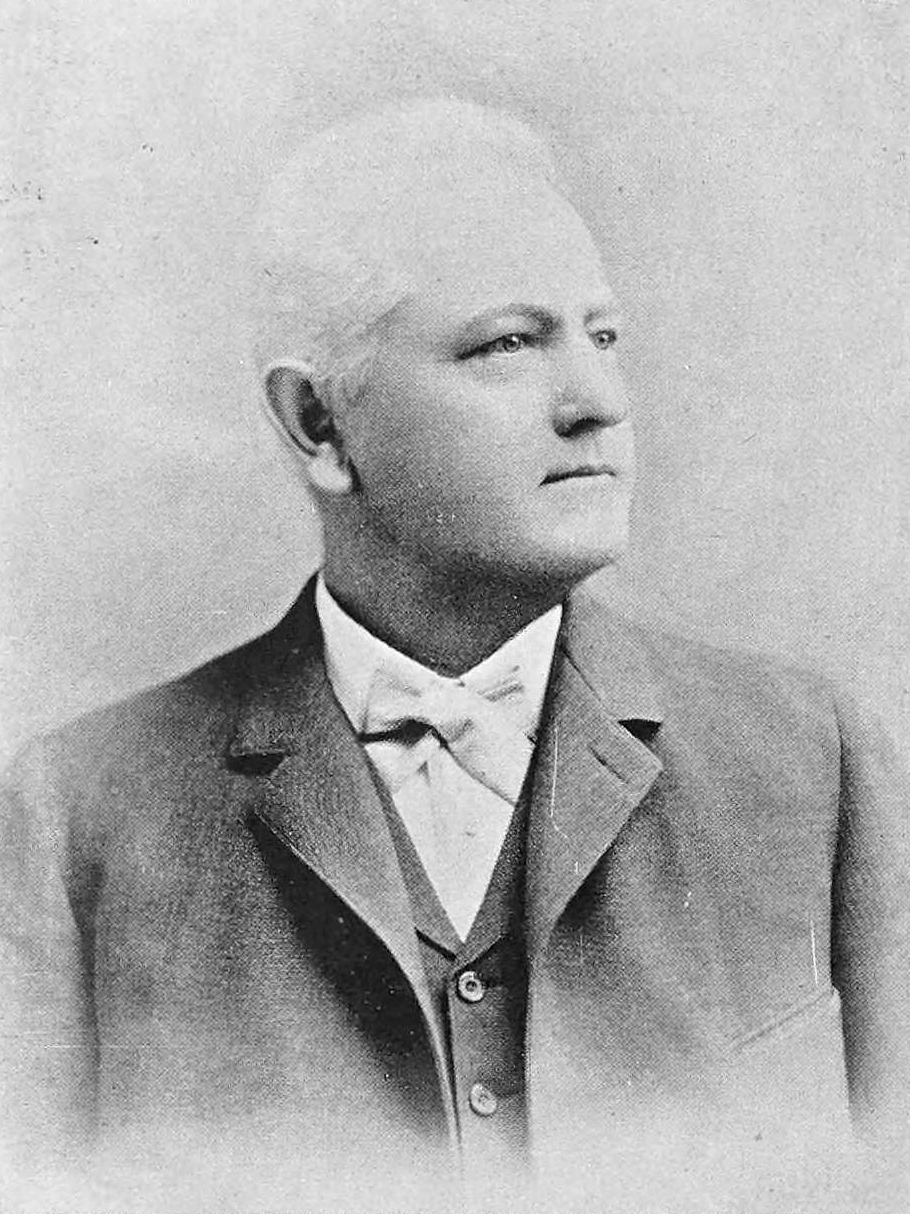
Reddick c. 1895

John B. Reddick (April 9, 1845 – September 16, 1895) was a California attorney and Republican politician who served as the 19th lieutenant governor of California.

== Career ==
Reddick was born in Scioto County, Ohio on April 9, 1845. His family relocated to Calaveras County, California when he was 12 years old, and he graduated from the University of California, Berkeley in 1869. Reddick worked as a teacher and administrator, including serving as deputy superintendent of the Calaveras County public schools for two years. He also studied law, and in 1877 he attained admission to the bar. He practiced in San Andreas, and also became involved in politics, including serving as a justice of the peace. He was a member of the California State Assembly from 1875 to 1877, and 1880 to 1882. In 1884 he was a presidential elector, and cast his ballot for James G. Blaine and John A. Logan.

In 1890, Reddick was the successful Republican nominee for Lieutenant Governor. He served from January 1891 to January 1895.

== Death and burial ==
Reddick died in San Andreas on September 16, 1895. He was buried at Peoples Cemetery in San Andreas.

== Family ==
In 1878, Reddick married A.H. Coulter's daughter Mary. They were the parents of two children, son John Jr. and daughter Edith.

Political offices
Preceded by Stephen M. White; Acting Lieutenant Governor	Lieutenant Governor of California; 1891—1895	Succeeded by Spencer G. Millard
