= Stephen M. White =

American politician (1853–1901)

- Portrait by C. M. Bell c. 1893–1894

United States Senator from California
- In office March 4, 1893 – March 3, 1899
- Preceded by: Charles N. Felton
- Succeeded by: Thomas R. Bard

18th Lieutenant Governor of California
- Acting; September 13, 1887 – January 8, 1891
- Governor: Robert Waterman
- Preceded by: Robert Waterman
- Succeeded by: John B. Reddick

26th President pro tempore of the California State Senate
- In office January 3, 1887 – March 16, 1889
- Preceded by: Benjamin Knight Jr.
- Succeeded by: Thomas Fraser

Member of the California Senate from the 38th district
- In office January 3, 1887 – January 5, 1891
- Preceded by: Constituency established
- Succeeded by: Richard B. Carpenter

17th District Attorney of Los Angeles County
- In office 1882–1884
- Preceded by: Thomas B. Brown
- Succeeded by: George M. Holton

Personal details
- Born: January 19, 1853 San Francisco, California, U.S.
- Died: February 21, 1901 (aged 48) Los Angeles, California, U.S.
- Resting place: Calvary Cemetery, Los Angeles, California
- Party: Democratic
- Spouse: Hortense Sacriste (m. 1883-1901, his death)
- Children: 4
- Parent: William F. White
- Relatives: White family
- Education: Santa Clara College (S.B., 1871)
- Occupation: Attorney

Stephen Mallory White (January 19, 1853 – February 21, 1901) was an American attorney and politician who was the 18th Lieutenant Governor of California from 1887 to 1891. A Democrat, he was a U.S. Senator from California from 1893 to 1899.

A native of San Francisco, White graduated from Santa Clara College in 1871, studied law, and became an attorney in Los Angeles. He became active in politics, and served as Los Angeles County District Attorney and a member of the California Senate. White was elected the Senate's president pro tem, and when the lieutenant governor succeeded to the governorship after the incumbent's death, White was acting lieutenant governor for most of his state senate term.

In 1893, the California legislature elected White to the United States Senate. He served one term and was chairman of the Committee on Irrigation and Reclamation of Arid Lands. As a senator, White was best known for his efforts to secure an improved harbor for Los Angeles, which became the Port of Los Angeles.

After his Senate term, White resumed practicing law. He died in Los Angeles on February 21, 1901, and was buried at Calvary Cemetery in Los Angeles.

== Early life ==
White was born in San Francisco on January 19, 1853, the son of Francis J. "Fannie" (Russell) White and William F. White, a merchant and author who was also active in California's government as a state bank commissioner and in other positions. White's mother was orphaned early in life and raised by relatives in Florida, one of whom was Stephen Mallory. White was tutored by his father's sister until he was 13, then attended a private school in Santa Cruz County. At age 16, he began attendance at St. Ignatius College Preparatory School in San Francisco, where he remained for a year and a half.

White graduated from Santa Clara College in 1871 and studied law in the Santa Cruz area with three established attorneys. He was admitted to the bar in 1874.

== Early career ==
White settled in Los Angeles, where he established a practice. In 1882, White was a charter member of the Los Angeles County Bar Association.

As a defense attorney, White attained a high reputation, but he preferred work on civil cases to criminal trials. He was also active in civic organizations, including the Los Angeles Area Chamber of Commerce and the Native Sons of the Golden West.

== State politics ==
White was a loyal Democrat, sticking with the party even when his father ran for Governor of California on the Workingmen's Party ticket in 1879. White was even nominated by the Workingmen for Los Angeles County District Attorney that year but refused the nomination, instead running successfully as a Democrat two years later, serving from 1882 to 1884. He was a delegate to the 1888 Democratic National Convention in St. Louis, which re-nominated Grover Cleveland for president. In a sign of his growing national stature, White was appointed as the convention's temporary chairman.

White was a member of the California State Senate from 1887 to 1891. He was president pro tempore for both legislative sessions and acted as acted as the lieutenant governor from September 1887 to January 1891, following Robert Waterman's accession to the governorship. White was a trustee of the State Normal School at Los Angeles (now the University of California, Los Angeles) from 1887 to 1893.

== U.S. Senator ==
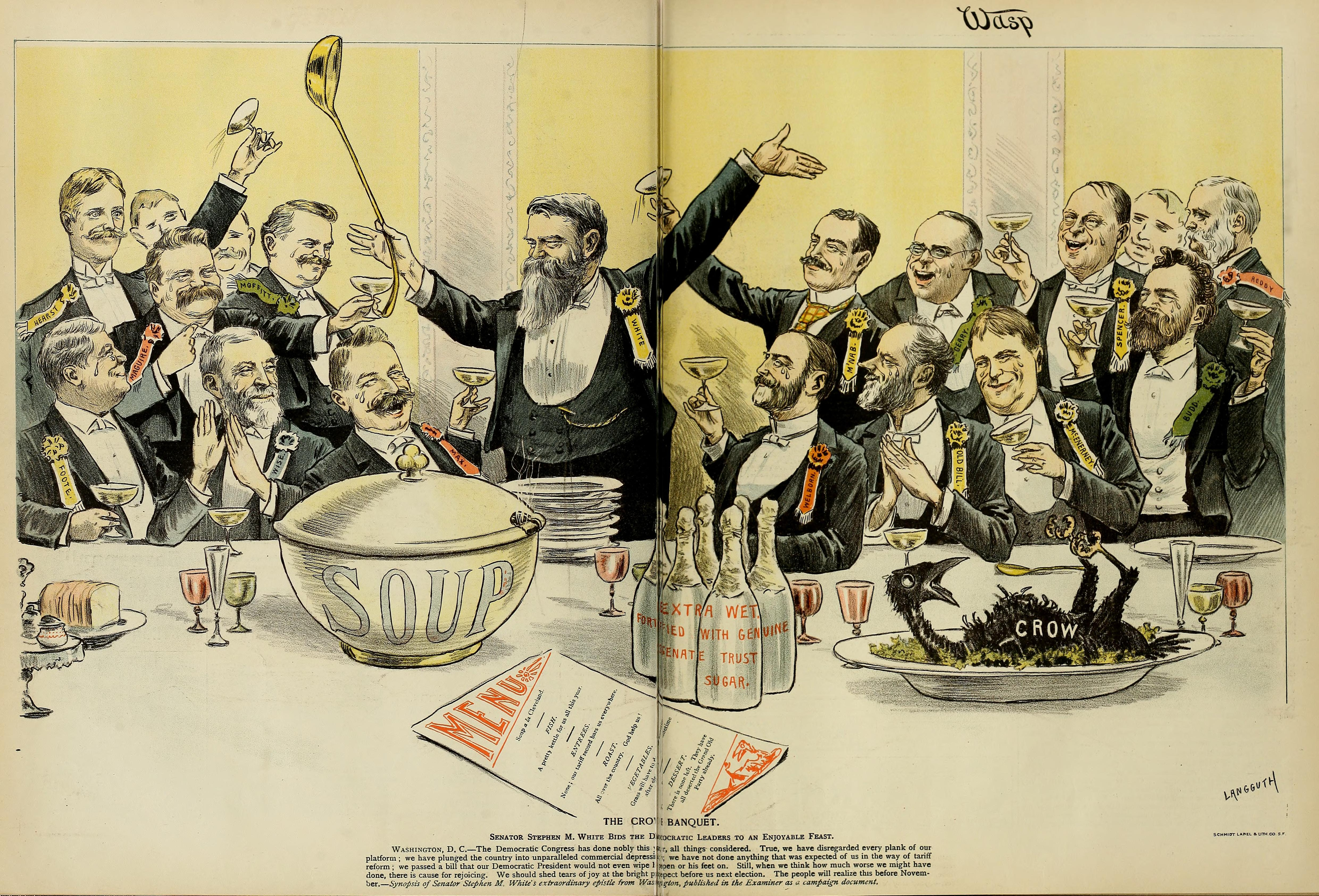
"The Crow Banquet," a political cartoon by Theodore Langguth published in The Wasp mocking White and fellow California Democrats, September 8, 1894

In 1893, White was elected to the United States Senate. He served one term, March 4, 1893, to March 3, 1899. He was the first native Californian to represent the state in the U.S. Senate. During his Senate term, White was chairman of the Committee on Irrigation and Reclamation of Arid Lands. As a senator, White was most notable for his work during the Free Harbor Fight, the effort to secure a deep water harbor at San Pedro, which later became the Port of Los Angeles. White was a delegate to the 1896 Democratic National Convention in Chicago, which nominated William Jennings Bryan. His leadership was again recognized when he was appointed the convention's permanent chairman.

== Later life ==
White was not a candidate for a second term in 1899 and resumed practicing law in Los Angeles. From 1899 to 1901 he served as a Regent of the University of California. White died in Los Angeles on February 21, 1901. He was interred at Calvary Cemetery in Los Angeles.

== Family ==
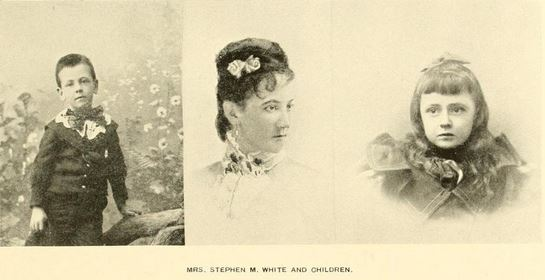
White's wife Hortense Sacriste (center) and their children c. 1895

In 1883, White married Hortense Sacriste (1857–1935). They were the parents of six children, four of whom lived to adulthood:

- William S. (1885–1930)
- Estelle (1886–1967)
- Hortense (1888–1977)
- Stephen M. (1889–1890)
- Unnamed boy (1891–1891)
- Gerald Griffin (1895–1951), who was named for White's paternal great-uncle, the noted Irish poet and novelist.

== Legacy ==
Stephen M. White Middle School in Carson, California, opened in 1957 and is named in White's honor.

A statue memorializing White was paid for by friends and admirers and installed outside the Los Angeles County Courthouse in 1908. In 1959, the old courthouse was condemned, and the White statue was moved to the grounds of the new courthouse. In 1989, the statue was moved to the entrance off Cabrillo Beach off Stephen M. White Drive in San Pedro.

Since 2019, individuals who object to White's support of the Chinese Exclusion Act and other racist actions have advocated for the name of the school to be changed. They have also proposed removing the statue from public display.

Political offices
Preceded by Robert Waterman; Lieutenant Governor	Acting Lieutenant Governor of California; 1887–1891	Succeeded by John B. Reddick; Lieutenant Governor
Preceded by Benjamin Knight Jr.	President pro tempore of the California State Senate; 1887–1889	Succeeded by Thomas Fraser
Preceded by Thomas B. Brown	District Attorney of Los Angeles County; 1882–1884	Succeeded by George M. Holton
U.S. Senate
Preceded by Charles N. Felton	U.S. senator (Class 1) from California; 1893–1899; Served alongside: Leland Stanford, George C. Perkins	Succeeded by Thomas R. Bard
