= Port of Los Angeles =

Harbor in Los Angeles, California

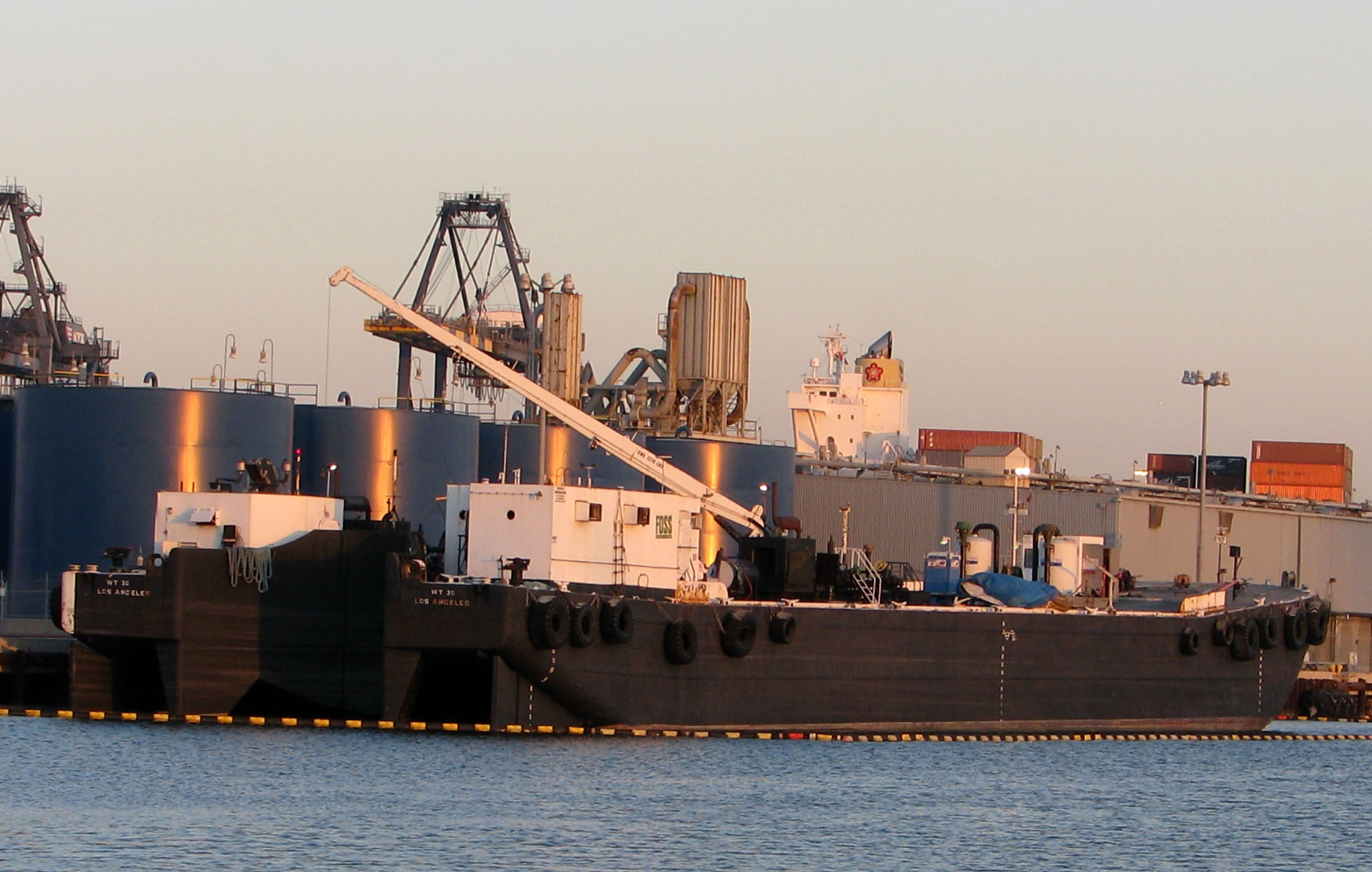
- Port of Los Angeles in 2008
- Interactive map of Port of Los Angeles

Location
- Country: United States
- Location: San Pedro, Los Angeles, California
- Coordinates: 33°43′48″N 118°15′45″W
- UN/LOCODE: US LAX

Details
- Opened: December 9, 1907; 118 years ago
- Size of harbour: 3,200 acres (13 km^{2})
- Land area: 4,300 acres (17 km^{2})
- Size: 7,500 acres (30 km^{2})
- Draft depth: 53 ft (16 m)
- Executive director: Gene Seroka
- Commissioners: Yolanda De La Torre; John Pérez; Lucille Roybal-Allard; Edward Renwick; I. Lee Williams

Statistics
- Vessel arrivals: ▲1,807 (2024)
- Annual cargo tonnage: ▲216 million metric revenue tons (2024)
- Annual container volume: ▼10.2 million twenty-foot equivalent units (TEU) (2025)
- Value of cargo: ▲US$333 billion (2024)
- Passenger traffic: ▼1,112,893 (2024)
- Annual revenue: ▲US$707 million (2024)
- Website portoflosangeles.org

The Port of Los Angeles is a seaport managed by the Los Angeles Harbor Department, a unit of the City of Los Angeles. It occupies 7,500 acres (3,000 ha) of land and water with 43 miles (69 km) of waterfront and adjoins the separate Port of Long Beach. Promoted as '"America's Port", the port is located in San Pedro Bay in the San Pedro and Wilmington neighborhoods of Los Angeles, approximately 20 miles (32 km) south of downtown.

The port has 25 cargo terminals, 82 container cranes, eight container terminals, and 113 miles (182 km) of on-dock rail. The port's top imports are typically furniture, automobile parts, apparel, footwear, and electronics. In 2019, the port's top exports were wastepaper, pet and animal feed, scrap metal and soybeans. In 2020, the port's top three trading partners were China (including Hong Kong), Japan, and Vietnam. In 2022, the port, together with the adjoining Port of Long Beach, were considered amongst the world's least efficient ports by the World Bank and IHS Markit citing union protectionism and a lack of automation.

== History ==
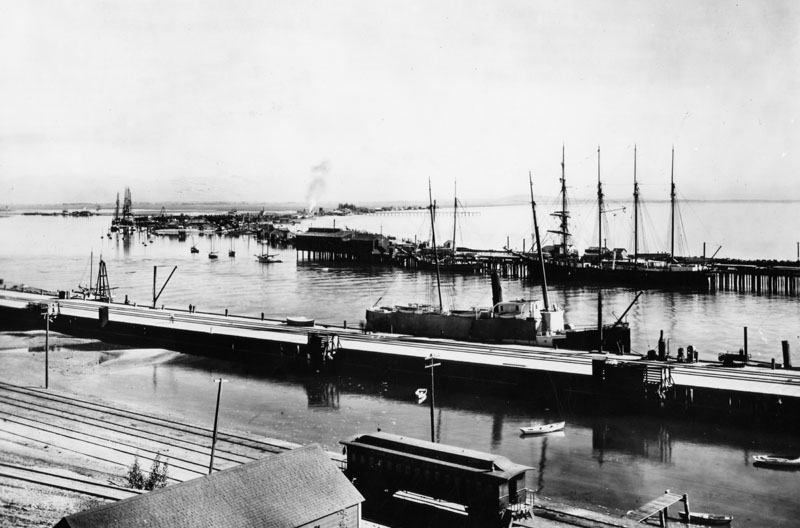
L.A. Harbor, 1899

In 1542, Juan Rodriquez Cabrillo discovered the "Bay of Smokes." The south-facing San Pedro Bay was originally a shallow mudflat, too soft to support a wharf. Visiting ships had two choices: stay far out at anchor and have their goods and passengers ferried to shore, or beach themselves. That sticky process is described in Two Years Before the Mast by Richard Henry Dana Jr., who was a crew member on an 1834 voyage that visited San Pedro Bay. Phineas Banning greatly improved shipping when he dredged the channel to Wilmington in 1871 to a depth of 10 feet (3.0 m). The port handled 50,000 tons of shipping that year. Banning owned a stagecoach line with routes connecting San Pedro to Salt Lake City, Utah, and Yuma, Arizona, and in 1868 he built a railroad to connect San Pedro Bay to Los Angeles, the first in the area.

After Banning's death in 1885, his sons pursued their interests in promoting the port, which handled 500,000 tons of shipping in that year. The Southern Pacific Railroad and Collis P. Huntington wanted to create Port Los Angeles at Santa Monica and built the Long Wharf there in 1893. However, the Los Angeles Times publisher Harrison Gray Otis and U.S. Senator Stephen White pushed for federal support of the Port of Los Angeles at San Pedro Bay. The Free Harbor Fight was settled when San Pedro was endorsed in 1897 by a commission headed by Rear Admiral John C. Walker (who later went on to become the chair of the Isthmian Canal Commission in 1904). With U.S. government support, breakwater construction began in 1899, and the area was annexed to Los Angeles in 1909. The Los Angeles Board of Harbor Commissioners was founded in 1907.

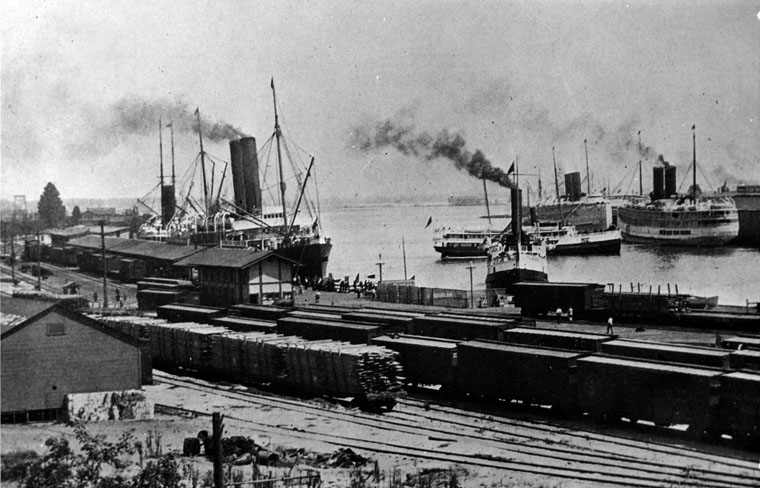
Port of Los Angeles, 1913

In 1912 the Southern Pacific Railroad completed its first major wharf at the port. During the 1920s, the port surpassed San Francisco as the West Coast's busiest seaport. In the early 1930s, a massive expansion of the port was undertaken with the construction of a breakwater three miles out and over two miles in length. In addition to the construction of this outer breakwater, an inner breakwater was built off Terminal Island with docks for seagoing ships and smaller docks built at Long Beach. It was this improved harbor that hosted the sailing events for the 1932 Summer Olympics.

Prior to the proliferation of refrigeration in the 1930s, canning was a significant industry in the port, preserving freshly caught fish for distribution to the rest of the country, and companies such as StarKist and the Van Camp Seafood Company were established along Tuna Street on Terminal Island to take advantage of the fishing community based there. Both fish and canning were grueling work, with fishermen often gone for weeks if not months at a time, and their wives working long hours at the cannery, attracting immigrant fishermen from Croatia, Japan, and Portugal.

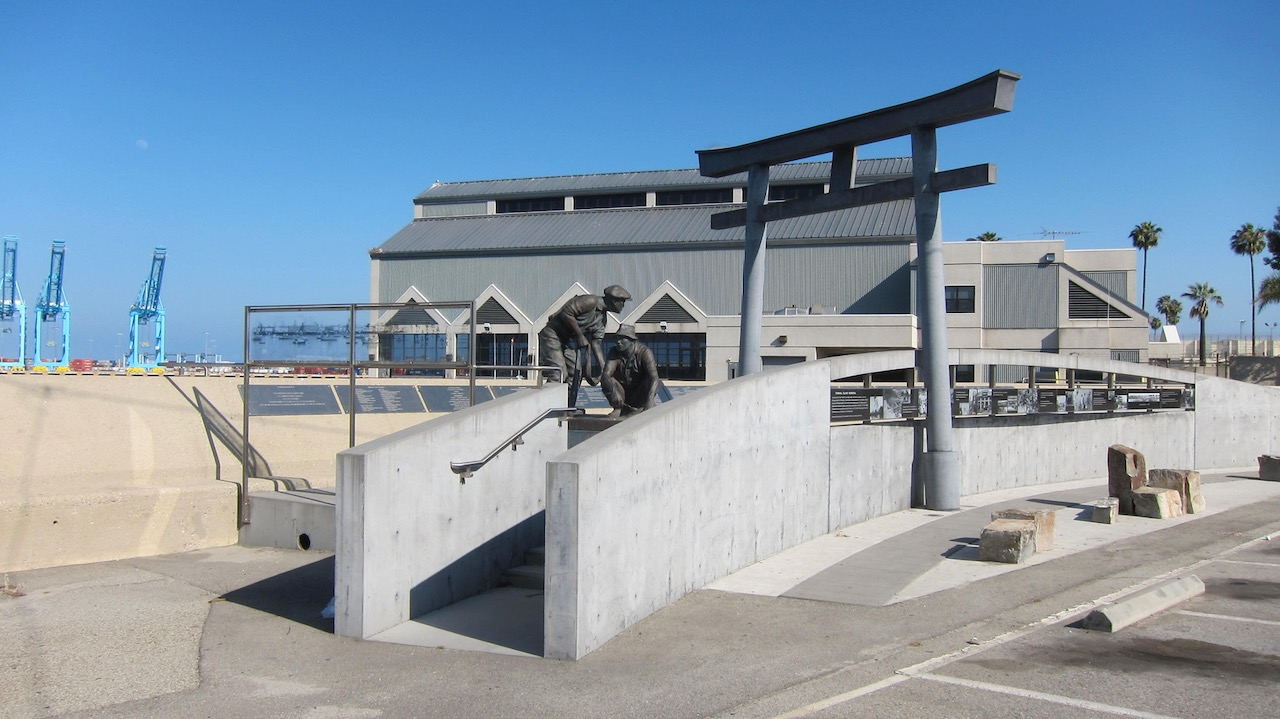
Japanese-American Memorial on Terminal Island

Japanese-Americans began moving to the port around 1906, sought out by the canneries for their expertise in fishing and canning, and were offered subsidized housing to encourage them to move there, with some 3,000 Japanese-Americans living on Terminal Island in 1940. Everything changed following the attack on Pearl Harbor as nativist organizations used the attack to pressure the U.S. government to order the forced removal of American citizens of Japanese ancestry from coastal areas, and sent to camps far inland with only what they could carry, often forced to abandon or sell property at pennies on the dollar. Terminal Islanders, regardless of origin were especially hit hard as the government seized much of the land through eminent domain in order to ramp up shipbuilding for the war effort. Today, only a small memorial is all that is left of the once thriving fishing community that was based there.

During World War II, the port was primarily used for shipbuilding, employing more than 90,000 people. In 1959, Matson Navigation Company's Hawaiian Merchant delivered 20 containers to the port, beginning the port's shift to containerization. The opening of the Vincent Thomas Bridge in 1963 greatly improved access to Terminal Island and allowed increased traffic and further expansion of the port. In 1985, the port handled one million containers in a year for the first time. During the 2002 West Coast port labor lockout, the port had a large backlog of ships waiting to be unloaded at any given time. In 2000, the Pier 400 Dredging and Landfill Program, the largest such project in America, was completed. By 2013, more than half a million containers were moving through the Port every month.

Disruptions arising through the COVID-19 pandemic led to 109 container ships blocking the port during 2021-22, leading many shipping operators to look to other ports for docking.

== Harbor district ==
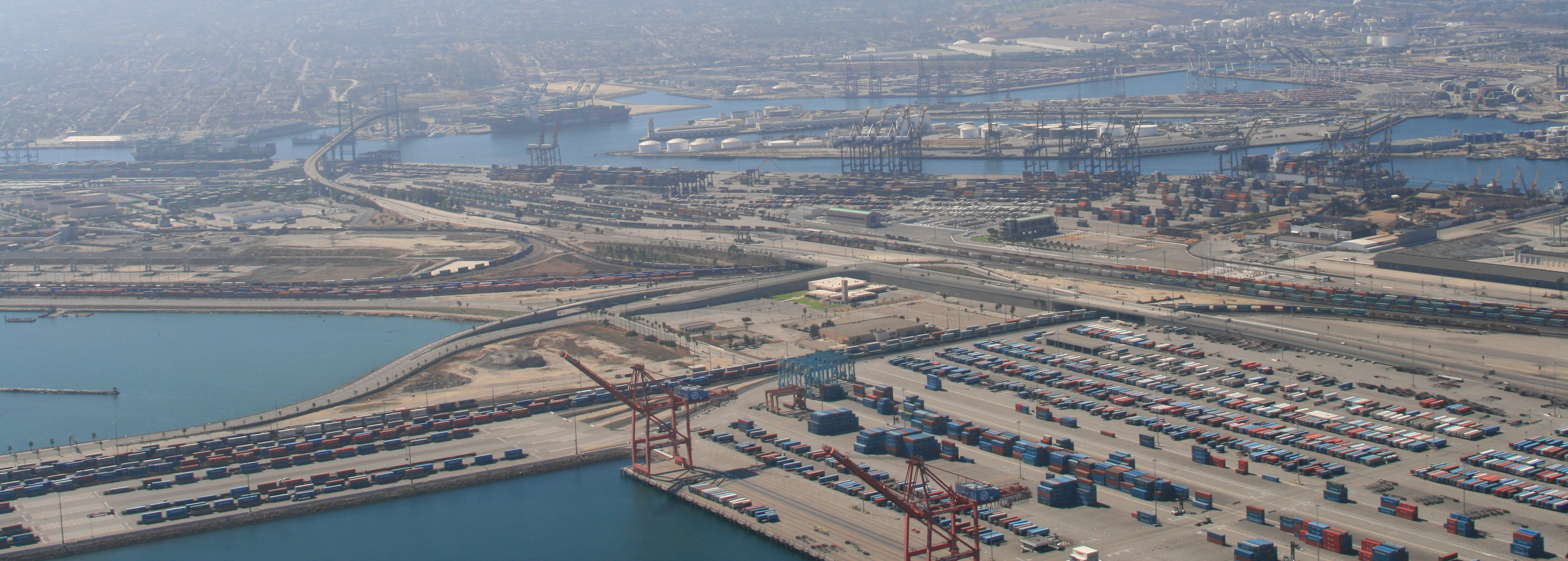
Port of Los Angeles in 2016

The harbor district is an independent, self-supporting department of the government of the City of Los Angeles which administers the port, under the control of a five-member Board of Harbor Commissioners appointed by the mayor and approved by the city council, and is administered by an executive director. The port maintains an AA bond rating, the highest rating attainable for self-funded ports.

As of 2016, the port had about a dozen pilots, including two chiefs. Pilots have specialized knowledge of the harbor and San Pedro Bay. They meet the ships waiting to enter the harbor and provide advice as the vessel is steered through the congested waterway to the dock.

For public safety protection inside the port and for its businesses, the Port of Los Angeles utilizes the Los Angeles Port Police for police service, the Los Angeles Fire Department (LAFD) to provide fire and EMS services, the U.S. Coast Guard for waterway security, Homeland Security to protect federal land at the port, the Los Angeles County Lifeguards to provide lifeguard services for open waters outside of the harbor, while Los Angeles City Recreation & Parks Department lifeguards patrol the inner Cabrillo Beach.

== Shipping ==
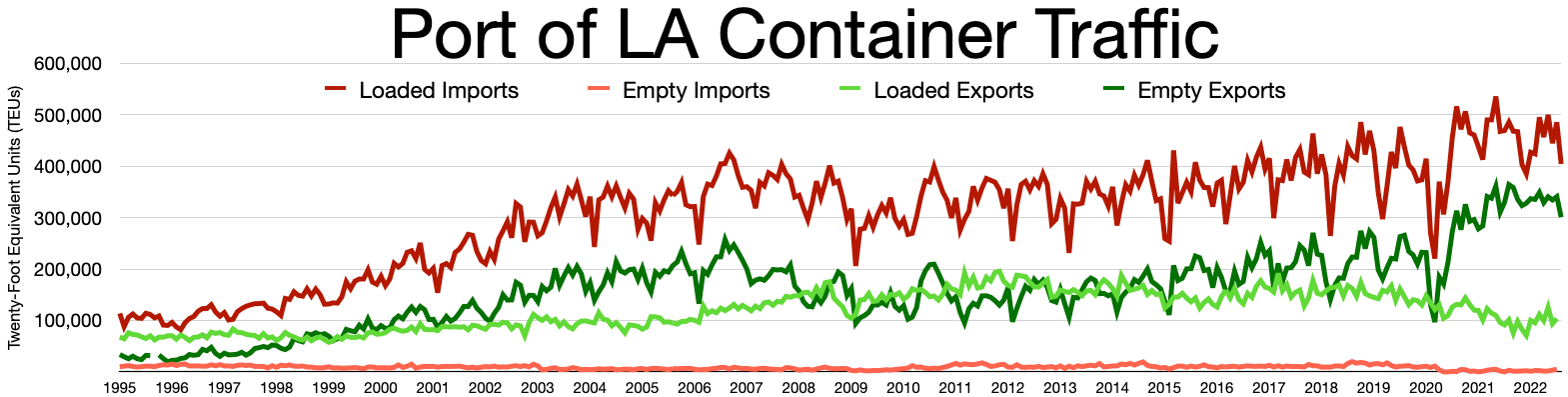
Port of LA traffic Loaded Imports Empty Exports Loaded Exports Empty Imports

The port's container volume was 9.3 million twenty-foot equivalent units (TEU) in calendar year 2019, a 5.5% increase over 2016's record-breaking year of 8.8 million TEU. It has the most cargo moved annually by a Western Hemisphere port. The port is the busiest port in the United States by container volume, the 19th-busiest container port in the world, and the 10th-busiest worldwide when combined with the neighboring Port of Long Beach. The port is also the number-one freight gateway in the United States when ranked by the value of shipments passing through it. The port's top trading partners in 2019 were:

1. China/Hong Kong ($128 billion)
2. Japan ($89 billion)
3. Vietnam ($21 billion)
4. South Korea ($15 billion)
5. Taiwan ($15 billion)

The most-imported types of goods in the 2019 calendar year were, in order: furniture (579,405), automobile parts (340,546), apparel (312,655), and electronic products (209,622).

The port is served by the Pacific Harbor Line (PHL) railroad. From the PHL, intermodal railroad cars go north to Los Angeles via the Alameda Corridor.

In 2011, no American port could handle ships of the PS-class Emma Mærsk and the future Maersk Triple E class size, the latter of which needs cranes reaching 23 rows. In 2012, the port and the U.S. Army Corps of Engineers deepened the port's main navigational channel to 53 feet (16 m), which is deep enough to accommodate the draft of the world's biggest container ships. However, Maersk had no plans in 2014 to bring those ships to America. In 2024 the port received 3 cranes capable of servicing ships up to 18,000 TEU.

Los Angeles and Long Beach ports were some of the least efficient in the world, according to a 2022 ranking by the World Bank and IHS Markit.

== Cruise ship terminal ==
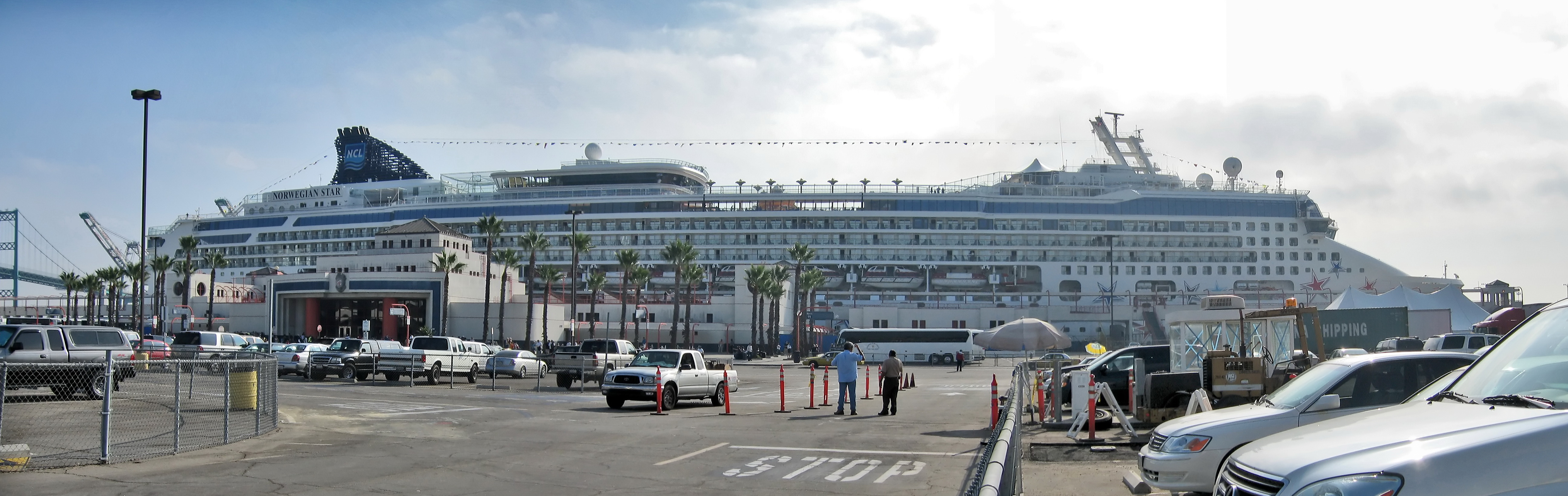
Norwegian Star at the World Cruise Center in October 2006

The World Cruise Center, located in San Pedro, Los Angeles, beneath the Vincent Thomas Bridge, has three passenger ship berths.

== Public access investments ==
China Shipping Alternative Maritime Power, Catalina Express high speed catamaran, and Diamond Princess docked at the World Cruise Center near the Vincent Thomas Bridge.

The LA Waterfront is a visitor-serving destination in the city of Los Angeles, funded and maintained by the Port of Los Angeles. In 2009, the Los Angeles Harbor Commission approved the San Pedro Waterfront and Wilmington Waterfront development programs, under the LA Waterfront umbrella. The LA Waterfront consists of a series of waterfront development and community enhancement projects covering more than 400 acres (160 ha) of existing Port of Los Angeles property in both San Pedro and Wilmington. With miles of public promenade and walking paths, acres of open space and scenic views, the LA Waterfront attracts thousands of visitors annually. Remodel and reconstruction was approved by the Los Angeles City Council. Development is set to be completed in 2020. Construction is expected to begin in 2017 at a partial project cost of $90 million, paid by the developer. The San Pedro Public Market is expected to open in 2020, with demolition beginning as early as November 2016.

The Waterfront Red Car is a currently non-operational heritage trolley line for public transit along the waterfront in San Pedro. Prior to its closure in 2015, it used vintage and restored Pacific Electric Red Cars to connect the World Cruise Center, Downtown San Pedro, Ports O' Call Village, and the San Pedro Marina.

== Environment ==
Oceangoing ships visiting ports are a large source of nitrogen oxides in Southern California. Heavy-duty diesel trucks, that are also part of the freight-moving port complexes, emit exhaust with nitrogen oxides and particulate matter. The California Air Resources Board is working on reducing these sources of pollution that produce the nation's most polluted air smog and kill more than 3,500 Southern Californians each year. In 2021, the South Coast Air Quality Management District required warehouses in the port which do not cut emissions of carbon and pollutants to pay fees.

The port installed the first Alternative Maritime Power (AMP) berth in 2004 and can provide up to 40 MW of grid power to two cruise ships simultaneously at both 6.6 kV and 11 kV, as well as three container terminals, reducing pollution from ship engines.

In an effort to buffer the nearby community of Wilmington from the port, in June 2011 the Wilmington Waterfront Park was opened.

In 2024, the nonprofit political organization Environment California sued the Port of Los Angeles for alleged violations of the federal Clean Water Act, claiming the port had violated the act more that 2,000 in just the previous 5 years. In April 2025, the Port of Los Angeles settled the lawsuit, agreeing to pay $1.3 million to the Rose Foundation For Communities & The Environment for projects to restore the Los Angeles Harbor and San Pedro Bay, plus a $130,000 civil penalty to the U.S. Treasury.

=== Clean Air Action Program ===
The $2.8 million San Pedro Bay Ports Clean Air Action Program (CAAP) initiative was implemented by the Board of Harbor Commissioners in October 2002 for terminal and ship operations programs targeted at reducing polluting emissions from vessels and cargo handling equipment. To accelerate implementation of emission reductions through the use of new and cleaner-burning equipment, the port has allocated more than $52 million in additional funding for the CAAP through 2008.

As of May 2016, the Port of Los Angeles has already surpassed its initial 2023 emission goals 8 years ahead of predicted time frame. The dramatic success to reduce emissions has seen a decrease in diesel particulate matter reduce 72%, sulfur oxides by 93%, and nitrogen oxide by 22% so far. The CAAP program was updated to 3.0 after this environmental successes of the initiatives. With the recent ramification of environment goals the updates will look to reduce the emissions through efficient supply chain optimization. There has also been recent developments to increase port technologies advancement to promote the development of efficient and green port technologies. The CAAP also looks to be the lead role caretaker of fostering and improving the wildlife and ecosystem of the port.

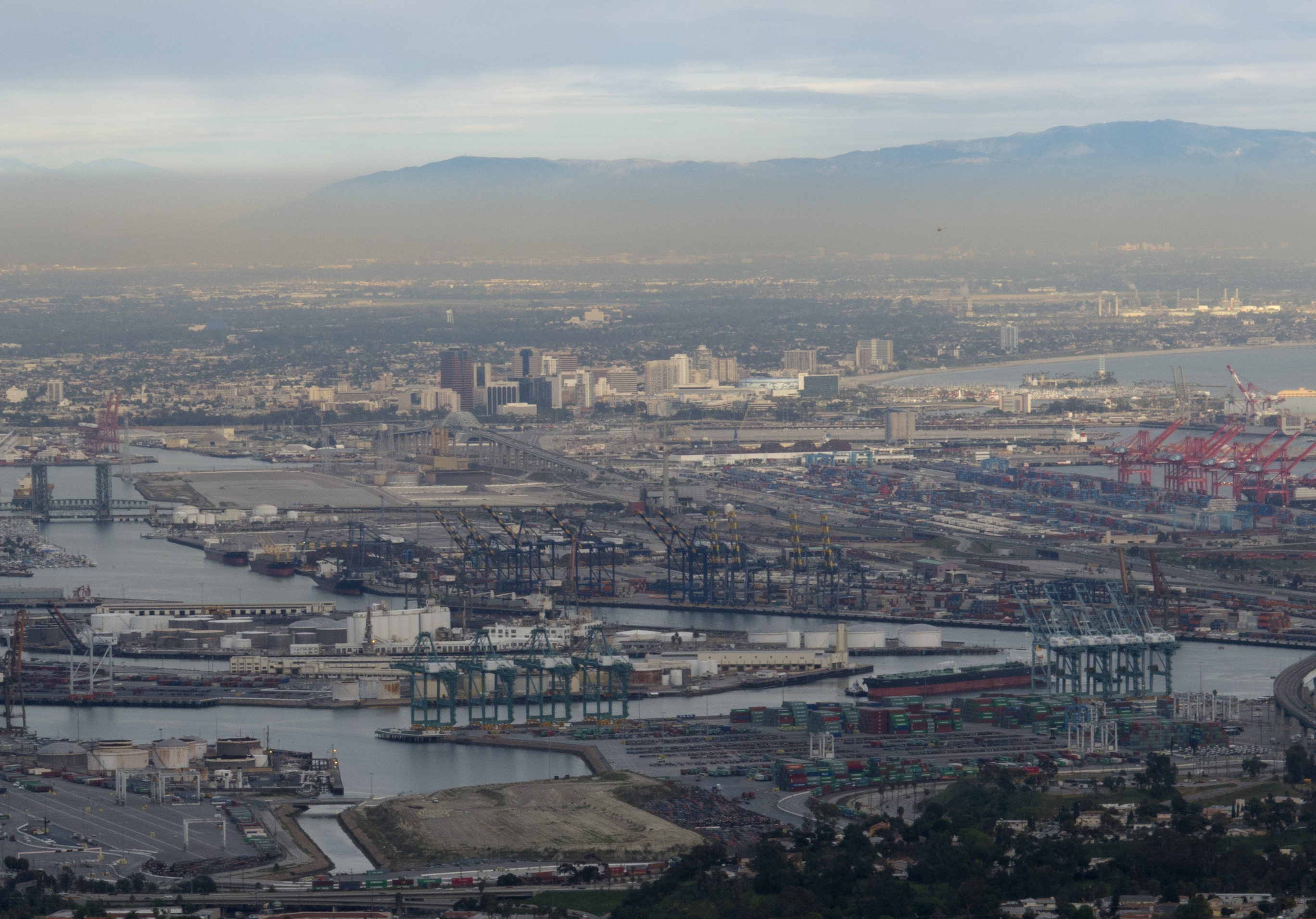
View from Palos Verdes

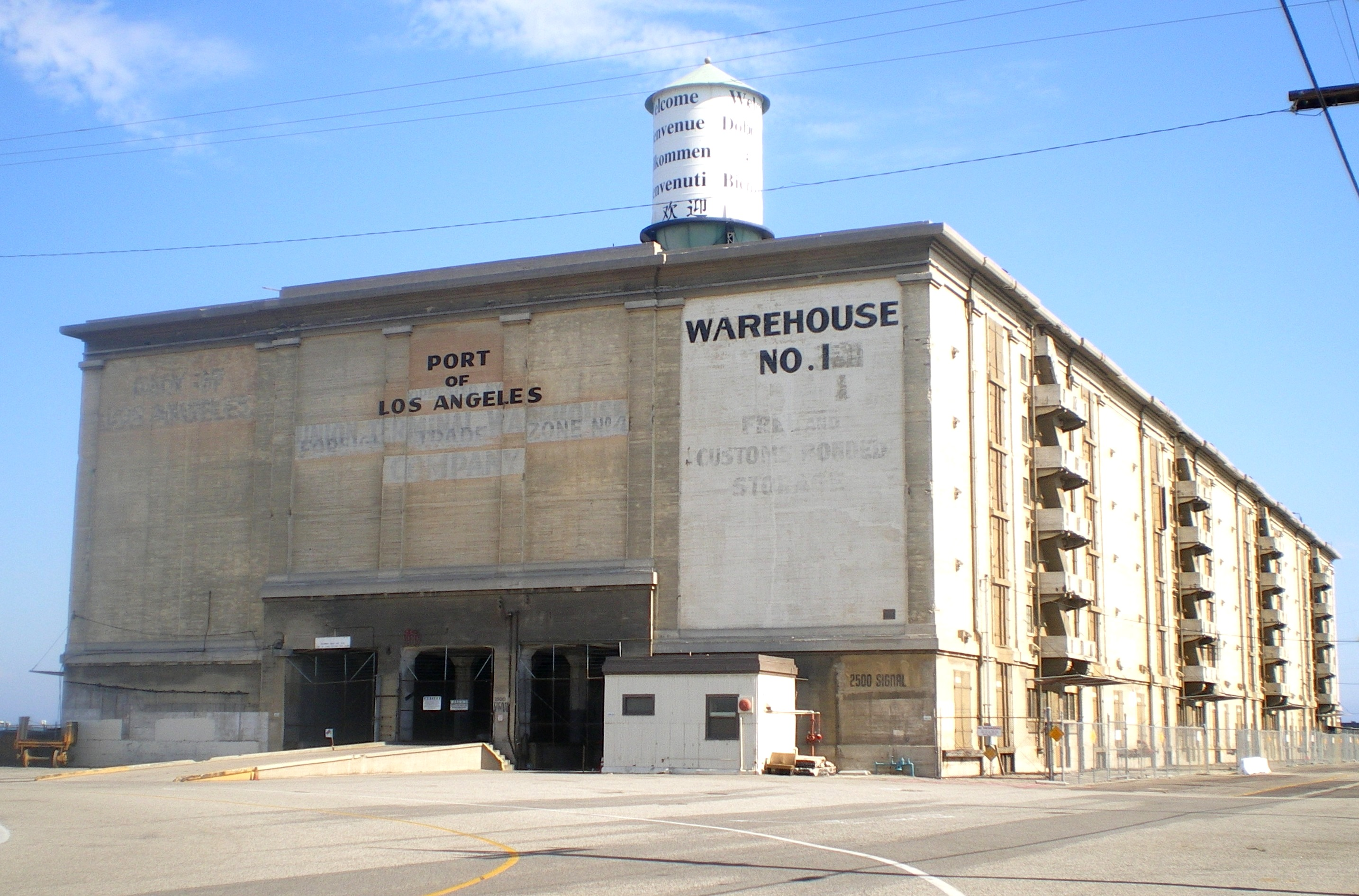
Municipal Warehouse No. 1

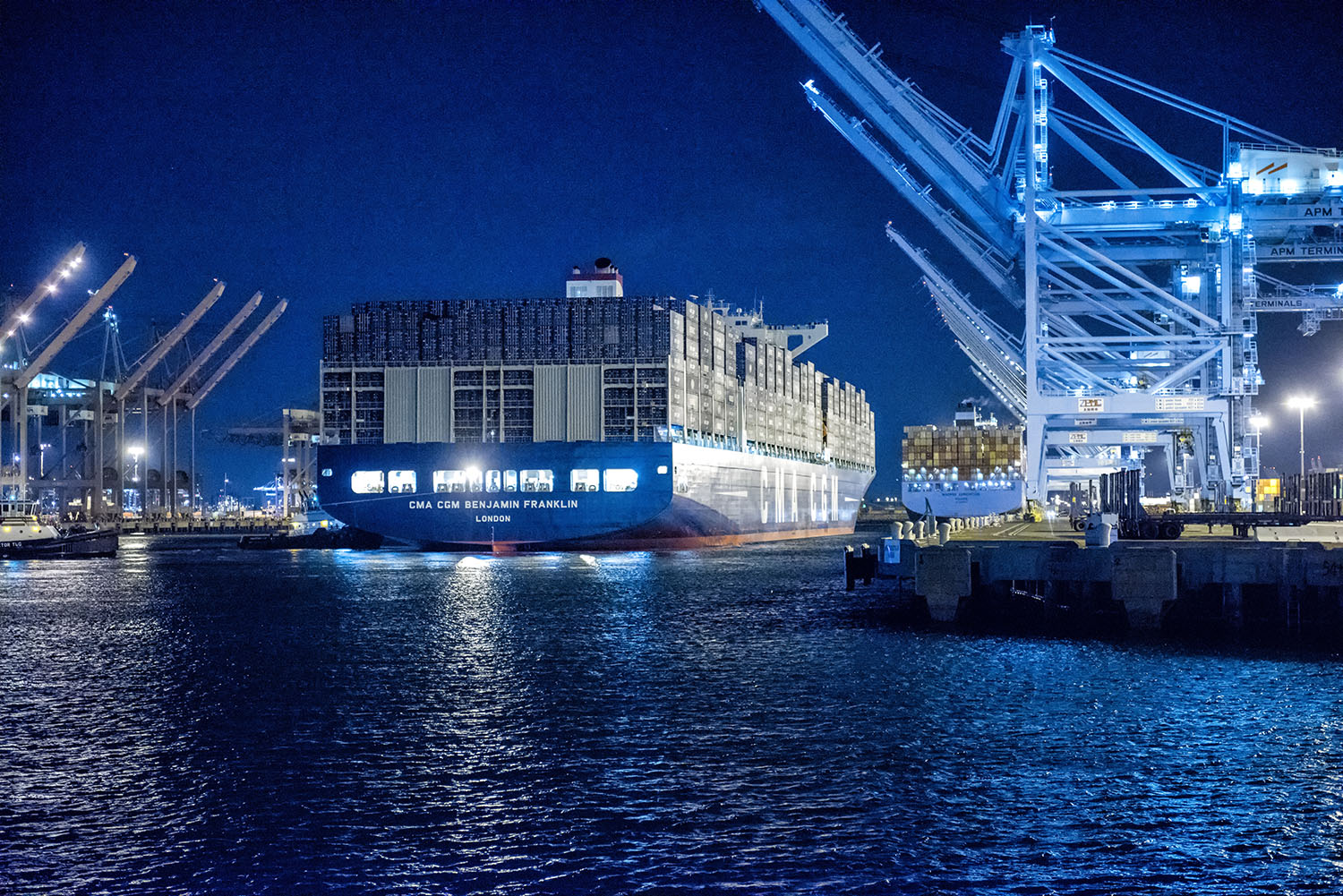
CMA CGM Benjamin Franklin at the port

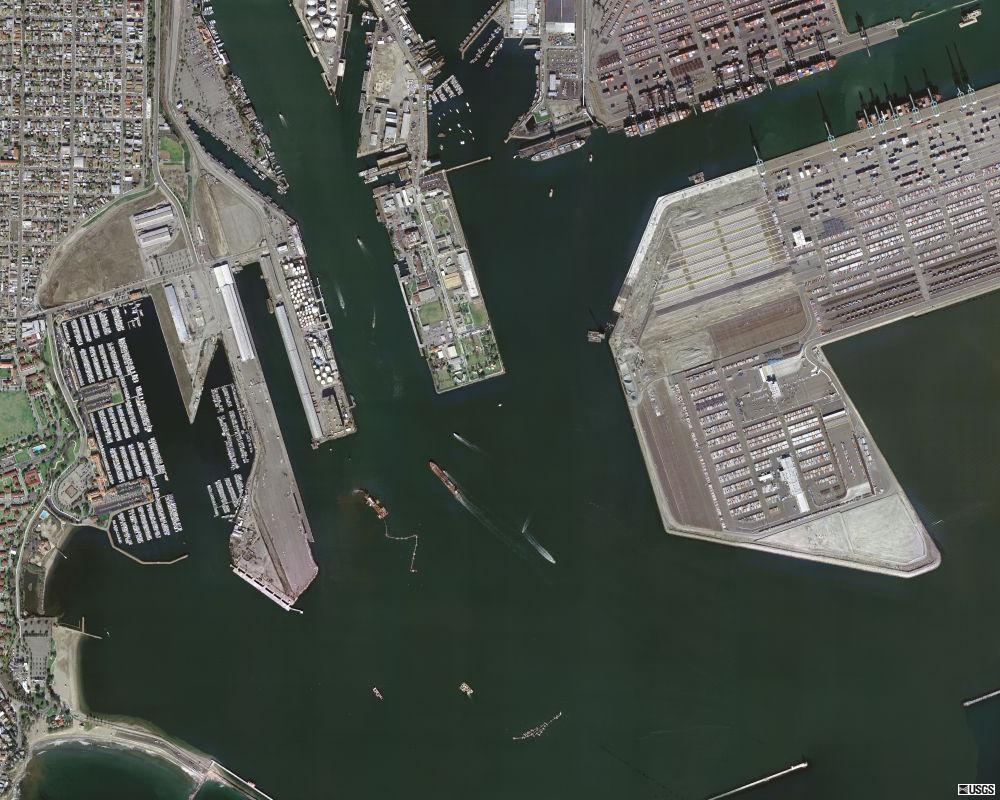
USGS satellite picture of a portion of the Port, 2004

== See also ==
- List of ports in the United States
- Port of Long Beach
- Port of San Diego
- Kenneth Hahn, youngest pilot in the history of the Port
- SS Sansinena Berth 46 incident
- SS Lane Victory a working museum ship
- USS Iowa Museum (the former USS Iowa), a World War II era battleship that permanently docked at Berth 87 since June 2012 as a museum ship.
- Todd Pacific Shipyards, Los Angeles Division, a Port of Los Angeles shipyard from 1917 to 1989.
- United States container ports
