= Benjamin Knight (politician) =

American politician, physician (1836–1905)

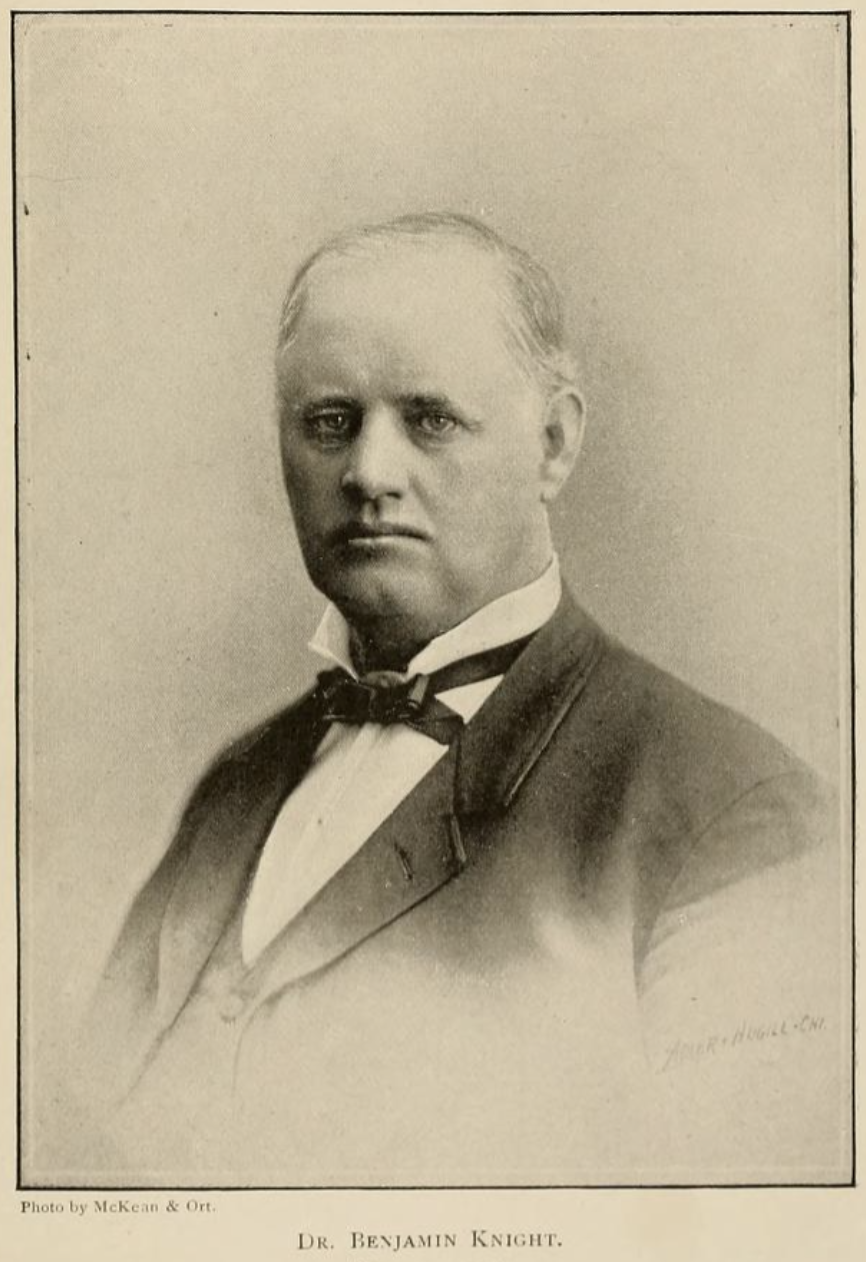

25th President pro tempore of the California State Senate
- In office January 5, 1885 – March 12, 1887
- Preceded by: R.F. del Valle
- Succeeded by: Stephen M. White

Member of the California Senate from the 6th district
- In office January 8, 1883 – January 3, 1887
- Preceded by: William J. Hill
- Succeeded by: Archibald Yell

Personal details
- Born: October 16, 1836 Mansfield, Connecticut, U.S.
- Died: June 2, 1905 (aged 68) Santa Cruz, California, U.S.
- Resting place: Santa Cruz Memorial Park, Santa Cruz, California, U.S.
- Party: Democratic
- Spouse: Lydia A. Killey
- Children: 4
- Education: Harvard Medical School

Military service
- Branch/service: United States Army
- Rank: Corporal
- Unit: 1st Massachusetts Cavalry Regiment
- Battles/wars: American Civil War

Benjamin Knight Jr. (October 16, 1836 – June 2, 1905) was an American politician and physician in Santa Cruz, California. He served in the California State Senate for the 6th district from 1883 to 1887.

== Life and career ==
Benjamin Knight Jr. was born on October 16, 1836, in Mansfield, Connecticut. He was a descendant of Maturin Murray Ballou, a collaborator of Roger Williams the founder of Rhode Island. His father, Benjamin Knight Sr., was a machinist. He was raised in Rhode Island, and attended Providence Conference Seminary (later East Greenwich Academy) at East Greenwich.

During the American Civil War, he joined Company I, 1st Massachusetts Cavalry Regiment of the Union Army, and served twenty-one months, where he became a corporal.

Knight graduated from Harvard Medical School on March 1868. The focus of his study was in female hysteria (now an outdated diagnosis).

On April 4, 1869, he married Lydia A. Killey of Johnston, Rhode Island; together they had four children, three daughters and one son. Shortly after marriage the family moved to Santa Cruz, California, where his father had travelled to during the California gold rush in 1850.

For 14 years, Knight worked as the Santa Cruz County physician. He served on the Democratic ticket in the California State Senate from 1883 to 1887, where he also served as the Senate's President pro tempore.

== Death and legacy ==
Knight died on June 2, 1905, in his home in Santa Cruz, California.

His son, Benjamin Killey Knight (1874–1947), served as the Santa Cruz County District Attorney, and later as a Superior Court Judge. His grandson Benjamin Bliss Knight (1899–1989) also served as Santa Cruz County District Attorney.

| Preceded by R.F. del Valle | President pro tempore of the California State Senate; 1885–1887 | Succeeded by Stephen M. White |
