= Free Harbor Fight =

Legal battle over location of proposed Los Angeles Harbor

The Free Harbor Fight refers to the legal battle in the late nineteenth century on the West Coast of the United States, around the Los Angeles Area Chamber of Commerce against Huntington and the Southern Pacific Railroad. US Senator Stephen M. White did not cave in to pressure by railroad baron Collis Huntington and his congressional allies, which resulted in the Port of Los Angeles being located in San Pedro, instead of Santa Monica, as Huntington had wanted.

Los Angeles has no natural harbor, and in the 1880s, the rail line to its inadequate port at San Pedro was controlled by railroad magnate Huntington. San Pedro had always been regarded as the natural spot for the harbor because the Palos Verdes Peninsula protects it from most heavy seas and gales. San Pedro grew slowly but steadily through the 1800s, along with the tiny community of Los Angeles, 20 miles to the north. When his control over the port was threatened, Huntington planned a new port at Santa Monica to be built with federal money taken from San Pedro. He quietly purchased most of the Santa Monica waterfront. Early in 1892, he startled the populace of the region by starting to build his own harbor in Santa Monica, including a wharf stretching nine tenths of a mile into the bay. He built the long wharf in Santa Monica to compete with the existing facilities at San Pedro. The Long Wharf (it was, in fact, the world's longest) became a tourist attraction. Sightseers would ride the old Jones rail line, now operated by Southern Pacific, to the beach to watch it taking shape. From 1890, he attempted to obtain federal funds to improve the Santa Monica port. He wanted to impose a monopoly at the expense of the San Pedro port. He chose a site that would guarantee his dominance of the Santa Monica port.

Los Angeles took Huntington to court over the issue. For two full days in June 1896, White, a California Democrat, took the Senate floor and delivered an indictment of the Southern Pacific's predatory policies. He offered an amendment to the bill that if Santa Monica was chosen, any other railroad could use its harbor for a reasonable fee. Huntington and Senator William P. Frye, a Maine Republican, pleaded with White to withdraw his amendment, but White refused to budge. With the bill now beyond the control of the Commerce Committee, the full Senate quickly adopted the measure, including White's amendment. In March 1897, another board of engineering experts made the final decision in favor of San Pedro. The Chamber won and made Los Angeles a "free" harbor, independent of the influence of the Southern Pacific Railroad. White was seen as a hero. Crowds cheered as his homebound train passed by, and a parade through Los Angeles was held in his honor. The staunchly-Republican Los Angeles Times called the Democratic senator “the greatest man the state has produced in its half-century of existence,” and $25,000 was raised for a statue of White, which now overlooks the Port of Los Angeles.

San Pedro Bay grew into one of the world's great ports, and Santa Monica was transformed into a glamorous beach resort, with powerful impacts on the region's urban geography. A 16-mile strip of land (26 km), from Downtown Los Angeles to San Pedro and Wilmington, would soon be part of the City of Los Angeles.

== See also ==
- Stephen M. White
- Collis Potter Huntington
- History of Los Angeles
