= 1879 California gubernatorial election =

- September 3, 1879
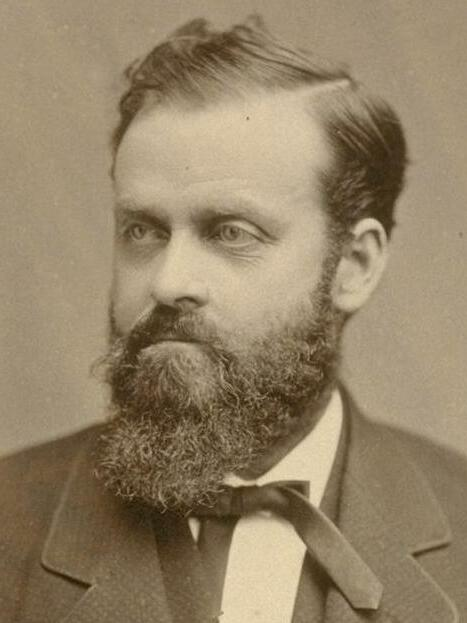

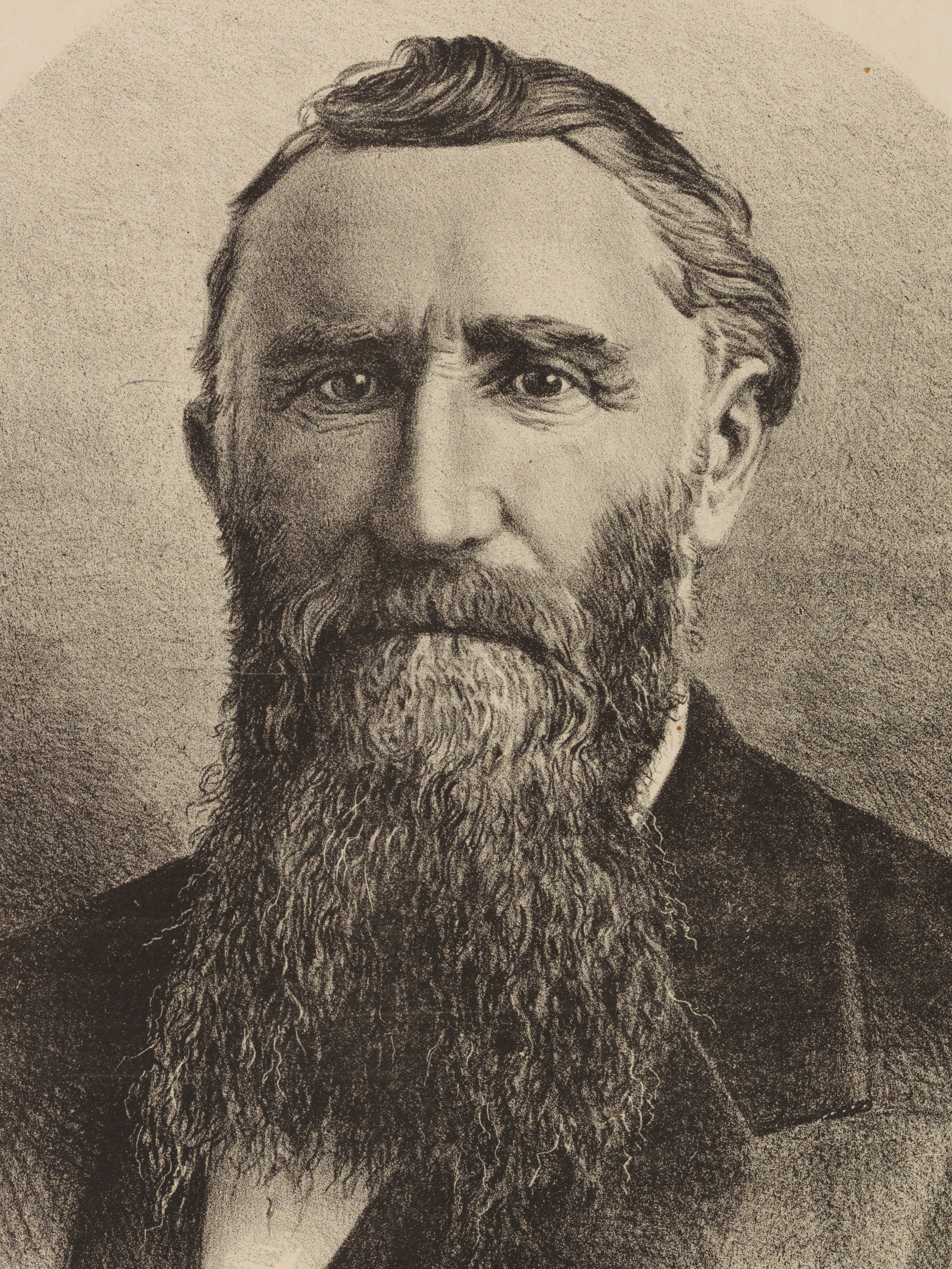

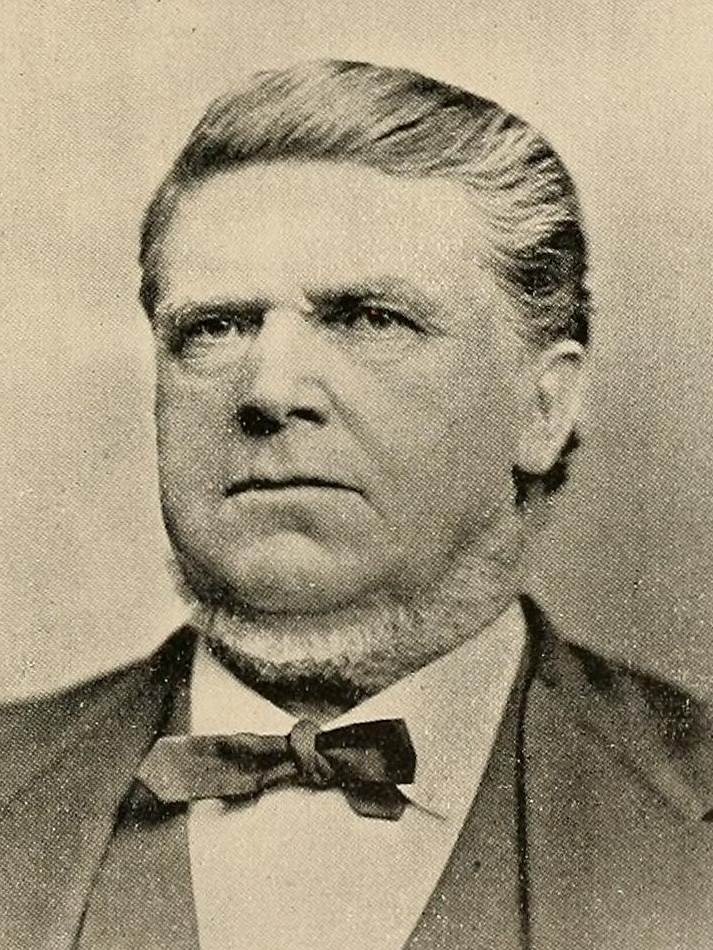
Nominee	George Clement Perkins	Hugh J. Glenn	William F. White
Party	Republican	Democratic	Workingmen's
Popular vote	67,965	47,667	44,482
Percentage	42.42%	29.75%	27.76%
- County results Perkins: 30–40% 40–50% 50–60% 60–70% Glenn: 40–50% 50–60% 60–70% 70–80% White: 30–40% 40–50%
Governor before election
William Irwin
Democratic
Elected Governor
George C. Perkins
Republican

The 1879 California gubernatorial election was held on September 3, 1879, to elect the governor of California. George Clement Perkins won a plurality of votes, marking the fourth consecutive election in which the incumbent governor's party was defeated. Earlier that year, on May 7, 1879, voters in California approved a new constitution which, effective in 1880, moved the dates of elections to even-numbered years to coincide with elections for federal offices. Thus, the next election for governor would be held on November 7, 1882. As such, Perkins' term as governor would last only three years.

== Results ==
California gubernatorial election, 1879
Party	Candidate	Votes	%	±%
Republican	George Clement Perkins	67,965	42.42%	+16.95%
Democratic	Hugh J. Glenn	47,647	29.75%	−20.29%
Workingmen's	William F. White	44,482	27.76%	+27.76%
Prohibition	A. C. Clark	119	0.07%	−0.22%
	Scattering	2	0.00%	
Majority		20,318	12.68%	
Total votes		160,215	100.00%	
Republican gain from Democratic		Swing	+37.23%	

=== Results by county ===
County	George C. Perkins Republican		Hugh J. Glenn Democratic		William F. White Workingmen's		A. C. Clark Prohibition		Scattering Write-in		Margin		Total votes cast
County	#	%	#	%	#	%	#	%	#	%	#	%	Total votes cast
Alameda	5,179	53.91%	1,418	14.76%	3,007	31.30%	3	0.03%	0	0.00%	2,172 (Note: Margin over White)	22.61%	9,607
Alpine	111	62.01%	59	32.96%	9	5.03%	0	0.00%	0	0.00%	52	29.05%	179
Amador	1,033	41.42%	1,136	45.55%	325	13.03%	0	0.00%	0	0.00%	-103	-4.13%	2,494
Butte	1,715	50.06%	1,477	43.11%	233	6.80%	1	0.03%	0	0.00%	238	6.95%	3,426
Calaveras	770	35.78%	748	34.76%	634	29.46%	0	0.00%	0	0.00%	22	1.02%	2,152
Colusa	659	29.06%	1,506	66.40%	102	4.50%	1	0.04%	0	0.00%	-847	-37.35%	2,268
Contra Costa	919	44.76%	576	28.06%	558	27.18%	0	0.00%	0	0.00%	343	16.71%	2,053
Del Norte	269	48.47%	102	18.38%	184	33.15%	0	0.00%	0	0.00%	85	15.32%	555
El Dorado	1,163	43.22%	1,126	41.84%	402	14.94%	0	0.00%	0	0.00%	37	1.37%	2,691
Fresno	285	21.11%	951	70.44%	114	8.44%	0	0.00%	0	0.00%	-666	-49.33%	1,350
Humboldt	1,317	43.77%	365	12.13%	1,327	44.10%	0	0.00%	0	0.00%	-10	-0.33%	3,009
Inyo	252	44.52%	295	52.12%	19	3.36%	0	0.00%	0	0.00%	-43	-7.60%	566
Kern	328	28.20%	777	66.81%	58	4.99%	0	0.00%	0	0.00%	-449	-38.61%	1,163
Lake	340	25.93%	789	60.18%	182	13.88%	0	0.00%	0	0.00%	-449	-34.25%	1,311
Lassen	287	39.10%	424	57.77%	21	2.86%	1	0.14%	1	0.14%	-137	-18.66%	734
Los Angeles	1,930	28.42%	2,743	40.40%	2,093	30.82%	24	0.35%	0	0.00%	-650	-9.57%	6,790
Marin	658	48.13%	322	23.56%	387	28.31%	0	0.00%	0	0.00%	271	19.82%	1,367
Mariposa	317	31.14%	615	60.41%	86	8.45%	0	0.00%	0	0.00%	-298	-29.27%	1,018
Mendocino	752	32.30%	1,398	60.05%	176	7.56%	2	0.09%	0	0.00%	-646	-27.75%	2,328
Merced	343	31.79%	573	53.10%	162	15.01%	1	0.09%	0	0.00%	-230	-21.32%	1,079
Modoc	272	32.11%	565	66.71%	6	0.71%	4	0.47%	0	0.00%	-293	-34.59%	847
Mono	786	47.01%	494	29.55%	391	23.39%	1	0.06%	0	0.00%	292	17.46%	1,672
Monterey	839	35.61%	750	31.83%	767	32.56%	0	0.00%	0	0.00%	72	3.06%	2,356
Napa	960	41.27%	833	35.81%	529	22.74%	4	0.17%	0	0.00%	127	5.46%	2,326
Nevada	1,755	43.06%	824	20.22%	1,496	36.70%	1	0.02%	0	0.00%	259	6.35%	4,076
Placer	1,213	43.32%	759	27.11%	828	29.57%	0	0.00%	0	0.00%	385	13.75%	2,800
Plumas	702	53.79%	500	38.31%	100	7.66%	3	0.23%	0	0.00%	202	15.48%	1,305
Sacramento	3,505	55.65%	1,370	21.75%	1,422	22.58%	1	0.02%	0	0.00%	2,083	33.07%	6,298
San Benito	227	20.71%	621	56.66%	247	22.54%	0	0.00%	1	0.09%	-374	-34.12%	1,096
San Bernardino	509	33.31%	636	41.62%	383	25.07%	0	0.00%	0	0.00%	-127	-8.31%	1,528
San Diego	627	44.37%	678	47.98%	108	7.64%	0	0.00%	0	0.00%	-51	-3.61%	1,413
San Francisco	18,944	45.71%	3,900	9.41%	15,593	44.86%	7	0.02%	0	0.00%	351	0.85%	41,444
San Joaquin	2,078	45.83%	1,838	40.54%	609	13.43%	9	0.20%	0	0.00%	240	5.29%	4,534
San Luis Obispo	631	32.44%	646	33.21%	665	34.19%	3	0.15%	0	0.00%	-19 (Note: Margin over Glenn)	-0.98%	1,945
San Mateo	647	40.62%	424	26.62%	522	32.77%	0	0.00%	0	0.00%	125	7.85%	1,593
Santa Barbara	755	37.01%	689	33.77%	586	28.73%	10	0.49%	0	0.00%	66	3.24%	2,040
Santa Clara	2,703	44.90%	1,329	22.08%	1,988	33.02%	0	0.00%	0	0.00%	715	11.88%	6,020
Santa Cruz	901	36.76%	800	32.64%	750	30.60%	0	0.00%	0	0.00%	101	4.12%	2,451
Shasta	576	35.47%	808	49.75%	240	14.78%	0	0.00%	0	0.00%	-232	-14.29%	1,624
Sierra	826	54.70%	457	30.26%	225	14.90%	2	0.13%	0	0.00%	369	24.44%	1,510
Siskiyou	666	39.20%	917	53.97%	116	6.83%	0	0.00%	0	0.00%	-251	-14.77%	1,699
Solano	1,625	43.86%	918	24.78%	1,162	31.36%	0	0.00%	0	0.00%	463	12.50%	3,705
Sonoma	1,611	33.77%	2,523	52.88%	620	13.00%	17	0.36%	0	0.00%	-912	-19.12%	4,771
Stanislaus	593	35.64%	994	59.74%	74	4.45%	3	0.18%	0	0.00%	-401	-24.10%	1,664
Sutter	670	52.92%	470	37.12%	121	9.56%	5	0.39%	0	0.00%	200	15.80%	1,266
Tehama	517	34.63%	864	57.87%	112	7.50%	0	0.00%	0	0.00%	-347	-23.24%	1,493
Trinity	430	47.62%	307	34.00%	152	16.83%	14	1.55%	0	0.00%	123	13.62%	903
Tulare	611	29.70%	1,259	61.21%	186	9.04%	1	0.05%	0	0.00%	-648	-31.50%	2,057
Tuolumne	738	42.98%	579	33.72%	400	23.30%	0	0.00%	0	0.00%	159	9.26%	1,717
Ventura	321	26.62%	737	61.11%	148	12.27%	0	0.00%	0	0.00%	-416	-34.49%	1,206
Yolo	1,027	40.71%	1,164	46.14%	332	13.16%	0	0.00%	0	0.00%	-137	-5.43%	2,523
Yuba	1,073	48.93%	594	27.09%	525	23.94%	1	0.05%	0	0.00%	479	21.84%	2,193
Total	67,965	42.42%	47,647	29.74%	44,482	27.76%	119	0.07%	2	0.00%	20,318	12.68%	160,215

==== Counties that flipped from Democratic to Republican ====
- Alameda
- Butte
- Calaveras
- Del Norte
- El Dorado
- Marin
- Monterey
- Napa
- Nevada
- Plumas
- Sacramento
- San Francisco
- Santa Barbara
- Santa Clara
- Santa Cruz
- Solano
- Sutter
- Trinity
- Tuolumne
- Yuba

==== Counties that flipped from Independent to Republican ====
- Alpine
- Mono
- Sierra

==== Counties that flipped from Independent to Democratic ====
- Lassen

==== Counties that flipped from Republican to Workingmen's ====
- Humboldt

==== Counties that flipped from Democratic to Workingmen's ====
- San Luis Obispo
