= George C. Perkins =

American politician

- Portrait by Harris & Ewing c. 1905–1915

United States Senator from California
- In office July 26, 1893 – March 3, 1915
- Appointed by: Henry Markham
- Preceded by: Leland Stanford
- Succeeded by: James D. Phelan

14th Governor of California
- In office January 8, 1880 – January 10, 1883
- Lieutenant: John Mansfield
- Preceded by: William Irwin
- Succeeded by: George Stoneman

Member of the California Senate from the 24th district
- In office November 5, 1872 – January 8, 1873
- Preceded by: David Boucher
- Succeeded by: William C. Hendricks
- In office December 6, 1869 – December 8, 1871
- Preceded by: Multi-member district
- Succeeded by: David Boucher

Personal details
- Born: August 23, 1839 Kennebunkport, Maine, U.S.
- Died: February 26, 1923 (aged 83) Oakland, California, U.S.
- Party: Republican
- Spouse: Ruth Parker
- Children: 7
- Profession: Entrepreneur

George Clement Perkins (August 23, 1839 – February 26, 1923) was an American businessman and politician. A member of the Republican Party, Perkins served as the 14th governor of California from 1880 to 1883, and as United States senator from California from 1893 to 1915. He also served in the California State Senate.

== Early life ==
Perkins was born in 1839 in Kennebunkport, Maine, the son of Lucinda (Fairfield) and Clement Perkins. Perkins ran away to sea at age twelve, eventually arriving in San Francisco in 1855. After making an unsuccessful effort at staking a mining claim in Butte County, Perkins worked a succession of jobs in Sacramento and the mining town of Oroville, including driving a mule team and working as a store clerk. Perkins eventually bought the Oroville store he clerked at, and was soon grossing $500,000 a year.

Perkins was elected to California State Senate in 1869, representing Butte County. While in serving in the Senate in Sacramento, Perkins met businessman Charles Goodall, with whom Perkins would form what would become the Pacific Coast Steamship Company.

Leaving his Oroville business to be operated by his brother, Perkins moved to San Francisco in 1875 and expanded his interests in the shipping industry.

== Political career ==
Portrait by I. W. Taber, 1880

Perkins was the Republican nominee for governor in 1879 and ran a successful campaign emphasizing his purported independence from railroad interests given his interests in shipping, a competing industry. During his term, former Civil War general John Mansfield served as his lieutenant governor.

Perkins was appointed to the Senate by governor Henry Markham in 1893 following the death of Leland Stanford. As a Senator, Perkins was a part of the powerful Southern Pacific political machine, commonly called the Southern Pacific Political Bureau, headed by Southern Pacific chief counsel William F. Herrin.

Perkins is buried alongside his wife Ruth Parker Perkins in Mountain View Cemetery in Oakland, California.

== Personal life ==
Perkins married Ruth Parker, the daughter of his business partner Edward Parker, on May 3, 1864, in Marysville. Born in 1843 in County Cork, Ireland, she immigrated to California with her family at age eight. An avid reader of poetry, Ruth Perkins had several poems of her own published in magazines and newspapers. She died on February 4, 1921, in Oakland, California.

Perkins and his wife Ruth had seven children. Mount Perkins in California is named after him.

Party political offices
Preceded by Timothy Guy Phelps	Republican nominee for Governor of California; 1879	Succeeded by Morris M. Estee
U.S. Senate
Preceded by Amasa Leland Stanford	U.S. Senator (Class 3) from California; 1893–1915; Served alongside: Stephen M. White, Thomas R. Bard, Frank P. Flint, John D. Works	Succeeded by James D. Phelan
Political offices
Preceded by William Irwin	Governor of California; 1880–1883	Succeeded by George Stoneman
