= 1910 California gubernatorial election =

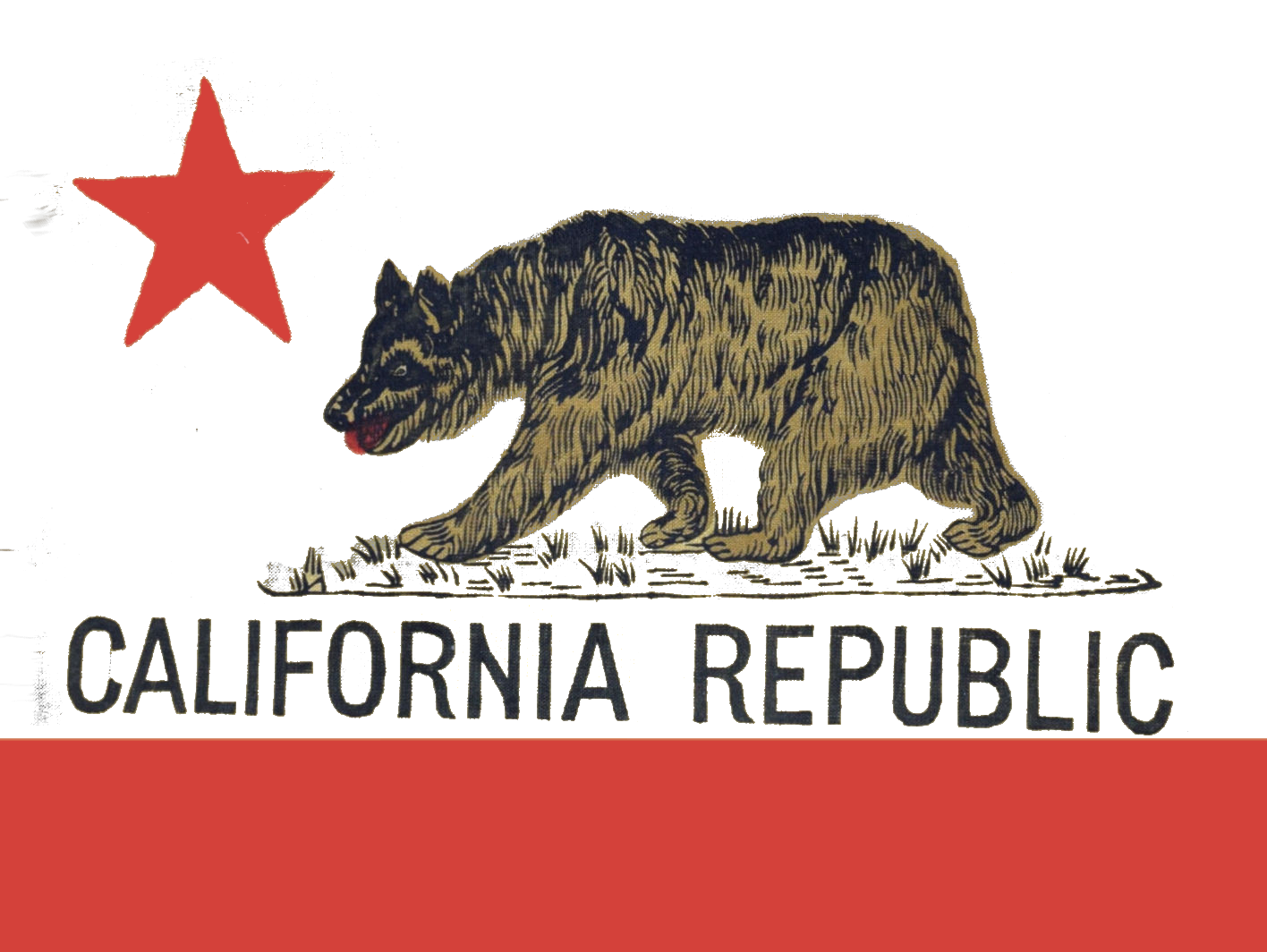
- November 8, 1910
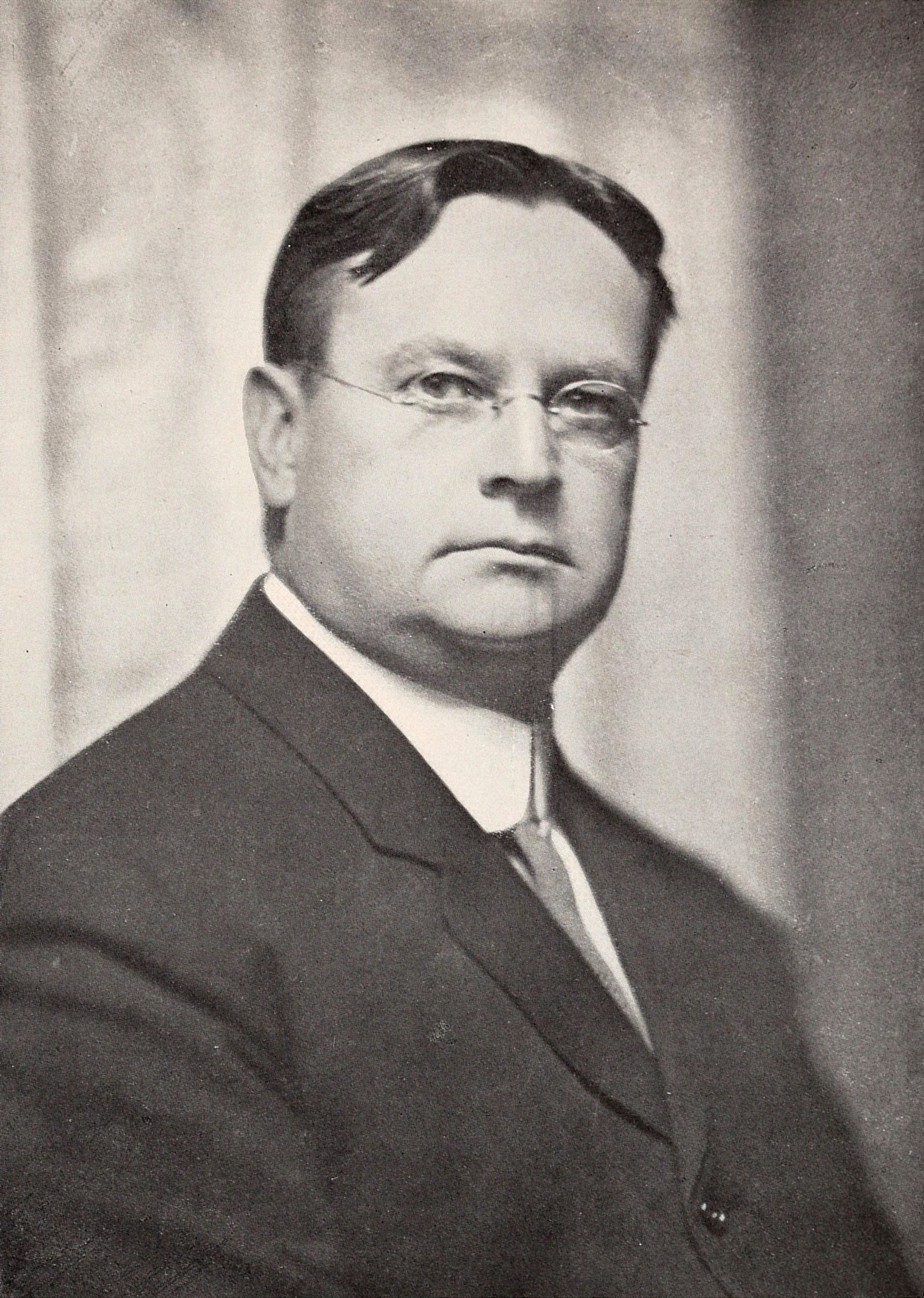

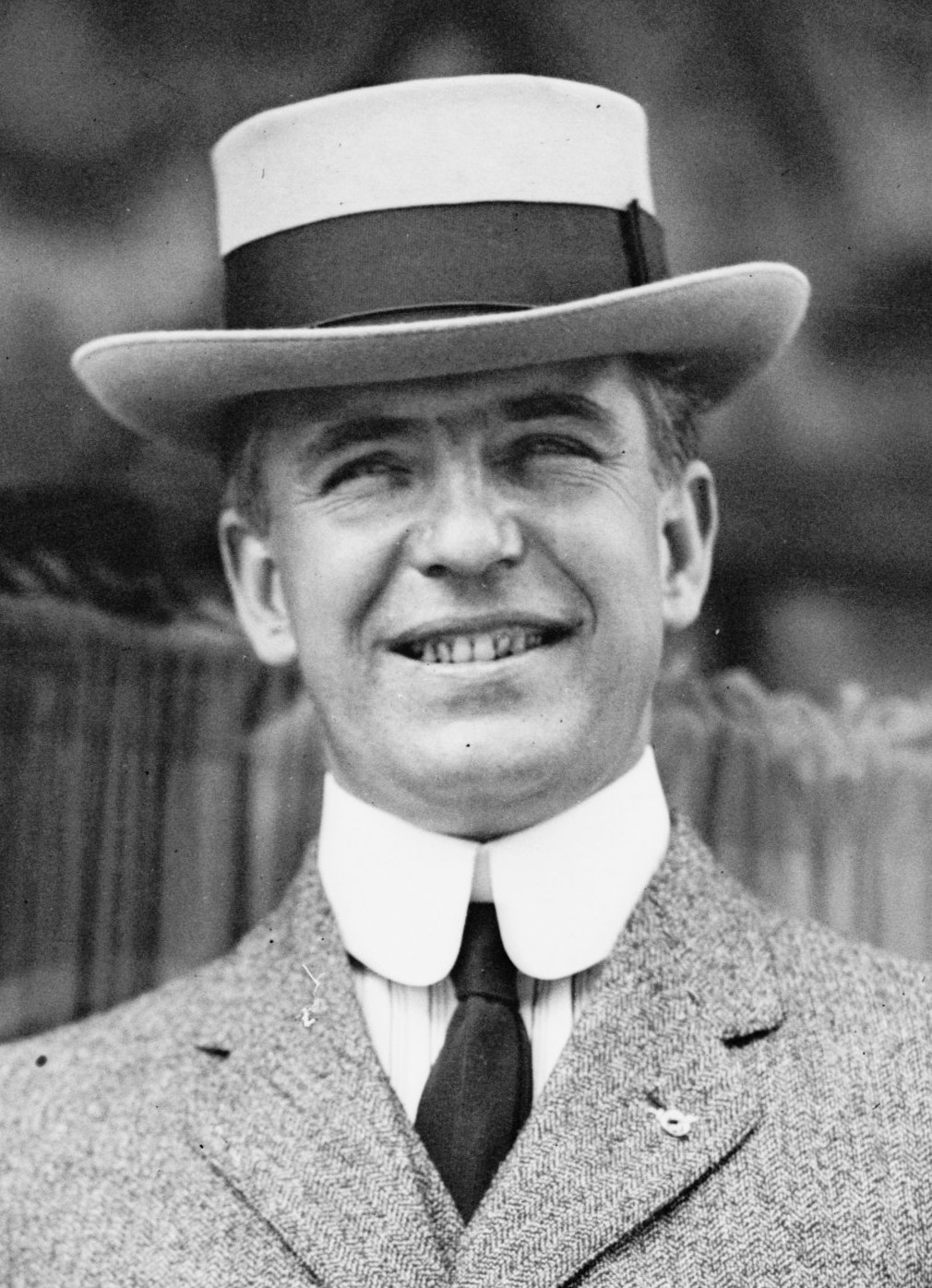

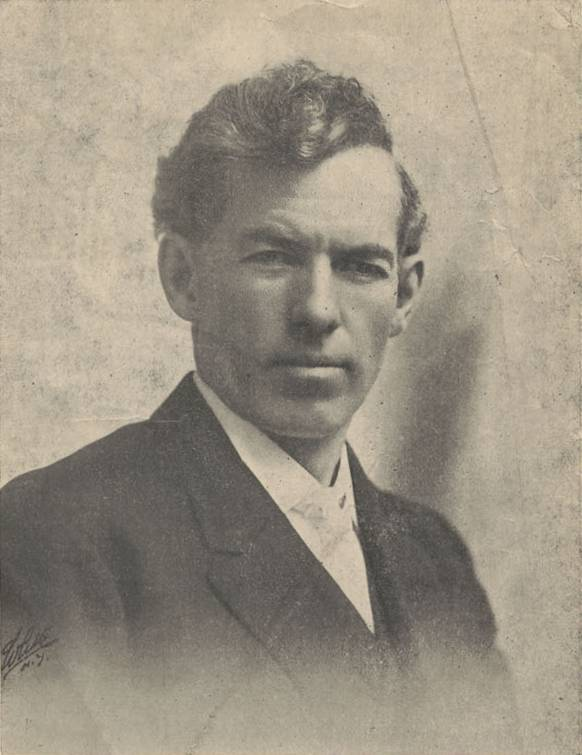
Nominee	Hiram Johnson	Theodore Arlington Bell	J. Stitt Wilson
Party	Republican	Democratic	Socialist
Popular vote	177,191	154,835	47,819
Percentage	45.94%	40.14%	12.40%
- County results Johnson: 40–50% 50–60% 80–90% Bell: 40–50% 50–60% 60–70%
Governor before election
James Gillett
Republican
Elected Governor
Hiram Johnson
Republican

The 1910 California gubernatorial election was held on November 8, 1910. Incumbent Republican governor James Gillett opted not to seek re-election to a second term in office. Hiram Johnson defeated Theodore Arlington Bell and J. Stitt Wilson to win the open race.

Primary elections were held on August 16. Johnson won the Republican nomination over three conservative opponents. Bell won the Democratic nomination for a second consecutive race over Thomas J. Geary.

Johnson won the election with 45.9 percent of the popular vote. This was the first gubernatorial election in which Fresno, Modoc, San Benito, Stanislaus, and Tulare counties voted for a Republican candidate. These Republican gains foreshadowed the party's future dominance of California elections, which would persist through 1954 with only one interruption.

== Background ==
Incumbent governor James Gillett was elected on the Republican ticket in 1906. Gillett's nomination at the party convention was controversial, and during the general election campaign he was consistently accused of being in the pocket of the Southern Pacific Railroad. Despite this, he had been successful as governor, leading in the creation of the state's highway system and developing parole guidelines. However, he was suffering financially and decided not to seek a second term. He instead opted to pursue private legal practice.

His intentions were made clear on January 30, when he announced through a published letter to the California Republican Party that he would not seek the nomination because, "It is for the best interest of myself and family that I should again resume the practice of my profession, and I can not well afford to continue in the office of governor for another, period of four years."

This was the first election held following the adoption of new primary election laws, which established closed primaries for both major parties.

== Republican primary ==
=== Candidates ===
- Alden Anderson, former lieutenant governor and Speaker of the California State Assembly
- Charles F. Curry, Secretary of State of California since 1899
- Nathaniel Ellery
- Hiram Johnson, San Francisco attorney and reform activist
- Phillip A. Stanton, speaker of the California State Assembly

==== Withdrew ====
- Charles M. Belshaw, former assemblyman from Contra Costa County (endorsed Johnson)
- Frank K. Mott, mayor of Oakland (endorsed Johnson)

==== Declined ====
- William Rude Davis, former mayor of Oakland
- James Gillett, incumbent governor since 1907 (declined January 30, 1910)
- Francis J. Heney, prosecutor in the San Francisco graft trials
- Chester Rowell, mayor of Fresno

=== Campaign ===
After Gillett's announcement, there were multiple candidates contending for the Republican nomination. The most prominent was Charles F. Curry, the secretary of state for California and early favorite. Curry was so confident of victory that he predicted he would be the next governor on the same day that Gillett's announcement was made. Oakland mayor Frank K. Mott and Francis J. Heney, who had led the San Francisco graft prosecutions of 1906–08, considered runs. Hiram Johnson, Chester Rowell, and William R. Davis all announced that they were not seeking the nomination.

==== Lincoln–Roosevelt League endorsement ====
The Lincoln–Roosevelt League, a faction representing progressive elements of the Republican Party, struggled to find a candidate. The league initially tried to draft Hiram Johnson, but he rejected their support, and the League split between supporters of Charles M. Belshaw or former Oakland mayor William Rude Davis. In early February, it was reported that the League was instead split between Belshaw and Davis's successor, Frank K. Mott.

On February 20, Hiram Johnson announced that he would run under the banner of the Lincoln-Roosevelt League. He stated,

"It seems to be my turn to make the sacrifice and I am going to make it. For two months, the utmost pressure has been brought to bear upon me. I had steadfastly refused to become a candidate, but it was placed before me in such a fashion that I was forced to fail in my duty or accept. So I am going ahead, making the fight as a progressive Republican on the Roosevelt lines. I am going to make this fight an endeavor to return the government of California to the people and take it away from the political bureau of the Southern Pacific railway company. If nothing else can be accomplished, we can teach the people the lesson talked by our last president and that is being talked today to the people of the United States by [Wisconsin senator Robert] La Follette."

Shortly after Johnson's announcement, former governor George Pardee endorsed him.

==== Johnson campaign against conservatives ====
Having secured the support of the progressive faction, Johnson faced three leading opponents (Curry, Alden Anderson, and Phillip A. Stanton) from the conservative wing of the party.

One major obstacle to the Johnson campaign was the state's new primary law; although popular primaries were a progressive reform, the closed nature of the party primary required voters to register with a party in order to cast a ballot. Johnson supporters worked to convince independents to register as Republicans in order to cast a ballot for him.

Johnson began making plans for a tour of California in late February, intending to visit every part of the state. He launched his campaign in Southern California, where he visited Long Beach, inspected Los Angeles Harbor and hosted an informal Los Angeles reception. Albert Joseph Wallace, the former chair of the Los Angeles City Council committee on finance, was chosen as Johnson's running mate.

On March 20, the Asiatic Exclusion League hosted a candidate forum on the "Japanese question." Curry strongly declared his support, while Anderson and Johnson declined the invitation with regrets.

The conservative faction of the Republican Party was not popular, and the League campaigned on a challenge to the status quo. Johnson's barnstorming tour pulled in huge crowds across the state, while his opponents struggled to consolidate the conservative vote and gain momentum. Johnson received support from some Hispanic Americans and was endorsed by Alfonso E. Garcia, president of the Hispano-American Republican League.

By the time of the primary election, newspapers across the state considered Johnson the likely nominee.

=== Results ===
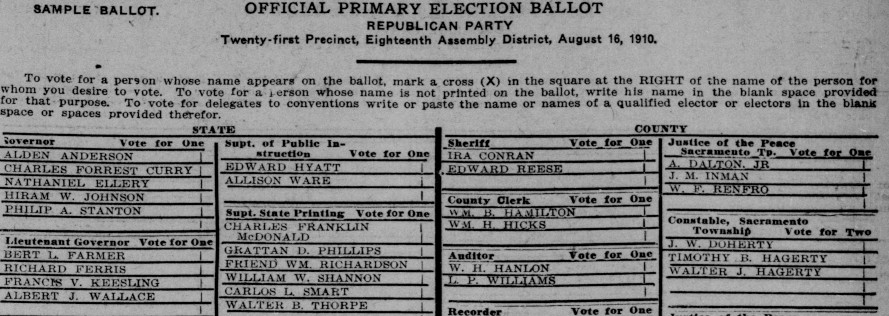
Sample ballot for the Republican Party primary in Sacramento, California. 1910

Johnson won the nomination.

== Democratic primary ==
=== Candidates ===
- Theodore Arlington Bell, former U.S. representative from St. Helena and nominee in 1906
- Thomas J. Geary, former U.S. representative from Santa Rosa
- John B. Sanford, state senator from Ukiah

The three main candidates for the Democratic nomination were former runner up and congressman Theodore Arlington Bell, former congressman Thomas J. Geary, and State Senator John B. Sanford.

On March 10, Theodore Bell announced his candidacy for governor in San Francisco. Bell ran on an anti-railroad platform. On May 28, he visited the town of Hanford, California, where he was interviewed by a reporter. In the interview he blamed the Independence Party and William Langdon for splitting the Democratic vote in his loss of the 1906 California gubernatorial election. He also stated he did not believe that anyone would seriously challenge him for the Democratic nomination. Bell was proven correct when it was reported that the California Democratic Committee was not seeing any contests for the major state nominations.

During the primary, Bell was the only candidate who attended the Asiatic Exclusion League candidate forum on March 30 without expressing his support for immigration exclusion.

=== Results ===
Bell won the primary, and Timothy Spellacy was nominated for lieutenant governor.

== General election ==
=== Candidates ===
- Theodore Arlington Bell, former U.S. representative from St. Helena and nominee in 1906 (Democratic)
- Hiram Johnson, San Francisco attorney and reform activist (Republican)
- Simone P. Meads, Oakland schoolteacher and author (Prohibition)
- J. Stitt Wilson, Christian socialist activist and orator (Socialist)

Simone P. Meads of the Prohibition Party ran on a platform supporting the public ownership of utilities, women's suffrage, and the implementation of referendum, reform, and recall ballot measures.

=== Campaign ===
An appeal for Bell in the San Francisco News Letter, November 5, 1910

After both the August 16 primaries, Bell and Johnson emerged as the top two choices for the governorship. Both candidates agreed on the primary issue in the campaign, which was opposition to the Southern Pacific railroad corporation and its influence on politics. Johnson's victory undermined Bell's message, which had been aimed at the incumbent Gillett administration and Johnson's primary opponents. Newspapers across California favored Johnson.

Bell and Johnson were challenged by Christian socialist J. Stitt Wilson, who travelled the state in a red automobile nicknamed the "Red Special", a direct reference to the train that party leader Eugene V. Debs had traveled on during the 1908 presidential election. Wilson ran a vigorous campaign relying on his reputation for oratory, and he challenged the other candidates to debate. Debs also visited the state and campaigned for Wilson over two weeks.

Both candidates also agreed on the prevention of Japanese and Chinese immigration. During the primaries, Johnson had declined a request to attend a candidate forum hosted by the Asiatic Exclusion League, expressing regret over his absence. Bell had been the lone candidate in either party to attend but decline to declare his support for the League. Bell made his position clear on the topic during a speech in Watsonville, stating that he wanted to "prevent the invasion of the yellow, brown and Hindu hordes." Bell continued,

"I shall also stand for a state law to prevent Asiatics from gaining ownership of land in this state and, thirdly, I propose to make it impossible for Asiatics to sit in the same schools with your child and my child. I don't care whether it loses me a vote or not, but I'm against the whole bunch of them. I want to see this country for white men and populated by people willing to go out and fight for our flag."

Johnson later proposed and signed the California Alien Land Law of 1913, introducing such restrictions on foreign ownership of California land into law.

Towards the end of the campaign, Bell and Johnson attacked each other for their respective prior relationships with the Southern Pacific and other corporate entities. Days before the election, Johnson supporters alleged that the Southern Pacific had ordered employees to vote for Bell, supporting their claim that Bell would be lenient on the railroad and its allies.

In the final days of the campaign, newspapers predicted that Hiram Johnson would win the election.

=== Results ===
1910 gubernatorial election, California
Party	Candidate	Votes	%	±%
Republican	Hiram W. Johnson	177,191	45.94%	▲5.59
Democratic	Theodore Arlington Bell	154,835	40.14%	▲2.43
Socialist	J. Stitt Wilson	47,819	12.40%	▲7.26
Prohibition	Simeon P. Meads	5,807	1.51%	▼0.85
	Scattering	61	0.02%	
Majority		22,356	5.80%	
Total votes		385,713	100.00%	
Republican hold		Swing	+3.15%	

=== Results by county ===
County	Hiram W. Johnson Republican		Theodore A. Bell Democratic		J. Stitt Wilson Socialist		Simeon P. Meads Prohibition		Scattering Write-in		Margin		Total votes cast
County	#	%	#	%	#	%	#	%	#	%	#	%	Total votes cast
Alameda	15,826	49.46%	9,821	30.69%	5,743	17.95%	610	1.91%	0	0.00%	6,005	18.77%	32,000
Alpine	65	87.84%	9	12.16%	0	0.00%	0	0.00%	0	0.00%	56	75.68%	74
Amador	1,000	46.64%	1,100	51.31%	40	1.87%	4	0.19%	0	0.00%	-100	-4.66%	2,144
Butte	2,692	46.17%	2,507	43.00%	549	9.42%	78	1.34%	4	0.07%	185	3.17%	5,830
Calaveras	1,037	43.74%	1,127	47.53%	187	7.89%	20	0.84%	0	0.00%	-90	-3.80%	2,371
Colusa	649	32.53%	1,313	65.81%	27	1.35%	6	0.30%	0	0.00%	-664	-33.28%	1,995
Contra Costa	2,603	46.45%	2,319	41.38%	639	11.40%	43	0.77%	0	0.00%	284	5.07%	5,604
Del Norte	390	51.18%	316	41.47%	49	6.43%	7	0.92%	0	0.00%	74	9.71%	762
El Dorado	810	40.72%	1,072	53.90%	102	5.13%	5	0.25%	0	0.00%	-262	-13.17%	1,989
Fresno	6,200	47.54%	5,455	41.83%	1,185	9.09%	201	1.54%	0	0.00%	745	5.71%	13,041
Glenn	585	36.86%	955	60.18%	35	2.21%	12	0.76%	0	0.00%	-370	-23.31%	1,587
Humboldt	3,050	49.89%	1,688	27.61%	1,324	21.66%	47	0.77%	4	0.07%	1,362	22.28%	6,113
Imperial	1,106	47.55%	801	34.44%	366	15.74%	53	2.28%	0	0.00%	305	13.11%	2,326
Inyo	582	41.51%	634	45.22%	157	11.20%	29	2.07%	0	0.00%	-52	-3.71%	1,402
Kern	2,680	40.19%	3,410	51.13%	548	8.22%	31	0.46%	0	0.00%	-730	-10.95%	6,669
Kings	1,500	50.05%	1,149	38.34%	305	10.18%	43	1.43%	0	0.00%	351	11.71%	2,997
Lake	570	39.97%	744	52.17%	83	5.82%	29	2.03%	0	0.00%	-174	-12.20%	1,426
Lassen	622	54.04%	437	37.97%	87	7.56%	5	0.43%	0	0.00%	185	16.07%	1,151
Los Angeles	30,513	45.78%	23,051	34.58%	11,129	16.70%	1,929	2.89%	34	0.05%	7,462	11.19%	66,656
Madera	750	44.75%	777	46.36%	140	8.35%	9	0.54%	0	0.00%	-27	-1.61%	1,676
Marin	1,955	46.60%	1,897	45.22%	335	7.99%	8	0.19%	0	0.00%	58	1.38%	4,195
Mariposa	403	39.78%	562	55.48%	41	4.05%	7	0.69%	0	0.00%	-159	-15.70%	1,013
Mendocino	2,119	44.63%	2,259	47.58%	338	7.12%	32	0.67%	0	0.00%	-140	-2.95%	4,748
Merced	1,212	43.29%	1,311	46.82%	217	7.75%	59	2.11%	1	0.04%	-99	-3.54%	2,800
Modoc	635	50.56%	590	46.97%	25	1.99%	6	0.48%	0	0.00%	45	3.58%	1,256
Mono	230	55.29%	156	37.50%	28	6.73%	1	0.24%	1	0.24%	74	17.79%	416
Monterey	2,580	55.16%	1,839	39.32%	159	3.40%	98	2.10%	1	0.02%	741	15.84%	4,677
Napa	1,629	38.46%	2,372	56.00%	212	5.00%	23	0.54%	0	0.00%	-743	-17.54%	4,236
Nevada	1,398	43.20%	1,290	39.86%	531	16.41%	17	0.53%	0	0.00%	108	3.34%	3,236
Orange	3,026	46.94%	2,695	41.80%	467	7.24%	259	4.02%	0	0.00%	331	5.13%	6,447
Placer	1,560	46.06%	1,603	47.33%	187	5.52%	36	1.06%	1	0.03%	-43	-1.27%	3,387
Plumas	622	56.04%	423	38.11%	61	5.50%	4	0.36%	0	0.00%	199	17.93%	1,110
Riverside	3,026	51.64%	1,914	32.66%	690	11.77%	228	3.89%	2	0.03%	1,112	18.98%	5,860
Sacramento	5,217	42.44%	6,033	49.08%	994	8.09%	49	0.40%	0	0.00%	-816	-6.64%	12,293
San Benito	915	48.59%	874	46.42%	74	3.93%	20	1.06%	0	0.00%	41	2.18%	1,883
San Bernardino	4,111	45.06%	3,611	39.58%	1,025	11.23%	377	4.13%	0	0.00%	500	5.48%	9,124
San Diego	4,514	47.62%	2,966	31.29%	1,870	19.73%	129	1.36%	0	0.00%	1,548	16.33%	9,479
San Francisco	25,528	43.13%	24,065	40.66%	9,476	16.01%	113	0.19%	0	0.00%	1,463	2.47%	59,182
San Joaquin	3,969	45.32%	3,851	43.98%	851	9.72%	86	0.98%	0	0.00%	118	1.35%	8,757
San Luis Obispo	2,121	50.95%	1,285	30.87%	726	17.44%	31	0.74%	0	0.00%	836	20.08%	4,163
San Mateo	2,389	49.42%	1,828	37.82%	599	12.39%	17	0.35%	1	0.02%	561	11.61%	4,834
Santa Barbara	2,334	49.24%	1,995	42.09%	366	7.72%	43	0.91%	2	0.04%	339	7.15%	4,740
Santa Clara	7,078	49.66%	5,416	38.00%	1,513	10.62%	240	1.68%	5	0.04%	1,662	11.66%	14,252
Santa Cruz	2,508	54.63%	1,706	37.16%	291	6.34%	86	1.87%	0	0.00%	802	17.47%	4,591
Shasta	1,723	46.02%	1,606	42.90%	398	10.63%	16	0.43%	1	0.03%	117	3.13%	3,744
Sierra	542	55.53%	385	39.45%	47	4.82%	2	0.20%	0	0.00%	157	16.09%	976
Siskiyou	1,630	42.78%	1,910	50.13%	251	6.59%	19	0.50%	0	0.00%	-280	-7.35%	3,810
Solano	2,301	39.13%	2,919	49.63%	611	10.39%	50	0.85%	0	0.00%	-618	-10.51%	5,881
Sonoma	3,976	43.66%	4,178	45.88%	876	9.62%	76	0.83%	0	0.00%	-202	-2.22%	9,106
Stanislaus	1,992	45.14%	1,798	40.74%	324	7.34%	297	6.73%	2	0.05%	194	4.40%	4,413
Sutter	845	51.68%	746	45.63%	32	1.96%	12	0.73%	0	0.00%	99	6.06%	1,635
Tehama	1,094	43.48%	1,184	47.06%	211	8.39%	27	1.07%	0	0.00%	-90	-3.58%	2,516
Trinity	484	49.74%	388	39.88%	100	10.28%	0	0.00%	1	0.10%	96	9.87%	973
Tulare	3,113	46.92%	2,877	43.36%	574	8.65%	71	1.07%	0	0.00%	236	3.56%	6,635
Tuolumne	1,080	44.72%	1,179	48.82%	136	5.63%	20	0.83%	0	0.00%	-99	-4.10%	2,415
Ventura	1,696	48.82%	1,545	44.47%	192	5.53%	41	1.18%	0	0.00%	151	4.35%	3,474
Yolo	1,466	41.40%	1,804	50.95%	233	6.58%	38	1.07%	0	0.00%	-338	-9.55%	3,541
Yuba	940	44.72%	1,090	51.86%	63	3.00%	8	0.38%	1	0.05%	-150	-7.14%	2,102
Total	177,191	45.94%	154,835	40.14%	47,819	12.40%	5,807	1.51%	61	0.02%	22,356	5.80%	385,713

==== Counties that flipped from Democratic to Republican ====
- Butte
- Fresno
- Lassen
- Modoc
- Nevada
- Plumas
- San Benito
- San Joaquin
- Luis Obispo
- Santa Cruz
- Shasta
- Sierra
- Stanislaus
- Sutter
- Tulare

==== Counties that flipped from Republican to Democratic ====
- Calaveras
- Mendocino

==== Counties that flipped from Independence to Democratic ====
- Inyo
