= Dockweiler (surname) =

- Heinrich Dockweiler (Henry Dockweiler) — Bavarian emigrant, early Los Angeles pioneer and politician.
- Isidore B. Dockweiler — Los Angeles lawyer and California politician
- John F. Dockweiler — Los Angeles lawyer and California congressperson: 74th–75th Congresses (1933–1939)

== See also ==
- Dockweiler (disambiguation)
