= James K. Burnett =

California politician

Member of the California State Assembly from the 67th district
- In office January 4, 1897 – January 1, 1901
- Preceded by: J. H. Glass
- Succeeded by: Warren M. John

Personal details
- Born: James Kennedy Burnett; January 24, 1862 San Luis Obispo County, California, U.S.
- Died: September 14, 1948 (age 86) San Luis Obispo County, California, U.S.
- Party: Democratic
- Spouse: Josephine LaBelle

James Kennedy Burnett (January 24, 1862 - September 14, 1948) was a California politician who served in the California State Assembly from the 67th district between 1897 and 1901. In 1899, when Speaker of the Assembly Howard E. Wright was plagued with scandals involving vote-buying and forging campaign documents, the penalty for the latter being forfeiture of office, Burnett introduced an expulsion resolution before Wright resigned his office.
