= Walter J. Little =

American politician

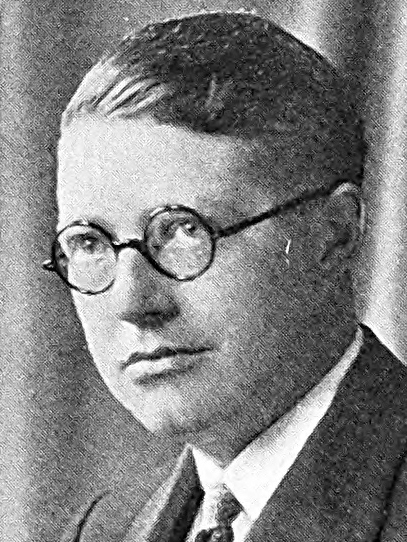
- Official portrait, 1932

43rd Speaker of the California State Assembly
- In office January 1933 – July 1933
- Preceded by: Edgar C. Levey
- Succeeded by: Forsythe Charles Clowdsley

Member of the California State Assembly
- In office January 2, 1933 – March 29, 1934
- Preceded by: Willis M. Baum
- Succeeded by: Geoffrey F. Morgan
- Constituency: 60th district
- In office January 5, 1931 – January 2, 1933
- Preceded by: Robert Lincoln Patterson
- Succeeded by: Bert V. Callahan
- Constituency: 56th district
- In office January 5, 1925 – January 5, 1931
- Preceded by: Hugh R. Pomeroy
- Succeeded by: Frederick Madison Roberts
- Constituency: 62nd district

Personal details
- Born: Walter J. Little; September 13, 1894 Hammond, Indiana
- Died: October 11, 1960 (aged 66) Los Angeles, California
- Party: Republican
- Spouse(s): Mable McNeely (m. 1917); Dorothy Cox (m. 1946)
- Children: 2

Military service
- Branch/service: United States Army
- Battles/wars: World War I

Walter James Little (September 13, 1894 – October 11, 1960) was a Republican politician who served in the California State Assembly for the 56th, 60th and 62nd districts from 1925 to 1934, and served as its Speaker in 1933. He served in the United States Army during World War I.

California Assembly
Preceded by Hugh R. Pomeroy	California State Assemblyman, 62nd District; January 5, 1925 – January 5, 1931	Succeeded by Frederick Madison Roberts
Preceded by Robert Lincoln Patterson	California State Assemblyman, 56th District; January 5, 1931 – January 5, 1933	Succeeded by Bert V. Callahan
Preceded by Willis M. Baum	California State Assemblyman, 60th District; January 2, 1933 – March 29, 1934	Succeeded by Forsythe Charles Clowdsley
Political offices
Preceded by Edgar C. Levey	Speaker of the California State Assembly; January 1933 – July 1933	Succeeded by James W. Silliman
