= Mike Bryte =

American sheriff (1828–1887)

Michael Bryte

11th Sheriff of Sacramento County
- In office 1872–1874
- Preceded by: Joseph S. Woods
- Succeeded by: Hugh McElroy LaRue

Personal details
- Born: June 25, 1828 Ashland County, Ohio, U.S.
- Died: February 3, 1887 (age 59)
- Spouse: Elizabeth
- Children: 10
- Occupation: Sheriff, pioneer, dairy farmer
- Known for: California pioneer

Michael Bryte (June 25, 1828 – February 3, 1887) was a California pioneer and dairy farmer. He also served two terms as the Sheriff of Sacramento County.

== Biography ==
Bryte was born in Clear Creek Township, Ashland County, Ohio in 1828. He moved to California in 1849 or 1850 to find gold but eventually started working for a dairyman named Schaadt, and in 1855 married his daughter Elizabeth. He purchased Schaadt's dairy in 1853 and renamed it Ashland Dairy, which proved to be a successful endeavor in part due to Bryte using California Steam Navigation Company steamships to transport products to other regional markets. By 1879 Bryte owned over 1,500 acres of land and farmed 2,500 acres in Sacramento County.

Bryte served on the Yolo County Board of Supervisors, and served two terms as the Sheriff of Sacramento County between 1872 and 1874, beating incumbent sheriff Joseph S. Woods. During his tenure as Sheriff, the Sacramento County Sheriff's Department arrested and hanged notorious stalker and murderer Charles "Mortimer" Flinn.

In 1910, Bryte's son George would sell the family dairy farm, and it would be turned into the community of Riverbank, now known as Bryte, California, named after the family.
