= Nicholas C. Petris =

American politician

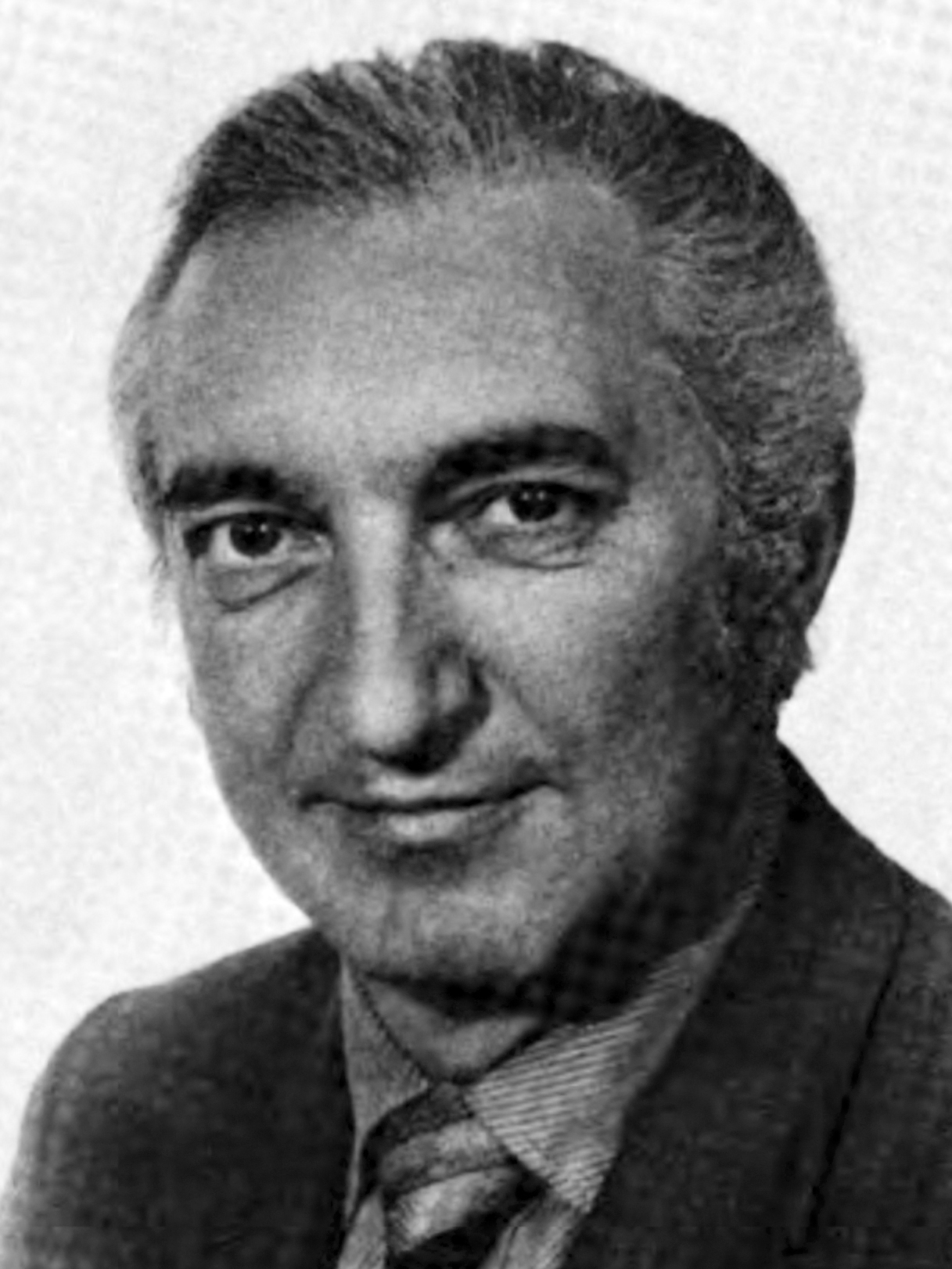
- Official portrait, 1975

Member of the California Senate from the 9th district
- In office December 6, 1976 – November 30, 1996
- Preceded by: Milton Marks
- Succeeded by: Barbara Lee

Member of the California Senate from the 11th district
- In office January 2, 1967 – November 30, 1976
- Preceded by: Samuel R. Geddes
- Succeeded by: Al Alquist

Member of the California State Assembly from the 15th district
- In office January 5, 1959 – January 2, 1967
- Preceded by: Luther H. Lincoln
- Succeeded by: March Fong Eu

Personal details
- Born: February 25, 1923 Oakland, California, U.S.
- Died: March 20, 2013 (aged 90) Oakland, California, U.S.
- Party: Democratic
- Spouse: Anna Vlahos (m. 1951)
- Education: University of California, Berkeley; Stanford Law School

Military service
- Branch/service: Office of Strategic Services
- Battles/wars: World War II

Nicholas Christos Petris (February 25, 1923 – March 20, 2013) was an American politician who served as a California State Senator from 1966 until 1996. A Democrat, he represented the 11th district from 1966 to 1976 and the 9th district from 1976 until he was termed out in 1996. He was previously in the California State Assembly, representing the 15th district from 1958 until 1966.

== Personal life and education ==
Petris was born in Oakland, California. He received his bachelor's degree from University of California, Berkeley and his law degree from Stanford Law School. He was classmates and friends with Warren Christopher, Secretary of State under President Bill Clinton. During the late 1960s and early 1970s, when Greece was governed by a dictatorship, he took a stand against it as an honorary Chairman of the California Committee for Democracy in Greece.

== Legislative career ==
Petris dedicated substantial energy and resources toward expanding the University of California system. He was also the co-author of the Lanterman–Petris–Short Act, which brought changes to the mental health system in California. Petris also led many conservation initiatives. He was a supporter and advocate of Save the Bay, a nonprofit organization that was successful in restricting and managing land development around the San Francisco Bay. He was a co-sponsor of the McAteer–Petris Act, which established and governs operations of the San Francisco Bay Conservation and Development Commission (BCDC). He also introduced an unsuccessful bill to ban DDT.

During his terms in the State Assembly, Petris became concerned with constituent reports about air pollution. After his election to the State Senate, Petris introduced a bill to the Senate transportation committee in March 1967 which would have limited families to owning a single gasoline-powered car starting in 1975. Although it received little support, he modified the language of the bill to instead ban the sale of gasoline-powered cars from 1975 onward. In March 1969, Petris re-introduced the bill in the Senate's health committee, where it received a unanimous endorsement and grassroots support. The bill passed in the State Senate, but failed by a single vote in the State Assembly. Petris later supported emissions regulations by the California Air Resources Board, which forced auto manufacturers to adopt the catalytic converter.

== Legacy ==
Locations named after Petris include:

- The Nicholas C. Petris Center on Health Care Markets & Consumer Welfare at UC Berkeley
- The Nicholas C. Petris Lecture (started in 2001) at San Francisco State University
- The California Department of Transportation Building at 111 Grand Ave., Oakland, California.

California Senate
Preceded by Milton Marks	California State Senator -- Ninth District; December 6, 1976 – November 30, 1996	Succeeded by Barbara Lee
Preceded by Samuel R. Geddes	California State Senator -- 11th District; January 2, 1967 – November 30,1976	Succeeded by Al Alquist
