= Phillip A. Stanton =

American politician

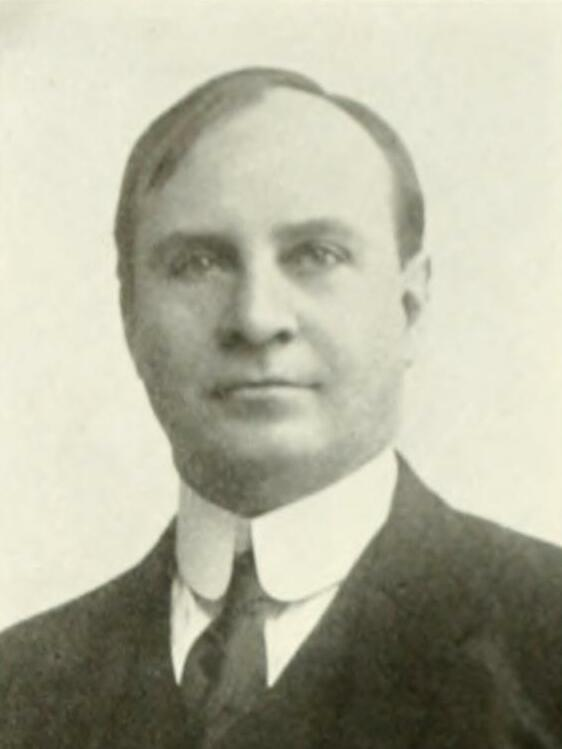
- Stanton in 1912

37th Speaker of the California State Assembly
- In office January 4, 1909 – October 5, 1910
- Preceded by: Robert L. Beardslee Sr.
- Succeeded by: Arthur Hathaway Hewitt

Member of the California State Assembly from the 71st district
- In office January 5, 1903 – January 2, 1911
- Preceded by: Howard A. Broughton
- Succeeded by: Lyman Farwell

Personal details
- Born: Philip Ackley Stanton; February 4, 1868 Cleveland, Ohio, U.S.
- Died: September 1945 (age 77) Seal Beach, California, U.S.
- Party: Republican
- Profession: Real estate investor, politician

Phillip Ackley Stanton (February 4, 1868 – September 1945) was a Republican politician from California who served in the California State Assembly from 1903 to 1910, serving as Speaker between 1909 and 1910. Stanton is also known for founding the cities of Huntington Beach and Seal Beach. The city of Stanton, California is named in his honor.

== Life ==
Stanton was born in Cleveland, Ohio in 1868, and moved to California in 1887, where he entered a career in real estate, becoming the president of multiple real estate companies. He founded the cities of Huntington Beach (originally known as Pacific City) in 1901 and Seal Beach (originally known as Bay City) in 1915, both in Orange County.

Stanton was first elected to the California State Assembly's 71st district in 1902, receiving a majority of 1,566 votes. He would be re-elected again in 1904, 1906, and 1908. Between 1909 and 1910, Stanton served as the Speaker of the Assembly. In 1910, Stanton attempted to run for Governor of California but lost the Republican primary to progressive candidate Hiram Johnson, who would win the election. He was then a member of the Republican National Committee for California from 1912 to 1916.

Stanton died in September 1945 in the city of Seal Beach, California, which he founded.

The town of Stanton, California is named in his honor after he influenced in its 1911 incorporation as a city.

Preceded by Robert L. Beardslee Sr.	Speaker of the California State Assembly; January 1909 – October 1910	Succeeded by Arthur Hathaway Hewitt
