= Thomas J. White (California politician) =

American politician

1st Speaker of the California State Assembly
- In office December 15, 1849 – February 9, 1850
- Preceded by: Position established
- Succeeded by: John Bigler

Member of the California State Assembly from the Sacramento district
- In office December 15, 1849 – February 9, 1850

Personal details
- Born: Thomas Jefferson White; April 1804 Kentucky, U.S.
- Died: December 17, 1861 (age 57) Los Angeles, California, U.S.
- Party: Democratic, Know Nothing
- Spouse: Frances Jane Perry
- Education: University of Virginia

Thomas Jefferson White (April 1804 – December 17, 1861) was a Democratic politician who served as the first Speaker of the California State Assembly.

== Life ==
White was born in Kentucky in 1804. He attended the University of Virginia studying medicine, law, and chemistry, graduating in 1828. He also lived in Florida and served as an Esquire on the General Staff of the 1st Regiment of the Florida Militia. He later moved to St. Louis and began practicing medicine, also serving as president of the St. Louis Democratic Party in 1840 and president of the St. Louis Lyceum in 1847.

In 1849, he moved to Sacramento in California, and was elected to the California State Assembly in 1849 for its first session, and was elected Speaker of the Assembly, serving until February 1850. In 1852 he moved from Sacramento to San Francisco and was active in the Know Nothing Party, but did not win elected office.

He later moved to Los Angeles and established another medical practice, and served on the Los Angeles Board of Education, until his death in December 1861.

Preceded by Position established	Speaker of the California State Assembly; December 1849–February 1850	Succeeded by John Bigler
