= Hugh McElroy LaRue =

California pioneer

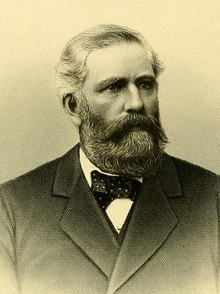

25th Speaker of the California State Assembly
- In office January 1883 – May 1884
- Preceded by: William H. Parks
- Succeeded by: William H. Parks

Member of the California State Assembly from the 18th district
- In office January 3, 1883 – January 5, 1885
- Preceded by: Multi-member district
- Succeeded by: Winfield J. Davis (Note: Multi-member districts abolished)

Delegate to the Second Constitutional Convention of California
- In office September 28, 1878 – March 3, 1879
- Preceded by: Office established
- Succeeded by: Office abolished
- Constituency: 2nd congressional district

12th Sheriff of Sacramento County
- In office 1873–1875
- Preceded by: Mike Bryte
- Succeeded by: Moses M. Drew

Personal details
- Born: Hugh McElroy LaRue; August 12, 1830 Elizabethtown, Kentucky, U.S.
- Died: December 6, 1906 (age 76) Davis, California, U.S.
- Party: Democratic
- Occupation: Sheriff, rancher, farmer, railroad commissioner, politician
- Known for: Pioneer of Sacramento, California

Hugh McElroy LaRue (1830–1906), a member of the LaRue family of Kentucky, US was a California pioneer.

== Biography ==
Hugh was born on August 12, 1830, in Elizabethtown, Kentucky, to Sarah Cummings and Jacob Hodgen LaRue. When he was about nine-years-old, Hugh's family headed west to settle in Lewis County, Missouri, which was still mostly wilderness and inhabited by hostile natives. Not long after, Hugh began dreaming of settling his own family in California. So in the Spring of 1849, before news of the California Gold Rush had made it to Lewis County, Hugh joined an expedition going west, across the Great Plains, by way of the Oregon Trail.

The expedition was led by one V. A. Sublette and his partner, Dr. Conduitt. After gathering provisions for the journey, Hugh and the others crossed the Missouri River in Boonville and started out from Independence on April 29, 1849. The route they followed took them along the Platte River and through South Pass, thence via Sublette's cut-off and the Oregon Trail. Near the end of the journey, they found themselves on the banks of the Truckee River, which proved to be a tremendous obstacle. Because of the rough country surrounding the river, the expedition had to cross it twenty-seven times within thirty miles. The journey finally came to an end on August 12, 1849, when the expedition arrived at the Bear River Mines, in Steep Hollow, California.

Hugh spent the next several years working in the mines, on various ranches, and delivering groceries to the settlers of Shasta. He managed a small restaurant for a short time, and worked as a blacksmith in Sacramento, before a cholera epidemic persuaded him to move out of the city. Hugh then went into the agriculture business and started raising crops of all kinds. His orchards were the most successful, allowing him to expand into the horse and cattle ranching business. Over time, Hugh acquired hundreds of acres of land in Sacramento and in Yolo County. He built a town house in Sacramento, but preferred to stay out on his ranch. He married Elizaberth M. Lizenby of Kentucky in 1858 and had five children with her, four boys and one girl.

According to the author J. M. Guinn, Hugh was active in politics and "staunchly Democratic". He ran for sheriff of Sacramento County in 1857 and won by just eight votes, but he lost the office because of a problem in the courts. Years later, in 1873, Hugh was again elected sheriff and served for the next couple of years. Hugh was involved in a few murder cases during his tenure as sheriff, and was responsible for hanging some of the murderers. After that he went on to become a member of the California State Assembly, also serving as its Speaker and was the president of State Agricultural Society. He later ran for state senator in 1888, but was defeated. A few years later he was elected railroad commissioner from Northern California and served as the president of the board for four years. Hugh was also a member of the local Masonic Lodge and the Sacramento Society of California Pioneers, in which he served as president for a few years shortly before his death in 1906.

In 1898, LaRue ran for governor as a Democrat. He was known for his work in the state's Railroad Commission, where he advocated against the monopoly held by the Southern Pacific Railroad.

Hugh is buried in the Masonic Lawn Cemetery in Sacramento.

== See also ==
- LaRue family

Political offices
Preceded by William H. Parks	Speaker of the California State Assembly; 1883–1884	Succeeded by William H. Parks
Police appointments
Preceded by Mike Bryte	Sheriff of Sacramento County, California; 1873–1875	Succeeded by M.M. Drew
