= Arthur Hathaway Hewitt =

American politician, lawyer, clerk, teacher, and undersheriff

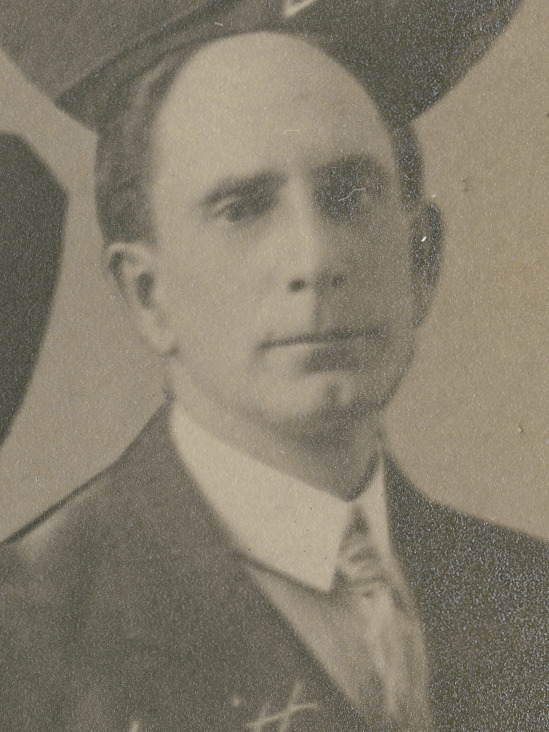
- Hewitt c. 1907

38th Speaker of the California State Assembly
- In office January 2, 1911 – December 24, 1911
- Preceded by: Philip A. Stanton
- Succeeded by: C. C. Young

Member of the California State Assembly from the 8th district
- In office January 7, 1907 – December 24, 1911
- Preceded by: E. T. Manwell
- Succeeded by: Joseph Alfred Murray

Personal details
- Born: Arthur Hathaway Hewitt; May 10, 1858 Pomfret, Vermont, US
- Died: September 3, 1929 (aged 71) San Francisco, California, US
- Party: Republican
- Spouse: Mariette Meteer
- Children: 4

Arthur Hathaway Hewitt (May 10, 1858 – September 3, 1929) was an American politician, lawyer, clerk, teacher, and undersheriff who served as the Speaker of the California State Assembly from January to December 1911.

== Biography ==
Hewitt was born in Pomfret, Vermont, on May 10, 1858, to Lucien and Lucy Marie Hewitt, and had a sister named Mary. He attended the Randolph State Normal School, a public school meant to train teachers, paying his own tuition until he graduated at the age of eighteen. Hewitt moved to California in 1878, teaching in Live Oak, Nicolaus, and Yuba City. He became principal at the school in Yuba City, and served on the Sutter County Board of Education for seventeen years. After he retired from teaching, Hewitt served two years as undersheriff. In 1880, Hewitt was elected to the county offices of clerk, auditor, and recorder, which were all the same position at the time. Hewitt was the first clerk in the county to be a member of the Republican Party. He retired from that position after six years, studying law and becoming a member of the State Bar of California in 1893. Hewitt was a successful lawyer, considered to be well-read.

In 1903, Hewitt assisted in searching for three escaped convicts from Folsom State Prison. A newspaper at the time quipped that Hewitt, whose middle name was Hathaway, "'hath-a-way' of striking terror into the hearts of all who dare oppose him".

Hewitt served in the California State Assembly, taking office on January 7, 1907, as an assemblyman from Sutter County. Hewitt was unanimously elected Speaker of the California State Assembly on January 2, 1911, and his last day in session in the Assembly was on December 24 of the same year.

Hewitt was married to Mariette Metteer, with whom he had four children. He died of a heart condition on September 3, 1929, after his health had declined on the way to San Francisco. The Yuba County Superior Court adjourned to mourn his death, and resolved to "draw up resolutions on his memory". The Sutter County Farmer praised Hewitt's judgement, activism, and generosity in their obituary; writing that Hewitt was "a man whose counsel and advice was always in demand and given the highest consideration, and one who was always ready to assist in any kind of public progressive movement, and was charitable and kind at all times".
