= Ralph M. Brown =

American politician

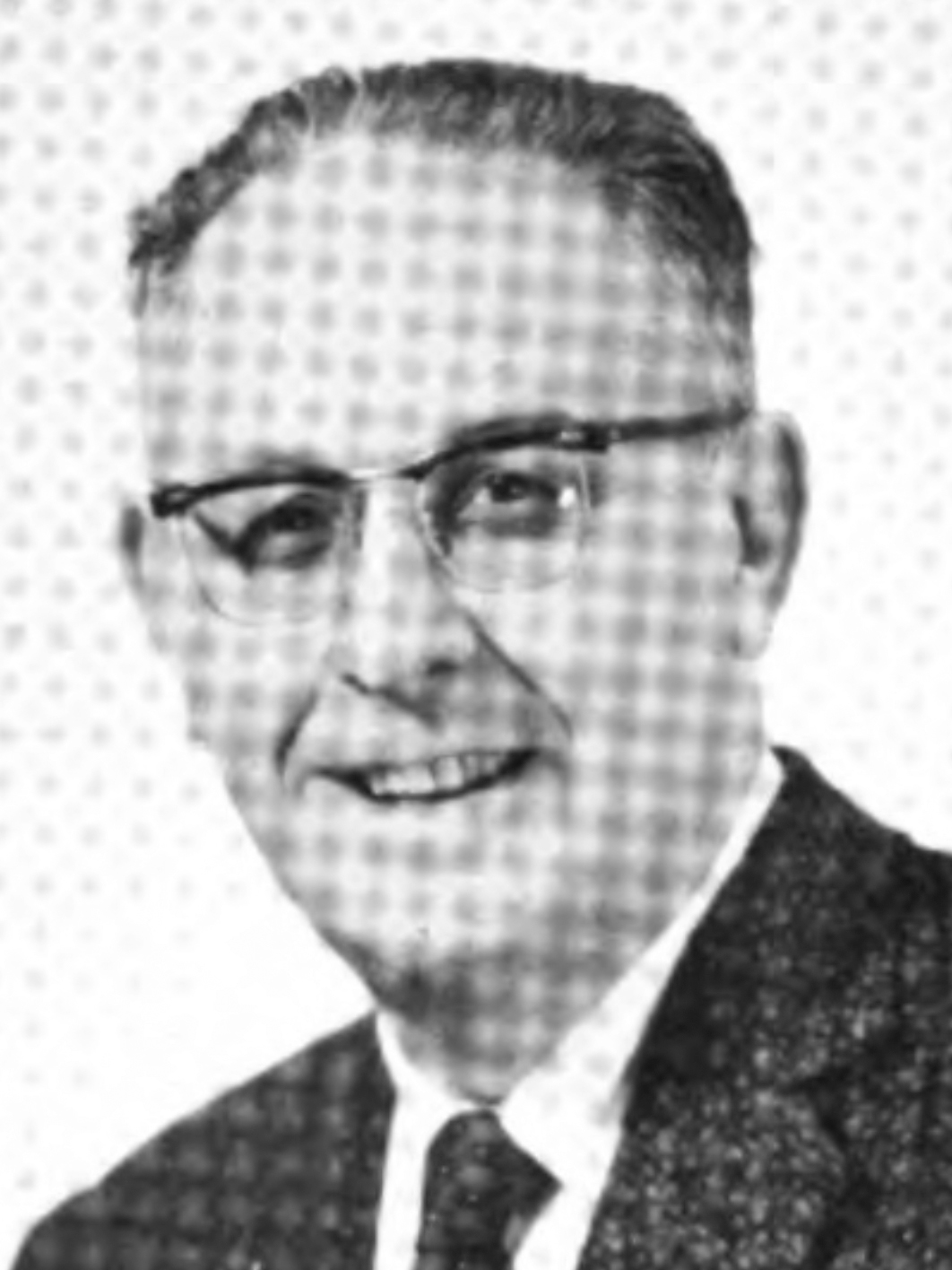
- Official portrait, 1953

53rd Speaker of the California State Assembly
- In office January 5, 1959 – September 19, 1961
- Preceded by: Luther H. Lincoln
- Succeeded by: Jesse M. Unruh

Member of the California State Assembly from the 30th district
- In office January 4, 1943 – September 19, 1961
- Preceded by: Byrl Salsman
- Succeeded by: John Veneman

Personal details
- Born: Ralph Milton Brown; September 16, 1908 Somerset, Kentucky
- Died: April 9, 1966 (aged 57) California
- Party: Democratic
- Spouse: Lillian G. Weber
- Children: 1

Ralph Milton Brown (September 16, 1908 – April 9, 1966) was a member of the California State Assembly representing the 30th State Assembly district from 1943 to 1961. Born in Somerset, Kentucky and a resident of Modesto, California, he was Speaker of the Assembly from January 1959 until he resigned in September 1961 to accept appointment to the California Courts of Appeal, Fifth Appellate District Court. He is best known for writing the Brown Act, California's first sunshine law, providing for increased public access to government meetings, which was enacted in 1953.

California Assembly
Preceded by Burl R. Salsman	California State Assemblyman, 30th District; 1943-1961	Succeeded by John Veneman
Political offices
Preceded by Luther H. Lincoln	Speaker of the California State Assembly; January 1959–September 1961	Succeeded by Jesse M. Unruh
