= Luther H. Lincoln =

American politician (1914–1980)

Luther Hansen Lincoln
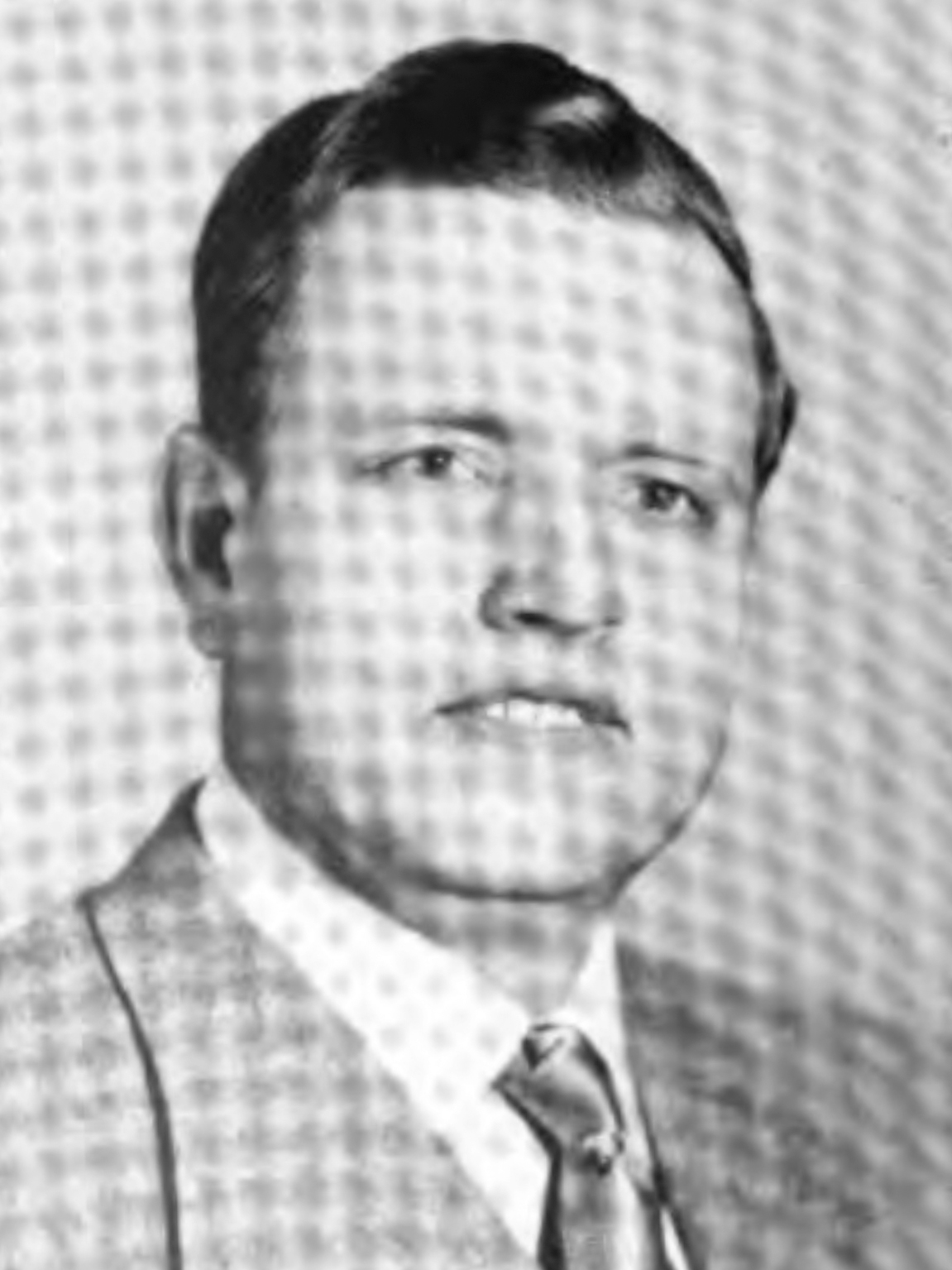

52nd Speaker of the California State Assembly
- In office January 3, 1955 – April 18, 1958
- Preceded by: James W. Silliman
- Succeeded by: Ralph M. Brown

Member of the California State Assembly from the 15th district
- In office January 3, 1949 – January 5, 1959
- Preceded by: Bernard A. Sheridan
- Succeeded by: Nicholas C. Petris

Personal details
- Born: Luther Hansen Lincoln; November 20, 1914 McCabe, Montana, U.S.
- Died: June 27, 1980 (aged 65) Walnut Creek, California, U.S.
- Party: Republican
- Spouse: Helen Margaret Pedersen (M. 1935)
- Children: 4

Luther Hansen Lincoln (November 20, 1914 – June 27, 1980) was a Republican politician from California who served in the California State Assembly from January 3, 1949, to January 5, 1959, representing part of Alameda County. He served as Speaker of the Assembly from 1955 to 1958.

California Assembly
Preceded by Bernard A. Sheridan	California State Assemblyman, 15th District; 1949–1959	Succeeded by Nicholas C. Petris
Political offices
Preceded by James W. Silliman	Speaker of the California State Assembly; January 1955–April 1958	Succeeded by Ralph M. Brown
