= Robert Beardslee =

American politician (1868–1926)

Robert L. Beardslee Sr.
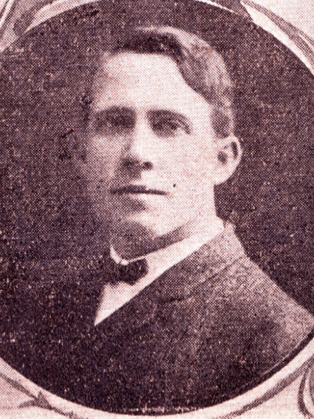

36th Speaker of the California State Assembly
- In office January 7, 1907 – November 23, 1907
- Preceded by: Frank C. Prescott
- Succeeded by: Phillip A. Stanton

Member of the California State Assembly from the 23rd district
- In office January 2, 1905 – January 2, 1911
- Preceded by: Frank E. Dunlap
- Succeeded by: Elmer H. McGowen

Personal details
- Born: July 12, 1868 San Joaquin County, California
- Died: March 15, 1926 (aged 57)
- Party: Republican
- Children: 1
- Profession: Attorney

Robert Lewis Beardslee Sr. (July 12, 1868 – March 15, 1926) was a Republican city attorney of Stockton, California and state legislator who served as the 36th Speaker of the California State Assembly in the early 1900s.

== Biography ==
Robert Beardslee was born in 1868 in San Joaquin County, a rural California county east of the San Francisco Bay Area. He attended public schools and graduated from San Joaquin Valley College. He was admitted to practice law and then served as the City Attorney of Stockton, California in 1905 and 1906.

On November 8, 1904, he was elected to represent the 23rd Assembly District, which encompassed the City of Stockton (now renumbered the 17th Assembly District). (Note: See California Assembly for listing of Assembly Districts and current legislative representative.) Beardslee served in the Assembly until 1911, including service as Speaker of the Assembly during the 1907 session.

His son, Robert L. Beardslee, Jr. (August 3, 1905 – March 3, 1999), was also a lawyer, and was a partner in Neumiller & Beardslee with Charlie Neumiller.

== Notes ==
Preceded by Frank C. Prescott	Speaker of the California State Assembly; January 1907 – November 1908	Succeeded by Philip A. Stanton

Political offices
Preceded by Frank E. Dunlap	California State Assemblyman, 23rd District; 1905 – 1911	Succeeded by E. H. McGowen
