= John Veneman =

American politician (1925–1982)

Member of the California State Assembly from the 30th district
- In office January 30, 1962 – March 6, 1969
- Preceded by: Ralph M. Brown
- Succeeded by: Clare Berryhill

Personal details
- Born: October 31, 1925 Corcoran, California, U.S.
- Died: April 11, 1982 (aged 56) Sacramento, California, U.S.
- Party: Republican
- Spouse: Nita Bomberger (m. 1947)
- Children: Ann Veneman and 2 others
- Education: University of Texas at Austin

John G. Veneman (October 31, 1925 – April 11, 1982) was a Republican politician from Modesto, California. He was born in Corcoran and died in Sacramento. He was elected to the California State Assembly for the 30th District five times in succession, between 1962 and 1969. In 1969 he resigned to become Under Secretary at the United States Department of Health, Education, and Welfare under Secretary of HEW Robert Finch. In 1974 he was unsuccessful in a bid to become Lieutenant Governor of California.

He was the father of Ann Veneman, United States Secretary of Agriculture 2001–2005. The portion of State Route 99 from the Stanislaus County line to State Route 132 in Modesto is named the "John G. Veneman Freeway". It was named by Assembly Concurrent Resolution No. 171, Chapter 131, in 1984.
