= Jabez F. Cowdery =

American politician

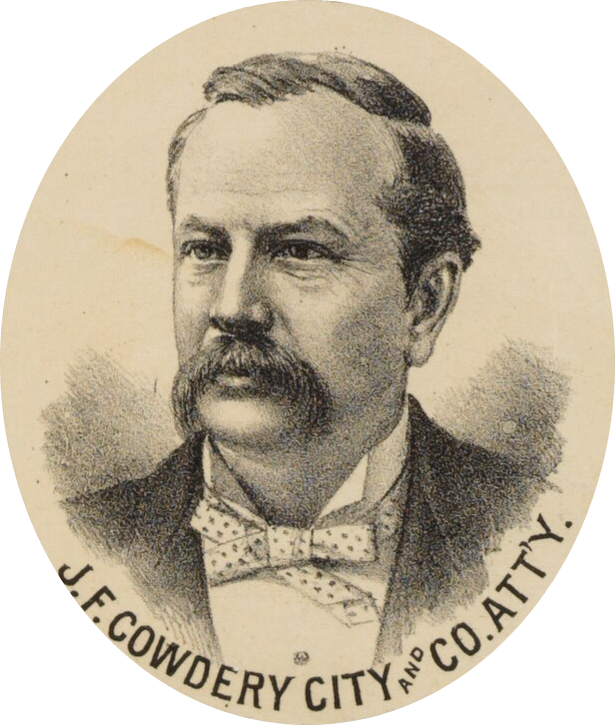
- Cowdery c. 1881

23rd Speaker of the California State Assembly
- In office January 5, 1880 – January 3, 1881
- Preceded by: Campbell Polson Berry
- Succeeded by: William H. Parks

Member of the California State Assembly
- In office January 5, 1880 – January 3, 1881
- Constituency: 13th district
- In office December 1, 1873 – December 6, 1875
- Constituency: 8th district

City Attorney of San Francisco
- In office 1882–1883
- Preceded by: John Luttrell Murphy
- Succeeded by: William Craig

Personal details
- Born: Jabez Franklin Cowdery; August 11, 1834 Rochester, New York, U.S.
- Died: October 9, 1914 (aged 80)
- Party: Democratic (before 1873); People's Independent (1873–1875); Republican (after 1875)

Jabez Franklin Cowdery (11 August 1834 – 9 October 1914) was an American lawyer and politician who represented San Francisco in the 1873–74 and 1880 sessions of the California State Assembly, serving as Speaker in 1880.

== Early life ==
A 1911 book by Mary Bryant Alverson Mehling gives a picaresque account of Cowdery's early life. According to Mehling, Cowdery was born in Rochester, New York, the sixth and youngest child of Benjamin Franklin Cowdery (1790–1867), a Massachusetts printer, and his first wife, Amanda Munger (1799–1842) of Vermont. Benjamin Franklin, or Frank, was a second cousin of Oliver Cowdery, one of the Book of Mormon witnesses. After Jabez' mother's death, his father placed him in a Rochester orphanage. When he was 10 the orphanage indentured him until the age of 21 at a nearby seed garden, but after two years he ran away, travelling by barge and steamboat to New York City, where he became a sailor on oceangoing merchant vessels. In 1850 he came ashore at Sacramento. He briefly joined the Booth family as a supernumerary on their 1852 theatre tour of California, before running away to Downieville to join the California gold rush. He studied at the private library of a man named Langton and qualified as a lawyer in 1859.

== Political and legal career ==
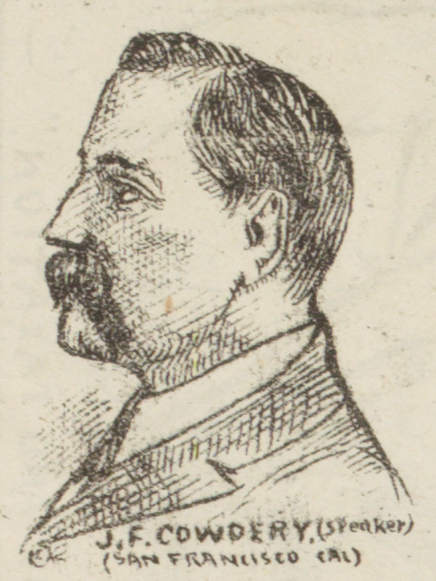
Sketch by Carl Browne, 1880

At an Alleghany, California meeting after the rival 1860 Democratic National Conventions, Cowdery spoke in favour of Stephen A. Douglas against John C. Breckinridge. At this time he went by "Frank", from his middle name. Cowdery was appointed city attorney of Downieville in May 1863, served as district attorney of Sierra County from 1863 to 1866, and was also a school director. In the Civil War he worked for the Internal Revenue Service and as a court commissioner in California's then 14th district (covering Placer and Nevada counties). After the war, he moved to San Francisco as an attorney in private practice. In 1870 Henry Huntly Haight, the Governor of California, appointed Cowdery one of three commissioners of the Marine Board of the Port of San Francisco, newly established to prevent shanghaiing; it was rendered redundant by the federal Shipping Commissioners Act of 1872 and abolished in 1875.

Cowdery was elected to the 1873–74 session of the California State Assembly on the slate of the People's Union, one of a succession of parties briefly dominant in San Francisco, which in 1873 returned 11 of the 12 seats allocated to the city by plurality block voting. He unsuccessfully proposed to end the mandate for segregated schools for Black children, on the grounds that separate but equal schools were not being provided.

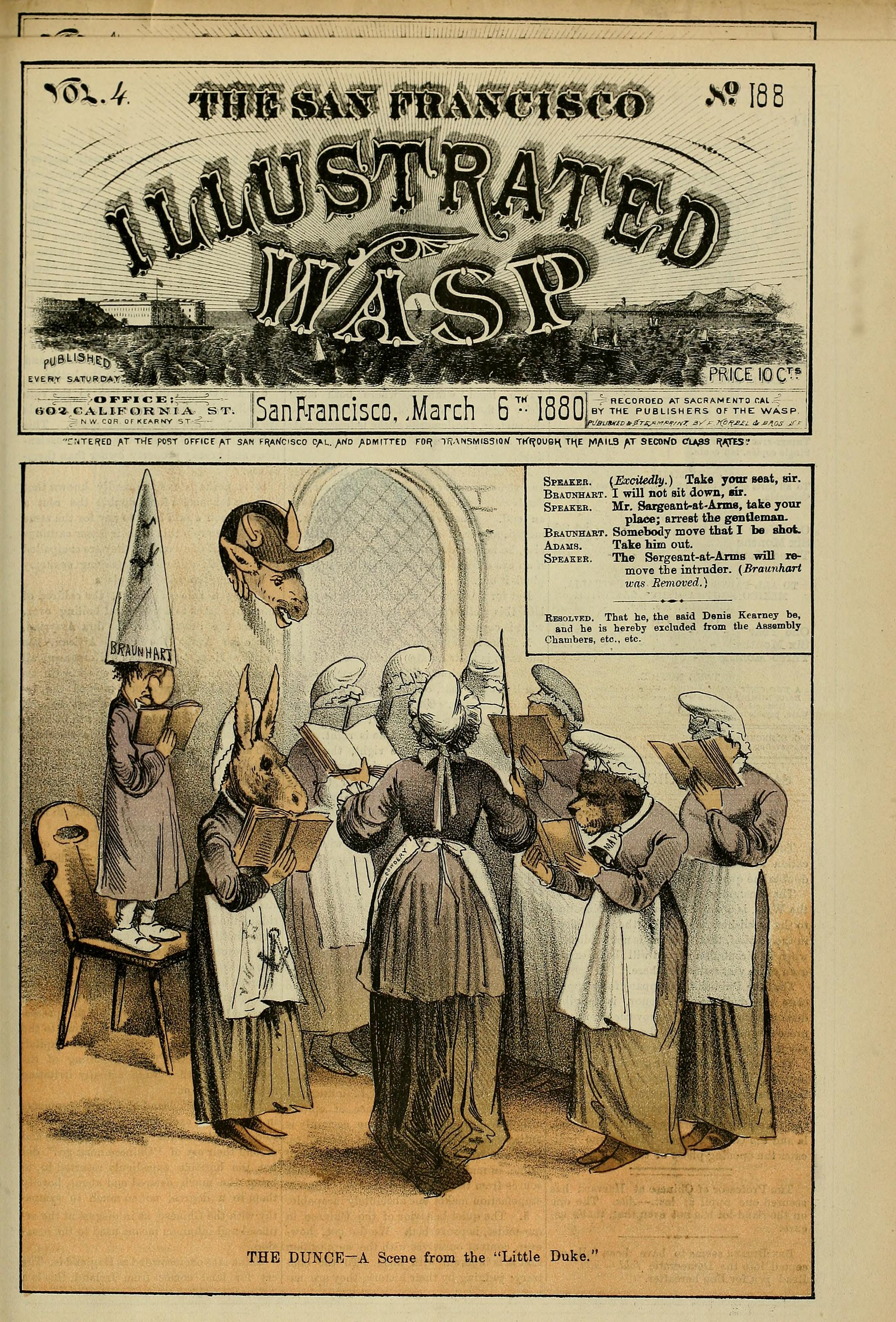
"THE DUNCE—A Scene from the 'Little Duke,'" a political cartoon published in The Wasp depicting Cowdery disciplining Workingmen's Party Assemblyman Samuel Braunhart, March 6, 1880

At the 1879 Assembly election, Cowdery was one of two Republicans returned, alongside two from the Workingmen's Party, (Note: A. B. Maguire and Stephen Maybell) for the four-member 13th Assembly district, comprising parts of San Francisco's 11th and 12th wards. He served as Speaker for the Assembly's ensuing 1880 session, outlining an agenda of reducing public salaries, lowering tax rates by reducing tax avoidance, and updating the legal code following the 1879 Constitutional Convention. As Speaker he was ex officio a regent of the University of California from 1880 to 1881.

Cowdery was elected in 1881 to a two-year term as City Attorney of San Francisco, defeating H. T. Hammond by 16,514 votes to 16,219. In relation to two court appeals by the city which were pending at the expiry of his term, Cowdery was later paid $100 by the attorney for the opposing side not to offer further legal advice to the city. In 1886, the Supreme Court of California ruled this was professional misconduct and suspended him for six months.

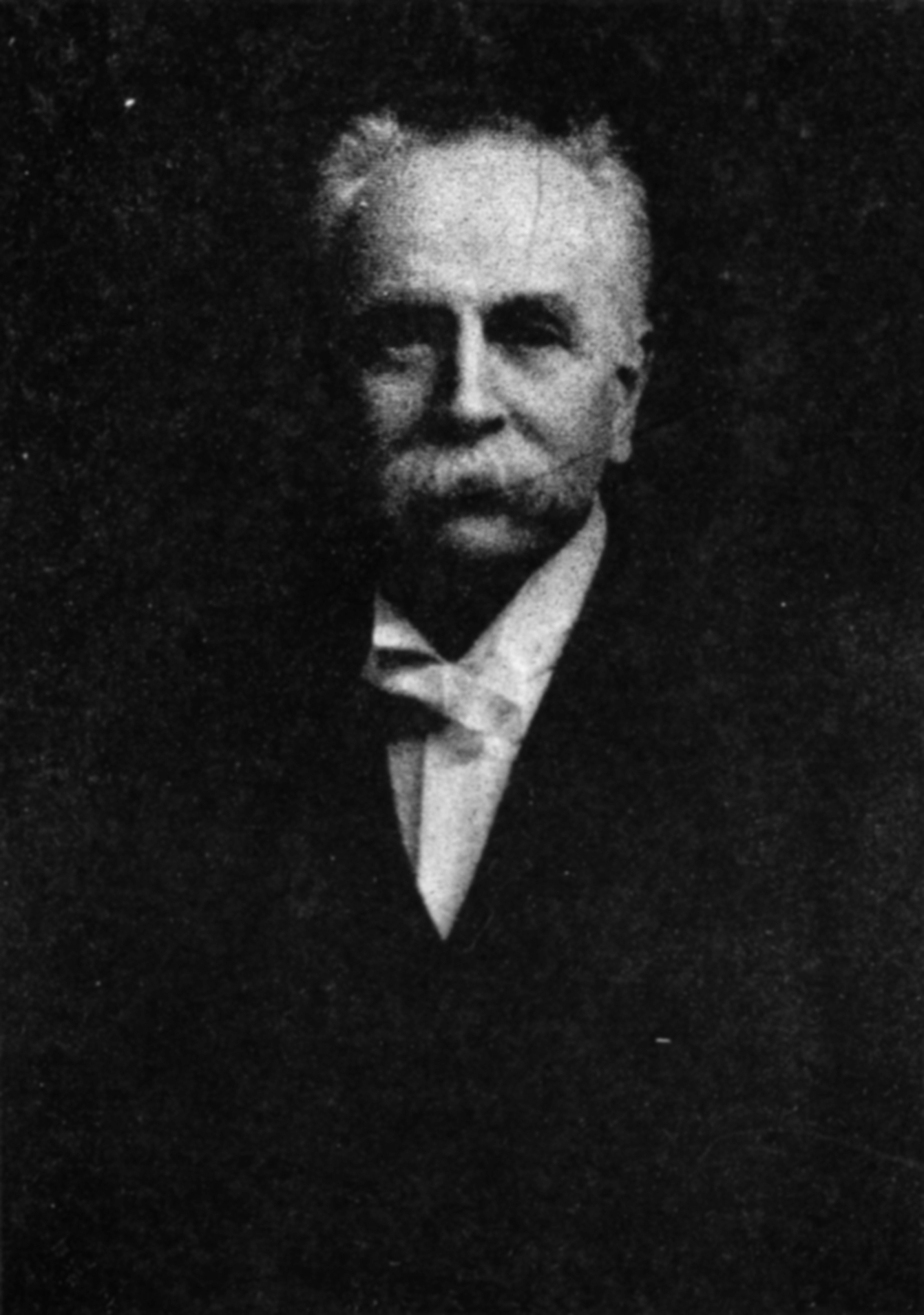
Cowdery c. 1911

Cowdery wrote and revised several legal manuals. His law library was damaged in the 1906 San Francisco earthquake, after which he was on the commission to rebuild San Francisco City Hall.

== Family ==
Cowdery married twice: in 1862 to Mary Buerer of Canton, Ohio (1840–1877) and in 1878 to Lulu M. Chesley. He had two daughters with each wife; the first two died young. The second two were Alice May Cowdery, who wrote for newspapers and magazines, and Ina Louisa Cowdery, a musician, both photographed by Arnold Genthe as society beauties. Alice's 1915 account of a cruise from San Francisco to the Panama Canal ends with the Chagres River reminding her of her father: "a little boy of ten, unhappy, rebellious baby, who ran away from his New York home, and wandered to this same gray-green jungle spot".

== Sources ==
- Fariss; Smith (1882). Illustrated history of Plumas, Lassen & Sierra counties, with California from 1513 to 1850. San Francisco: Fariss & Smith.
- Mehling, Mary Bryant Alverson (1911). Cowdrey-Cowdery-Cowdray genealogy : William Cowdrey of Lynn, Massachusetts, 1630, and his descendants. New York: Frank Allaben Genealogical Co.
- 20th session: 1st December 1873 to 30th March 1874. The Journal of the Assembly of the Legislature of the State of California. Sacramento: G. H. Springer, State Printer. 1874.
- 23rd session: January 5th to April 18th, 1880. The Journal of the Assembly of the Legislature of the State of California. Sacramento: J. D. Young, Superintendent of State Printing. 1880.

Preceded by Campbell Polson Berry	Speaker of the California State Assembly; January 1880–April 1880	Succeeded by William H. Parks
