= Edgar C. Levey =

American politician

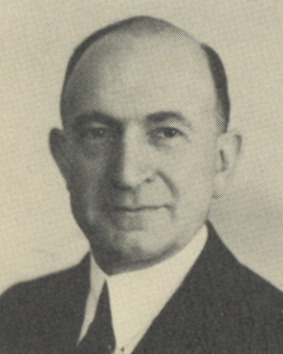

42nd Speaker of the California State Assembly
- In office January 1927 – December 1932
- Preceded by: Frank F. Merriam
- Succeeded by: Walter J. Little

Member of the California State Assembly from the 28th district
- In office January 4, 1937 – January 2, 1939
- Preceded by: James F. Brennan
- Succeeded by: Robert Miller Green
- In office January 5, 1925 – January 7, 1935
- Preceded by: Louis F. Erb
- Succeeded by: James F. Brennan

Personal details
- Born: Edgar C. Levey; August 4, 1881 San Francisco, California
- Died: October 8, 1962 (aged 81) San Francisco, California
- Party: Republican
- Spouse: Emily Newman (m. 1916)
- Children: 3
- Profession: Attorney

Edgar C. Levey (August 4, 1881 – October 8, 1962) was an American politician and attorney. He was Speaker of the California State Assembly and an assistant District Attorney in San Francisco in the early 1900s.

== Early life ==
Levey was born in 1881 in San Francisco, California. He graduated from Lowell High School. He received his Bachelor's degree from the University of California, in 1903. He got his law degree from Hastings College of Law in 1905.

== Career ==
In 1906, he was appointed Assistant District Attorney for San Francisco under D.A. Hiram Johnson. Levey left the D.A.'s office in 1910 to go into private practice.

In November 1924, he was first elected to the California State Assembly to represent San Francisco's 28th Assembly District. In the legislature, Levey chaired a committee to investigate the need for motor laws and mandatory automobile liability insurance. Levey was re-elected to his assembly seat in 1926, 1928, 1930, and 1932. Levey was elected the 42nd Speaker of the California State Assembly in 1927. He served three terms as Speaker. Levey was succeeded by Walter J. Little as Speaker in January 1933.

In 1934, Levey ran for the United States Congress, but lost the Republican primary for Congressional District 4. In November 1936, Levey returned to the California State Assembly for one term. In 1938, he ran for Senate District 14 and lost. He tried to reclaim his old Assembly seat in the reapportioned 19th Assembly District in 1944 but lost.

== Personal life ==
Levey married Emily Newman in 1916 and raised two children: Janet Therese and Elaine Alice.

He was president of the Native Sons of the Golden West and was a Master of Masons. He served 1917 to 1918 as Great Sachem (state president) of the Great Council of California, Improved Order of Red Men. He had been initiated into Oshonee Tribe No. 78 of San Francisco on March 31, 1909; served as Sachem (local president) in the first half of 1911. He served as the Great Incohonee (national president) of the Order 1938-1940 and presided in the latter year at Columbus, Ohio. Upon the completion of his service on the national board he was appointed to the Great Board of Appeals (national judicial body) on which he served until his death in 1962.

Levey died on October 8, 1962, at Hahnemann Hospital in San Francisco.

California Assembly
Preceded by Louis F. Erb	California State Assemblyman, 28th District; January 5, 1925 - January 7, 1935	Succeeded by James F. Brennan
Preceded by James F. Brennan	California State Assemblyman, 28th District; January 4, 1937 - January 2, 1939	Succeeded by Robert Miller Green
Political offices
Preceded by Frank F. Merriam	Speaker of the California State Assembly; January 1927–January 1933	Succeeded by Walter J. Little
