= Howard E. Wright =

American politician

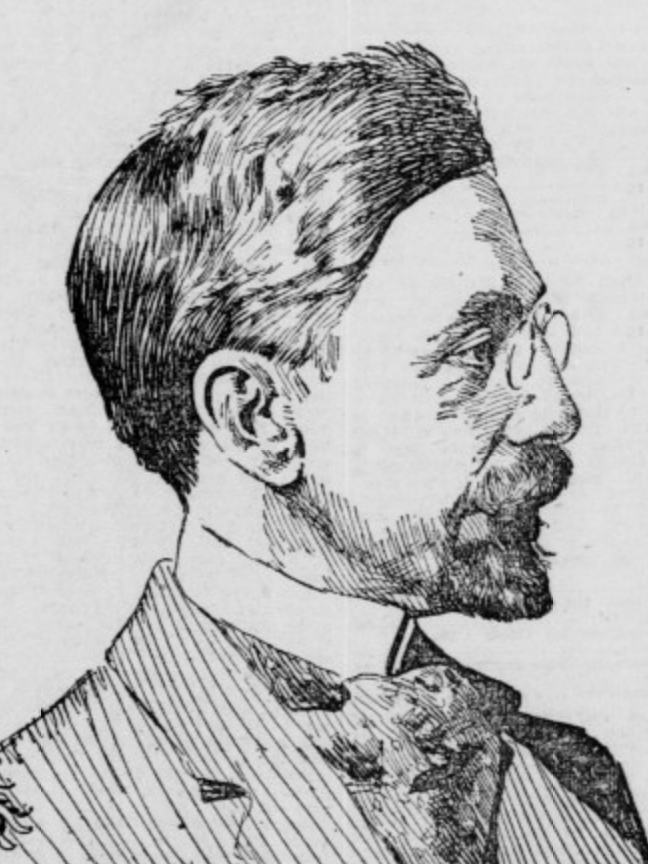

31st Speaker of the California State Assembly
- In office January 1899
- Preceded by: Frank Leslie Coombs
- Succeeded by: Alden Anderson

Member of the California State Assembly from the 51st district
- In office January 4, 1897 – January 1, 1901
- Preceded by: Clinton Griswold Dodge
- Succeeded by: Newell K. Foster

Personal details
- Born: October 20, 1866 Carson City, Nevada, U.S.
- Died: October 10, 1942 (age 76) Berkeley, California, U.S.
- Party: Republican
- Spouse: Jean Wellman (m. 1893)

Howard Elwood Wright (October 20, 1866 – October 10, 1942) was an American politician who served in the California State Assembly as a Republican.

== Biography ==
Wright was born on October 20, 1866 in Carson City, Nevada, the son of a judge, Samuel Huntington Wright. His professional career was in the oil and insurance industry.

=== Political career ===
Wright was elected to the California State Assembly in 1896 as a Republican, representing the 51st district. In January 1899, Wright was elected the 31st Speaker of the Assembly, but resigned the office after just 29 days after he was allegedly involved in a vote-buying scheme for U.S. Senate candidates, which at the time were elected by the state legislature. Alden Anderson was chosen to succeed Wright as Speaker following his resignation. Wright had also forged campaign documents, the penalty for which would have been forfeiture of office; James K. Burnett, another state assemblyman, introduced an expulsion resolution for Wright prior to his resignation from the Assembly in 1901.

=== Later life ===
Wright died at his home in Berkeley, California on October 10, 1942 at the age of 76.

Preceded by Frank Leslie Coombs	Speaker of the California State Assembly; January 1899	Succeeded by Alden Anderson
