= Hugh R. Pomeroy =

American politician

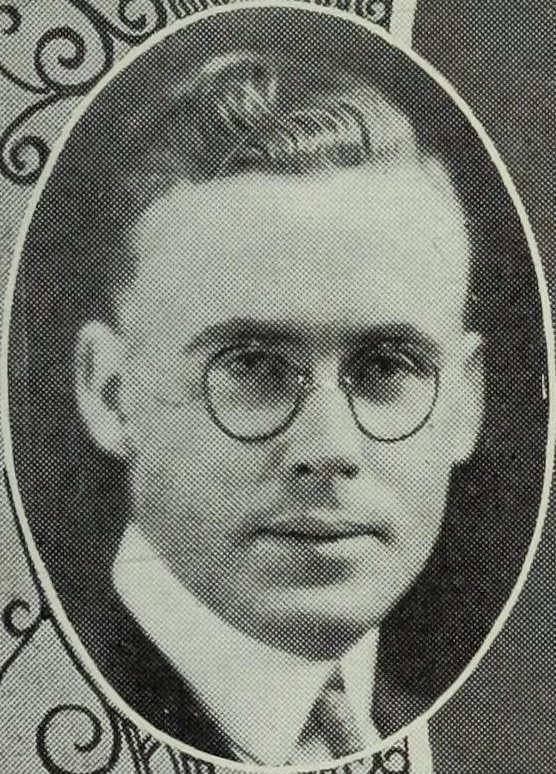
- Pomeroy c. 1924

Member of the California State Assembly from the 62nd district
- In office January 8, 1923 - January 5, 1925
- Preceded by: Arthur A. Weber
- Succeeded by: Walter J. Little

Personal details
- Born: May 29, 1899 Burbank, California, U.S.
- Died: July 1, 1961 (aged 62) Tarrytown, New York, U.S.
- Party: Republican
- Spouse: Jean Ursula Stoll Pomeroy
- Children: 1

Military service
- Branch/service: United States Army
- Battles/wars: World War I

Hugh Reynolds Pomeroy (May 29, 1899 – July 1, 1961) was an American politician who served in the California State Assembly for the 62nd district from 1923 to 1925. At just 23 years old, he was the youngest member of the legislature. He served in the United States Army during World War I.
