= Robert Howe (California politician) =

American union organizer and politician

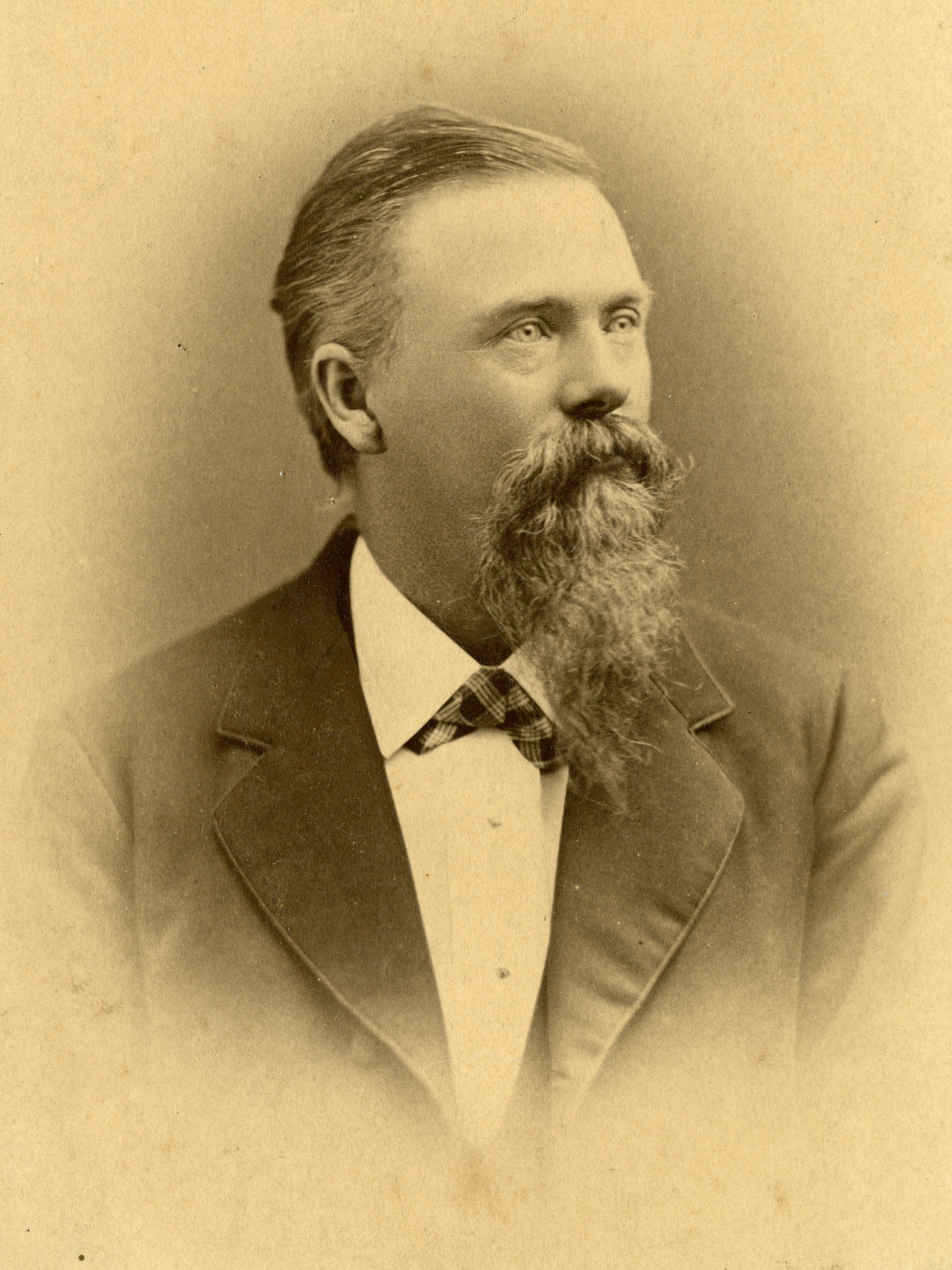
- Howe c. 1869–1881

27th Speaker of the California State Assembly
- In office January 1889 – March 1889
- Preceded by: William H. Jordan
- Succeeded by: Frank Leslie Coombs

Member of the California State Assembly
- In office 1888–1890
- Constituency: 25th district
- In office 1873–1875
- Constituency: 8th district
- In office 1858–1861
- Constituency: 7th district

Member of the California Senate from the 13th district
- In office 1875–1881

Personal details
- Born: October 23, 1831 New York City, New York, U.S.
- Died: October 27, 1915 (aged 84) San Francisco, California, U.S.
- Party: Democratic
- Other political affiliations: Workingmen's (1881)

Robert Howe (October 23, 1831 – October 27, 1915) was a Democratic politician who served in the California State Assembly and California State Senate, also serving as the Speaker of the Assembly in 1889.

== Life ==
Howe was born in New York, the son of Abraham Howe and Elizabeth Littlejohn, but moved to California in 1853 where he worked in gold mines in Tuolumne County before being a commission merchant in San Francisco. He served in the California State Assembly as a Democrat from the 7th district between 1858 and 1861 and later from the 8th district between 1873 and 1875, serving as Speaker pro-tempore of the Assembly. He then served in the California State Senate from the 13th district between 1875 and 1881. In 1881, he unsuccessfully ran for mayor of San Francisco on a Workingmen's-Democratic Fusion ticket. He was also supported by the local Colored Citizens Council. He returned to the Assembly in 1888, this time from the 25th district, and he became Speaker of the Assembly in 1889. He left the Assembly in 1890 and died in 1915.

Preceded by William H. Jordan	Speaker of the California State Assembly; January 1889–March 1889	Succeeded by Frank Leslie Coombs
