= Dockweiler (disambiguation) =

Dockweiler may refer to:

== Geography ==
- Dockweiler, a municipality in Rhineland-Palatinate, western Germany
- Dockweiler State Beach, a beach near Los Angeles, California, USA

== Surname ==
- Dockweiler (surname)
