= Bryte, California =

Bryte
- Location in California
- Coordinates: 38°35′41″N 121°32′30″W
- Country: United States
- State: California
- County: Yolo County
- Elevation: 23 ft (7 m)

Bryte (formerly, Riverbank) is a former town in Yolo County, California, now forming part of West Sacramento.

It is located just south of the Sacramento River in the eastern portion of the county. Bryte's ZIP Code is 95605 and is in area codes 916 and 279. It lies at an elevation of 23 feet (7 m).

== History ==
Prior to its settlement as a town, the land that became Riverbank was used for dairy farming. The second dairy farm in Yolo County was established in 1850 in flood-prone areas west and south of a bend in the Sacramento River, on the opposite side of the river from Sacramento itself. Mike Bryte, who had emigrated from Ohio to California in 1850 seeking fortune in the California Gold Rush, purchased the land in 1853 and established a successful dairy farm, using steamships to transport his product to market. He became a prominent Sacramento citizen, serving as a supervisor for Yolo County and sheriff of Sacramento County. He died in 1887.

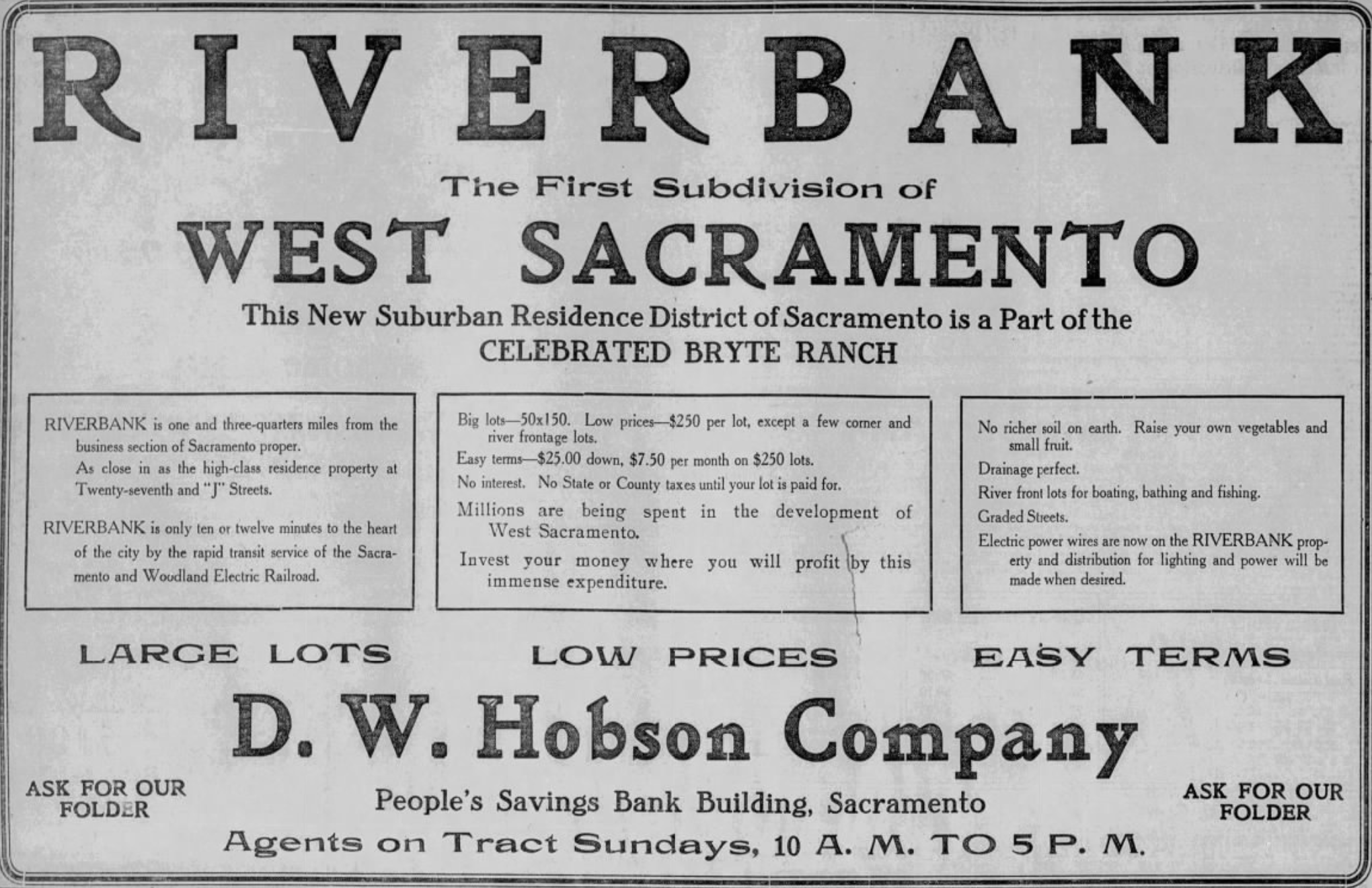
Newspaper advertisement, 1912

In 1910, the Bryte ranch was sold for $150,000 to the West Sacramento Company, a land company that purchased multiple large tracts in the area and announced plans for reclamation and subdivision into farm acreages. The following year, developer D.W. Hobson commenced sales of a residential subdivision, offering plots on a 200-acre section of the former ranch for purchase as home sites in a new town, to be named Riverbank. Advertisements in local papers offered potential buyers free transportation to the area and monthly payments of $7.50 with zero down payment. The area would soon be served by the Sacramento-Woodland Railway, an electrified passenger train between the two towns, and Hobson envisioned Riverbank as a commuter town for men working in Sacramento. Grading of Sacramento Avenue, Hobson Avenue, Lisbon Avenue, Riverbank Road, and Bryte, Yolo, Solano, Water, and Sutter Streets began in January 1912, and the railway had its first scheduled passenger service on the 4th of July. By year's end, the developer had reported the sale of 427 of 565 lots in the subdivision.

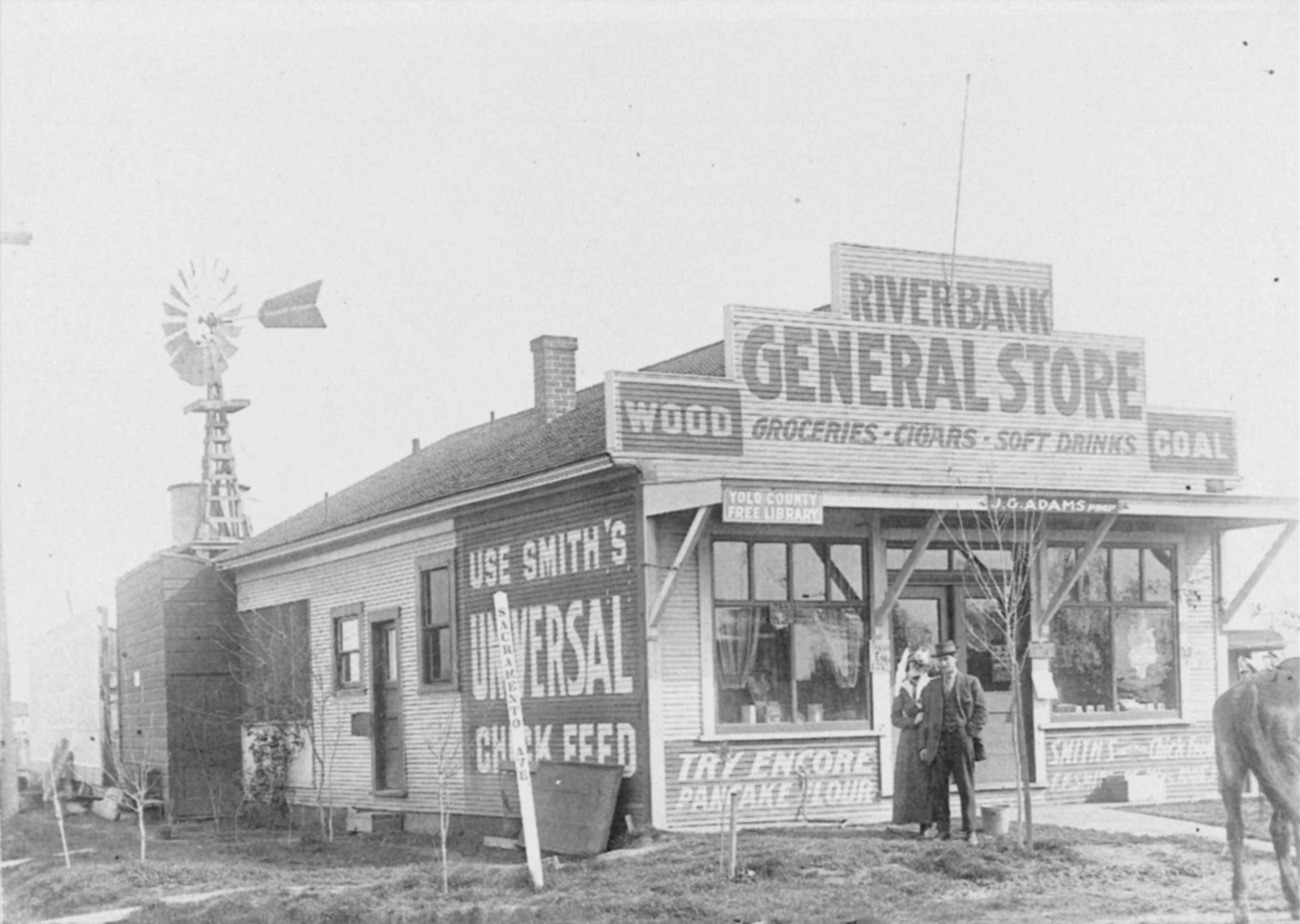
Riverbank general store, 1913

The town's new residents soon established a civic association, the Riverbank Improvement Club, and advocated for improvements such as a school and rural mail delivery route. The Club met in the Riverbank general store, established in May 1913 by M. W. Powell. The store also served as the town library, and the storekeeper's wife the librarian. At the time, Riverbank children, numbering forty in 1913, walked to the school in Broderick, a distance of several miles. The Hobson Co. had in 1912 set aside plots in the subdivision for a school, but a school district was not officially established until January 1914. Following passage of a $10,000 bond measure in May 1914, architect John Woodward Woollett produced plans in a Mission Revival style featuring twin towers, tiled roofs, and cloistered archways. However, this design proved to be over budget, and there was some consternation among residents when the constructed building differed from what they had been led to expect. The school opened on September 7, 1912, with 37 pupils attending.

In September 1914, the Improvement Club determined to petition for a post office, the town's earlier request for a rural route having been denied by the Postal Department on account of poor road conditions. The town agreed to make road improvements as well as change its name to avoid confusion with the town of the same name in Stanislaus County; "Bryte City" was chosen due to the continued prominence of the Bryte family in the area. The post office was granted on March 11, 1915.
