= William H. Jordan (California politician) =

American politician (1849–1939)

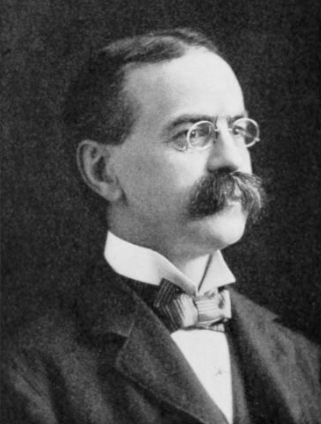
- Jordan in 1889

26th Speaker of the California State Assembly
- In office January 1887 – March 1887
- Preceded by: William H. Parks
- Succeeded by: Robert Howe

Member of the California State Assembly from the 55th district
- In office January 5, 1885 – January 7, 1889
- Preceded by: District established
- Succeeded by: Melvin C. Chapman

Personal details
- Born: September 3, 1849 Cincinnati, Ohio, U.S.
- Died: February 14, 1939 (aged 89) Toledo, Ohio, U.S.
- Party: Republican
- Spouse: Alice Wildes Thompson (m. 1874; died 1876) Mary Floretta Knowlton (m. 1879) Mary Lawrence Treanor (m. 1894)
- Relatives: Frank M. Jordan (nephew)

William Henry Jordan (1849–1939) was a Republican politician from California, who served in the California State Assembly from the 55th district. He later served as Speaker of the Assembly in 1887. He was the uncle of former California Secretary of State Frank M. Jordan.

== Biography ==
William H. Jordan was born in Cincinnati on September 3, 1849.

He married Alice Wildes Thompson in 1874, and they had one daughter. Alice died in 1876, and he remarried to Mary Floretta Knowlton in 1879. They had four children. In 1894 he married Mary Lawrence Treanor, and they had one son.

He died in Toledo, Ohio.

Preceded by William H. Parks	Speaker of the California State Assembly; January 1887 – March 1887	Succeeded by Robert Howe
