= 1902 California lieutenant gubernatorial election =

- November 4, 1902
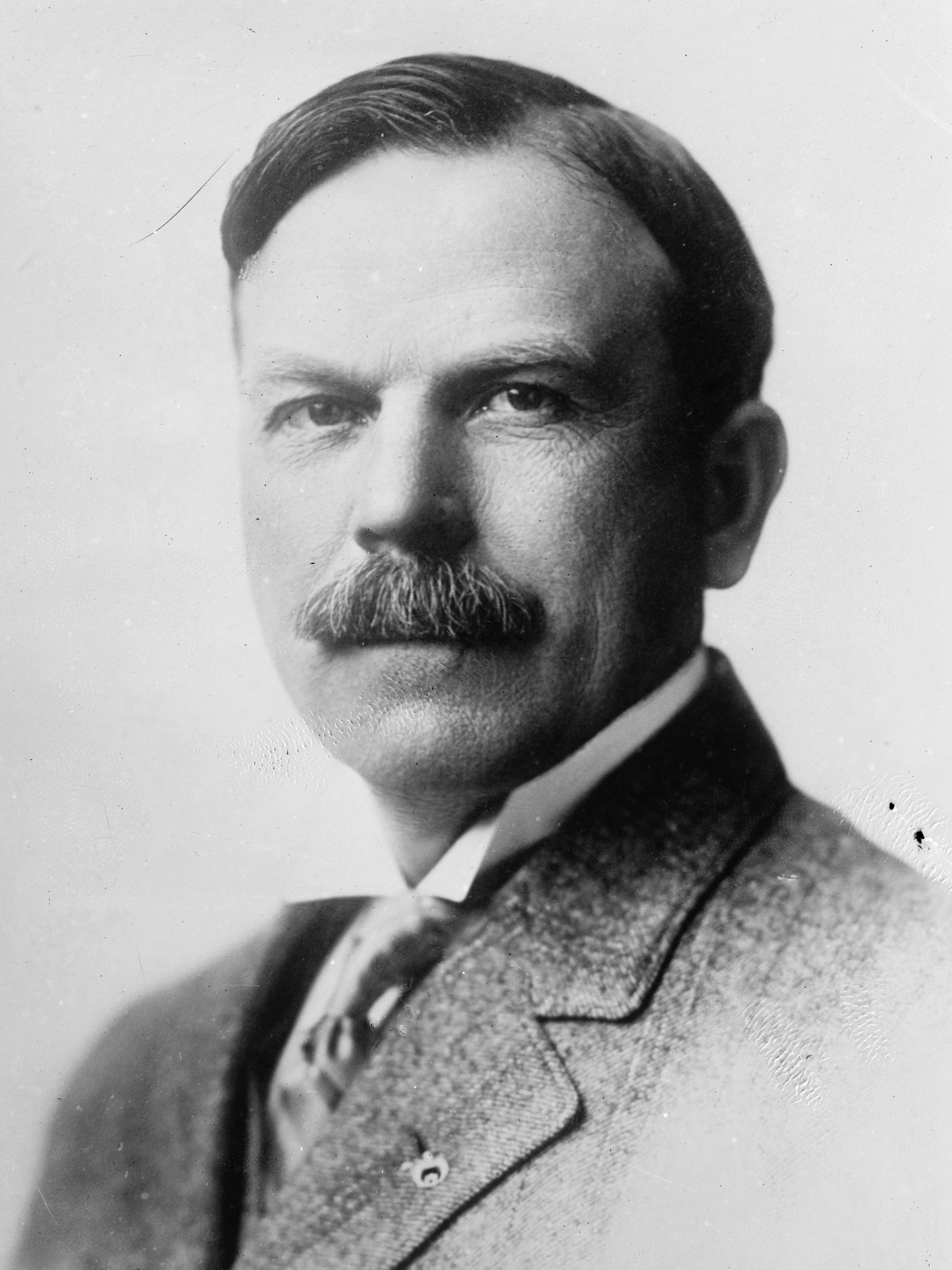

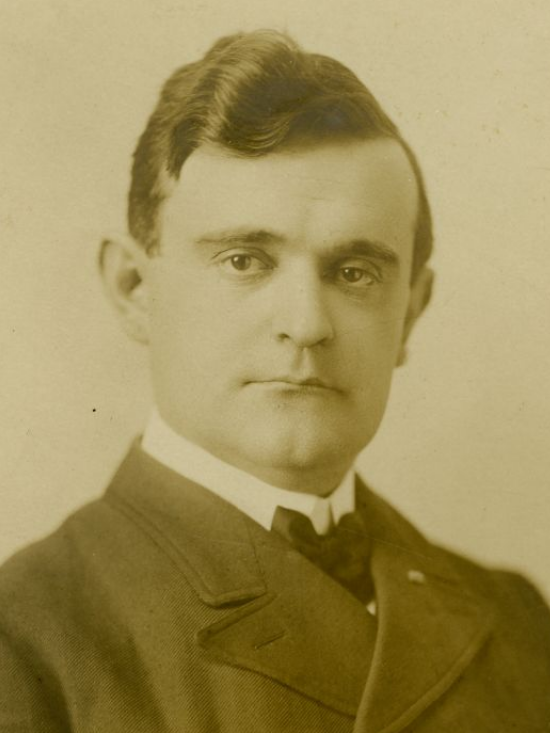
Nominee	Alden Anderson	Isidore B. Dockweiler
Party	Republican	Democratic
Popular vote	150,039	129,749
Percentage	50.83%	43.96%
Lieutenant Governor before election
Jacob H. Neff
Republican
Elected Lieutenant Governor
Alden Anderson
Republican

The 1902 California lieutenant gubernatorial election was held on November 4, 1902. Republican State Assemblyman Alden Anderson defeated Democratic Los Angeles Public Library President Isidore B. Dockweiler with 50.83% of the vote.

== General election ==
=== Candidates ===
- Alden Anderson, Republican
- Isidore B. Dockweiler, Democratic
- Frank R. Whitney, Socialist
- Simon Pease Meade, Prohibition

=== Results ===
1906 California lieutenant gubernatorial election
Party	Candidate	Votes	%	±%
Republican	Alden Anderson	150,039	50.83%	
Democratic	Isidore B. Dockweiler	129,749	43.96%	
Socialist	Frank R. Whitney	10,541	3.57%	
Prohibition	Simon Pease Meade	4,844	1.64%	
Majority		295,173		
Turnout				
Republican hold		Swing		
