= William H. Parks =

American politician

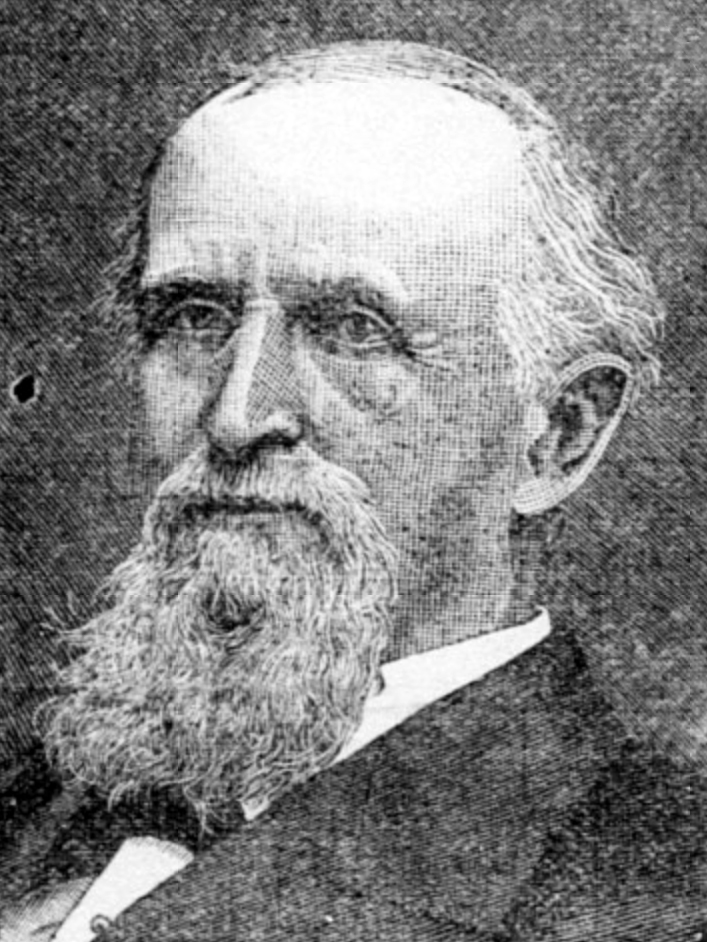

24th Speaker of the California State Assembly
- In office January 1885 – September 1886
- Preceded by: Hugh McElroy LaRue
- Succeeded by: William H. Jordan
- In office January 1881 – May 1881
- Preceded by: Jabez F. Cowdery
- Succeeded by: Hugh McElroy LaRue

Member of the California State Assembly
- In office 1881 – 1887
- Constituency: 25th district (1881–1885); 13th district (1885–1887)

Member of the California State Senate
- In office 1859 – 1865
- Constituency: 15th district (1859–1863); 23rd district (1863–1865)

Personal details
- Born: William H. Parks; May 30, 1824 Lake County, Ohio, U.S.
- Died: July 23, 1887 (aged 63) Marysville, California, U.S.
- Party: Democratic; Union; Republican
- Spouse: Annie Wilson (m. 1866)

William H. Parks (May 30, 1824 – July 23, 1887) was a politician from California who served in the California State Senate and California State Assembly, serving as the Speaker of the latter. He is one of only two people to be Speaker of the Assembly for two non-consecutive terms, the other being Frank Leslie Coombs. While in the State Senate, he was a candidate for President pro-tempore, but lost the election 25 to 1.

In 1867, he was a candidate for State Secretary of State but lost the election. Parks also served as Provost Marshal of the Northern District of California in the 1860s.

Preceded by Jabez F. Cowdery	Speaker of the California State Assembly; January 1881 – May 1881	Succeeded by Hugh McElroy LaRue
Preceded by Hugh McElroy LaRue	Speaker of the California State Assembly; January 1885 – September 1886	Succeeded by William H. Jordan
