= Isidore B. Dockweiler =

American lawyer and politician (1867–1947)

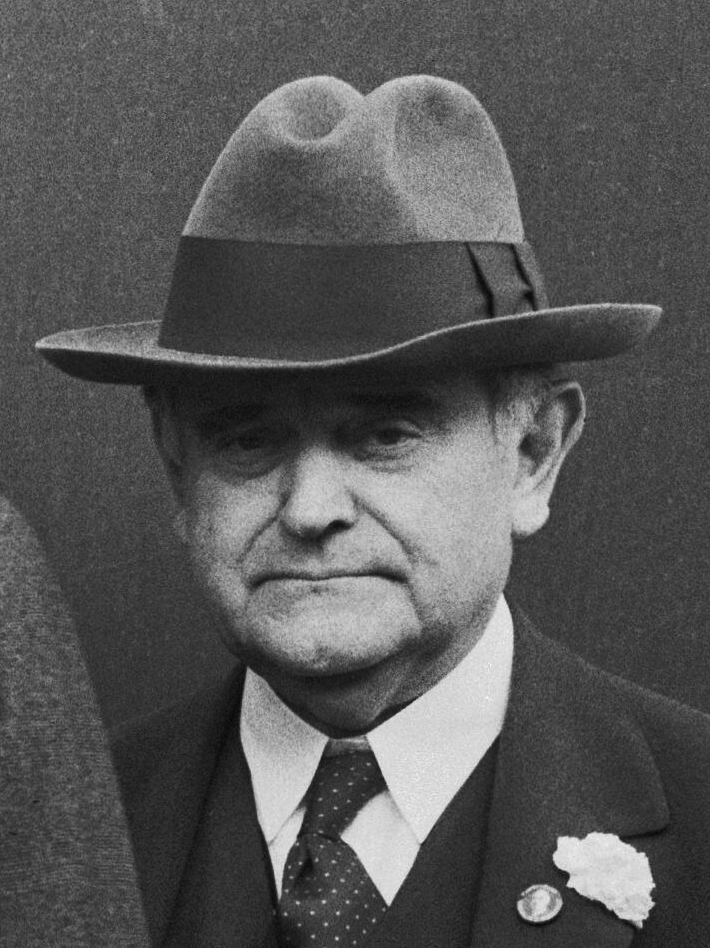
- Dockweiler in 1932
- Born: Isidore Bernard Dockweiler; December 28, 1867; Los Angeles, California
- Died: February 6, 1947 (aged 79); Los Angeles, California, U.S.
- Resting place: Calvary Cemetery
- Education: St. Vincent College
- Occupations: Lawyer, politician
- Political party: Democratic Party

Isidore Bernard Dockweiler (December 28, 1867 – February 6, 1947) was a prominent California lawyer and politician from a pioneering Los Angeles family.

== Biography ==
Isidore Bernard Dockweiler was born in Los Angeles on December 28, 1867, when the small city's population was less than 4,500, to Heinrich (Henry) Dockweiler and Margaretha Sugg. He was affectionately called "Pequeno Ysidro" by Bishop Francisco Mora y Borrell, then the prelate of La Iglesia de Nuestra Señora la Reina de los Ángeles in Los Angeles, who personally baptised him. Dockweiler would serve in his youth as Mora's "train bearer".

He graduated from St. Vincent College (now Loyola Marymount University) in 1887. Dockweiler was admitted to the practice of law October 14, 1889, practicing for 58 years. He married Gertrude Reeve, and he and his wife had 13 children, 11 of whom grew to adulthood. Several became attorneys: his son John Francis Dockweiler would become a Congressman, and later Los Angeles County District Attorney. George Dockweiler would become a superior court judge.

Dockweiler served on the Board of Directors of Security First National Bank (1922–1947).

=== Politics ===
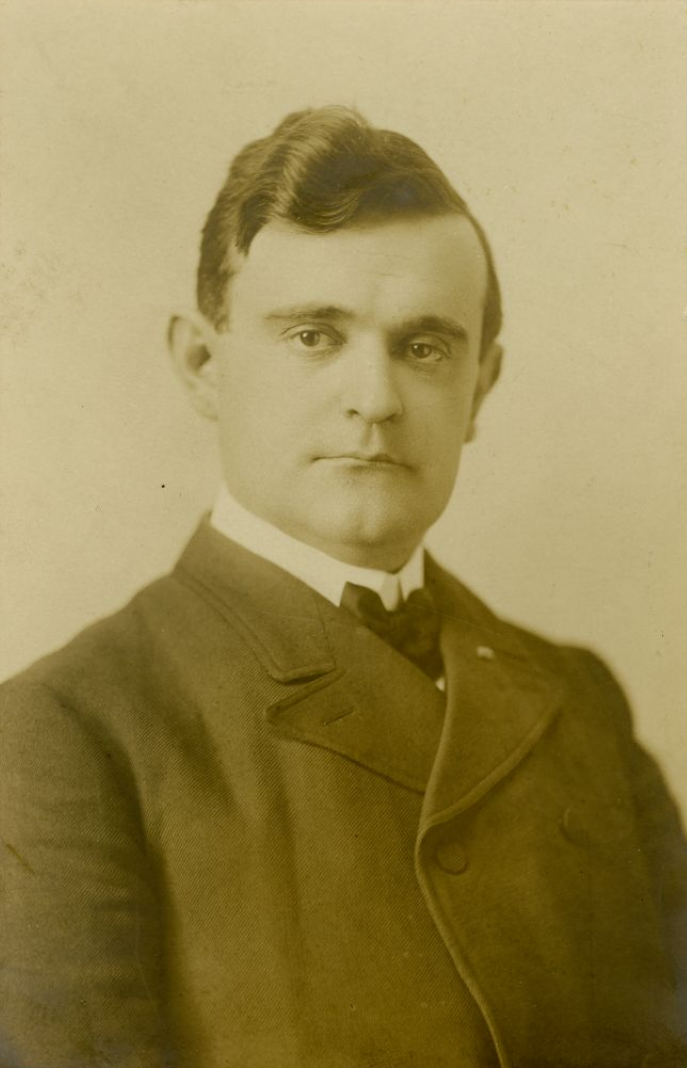
Dockweiler c. 1902

Dockweiler was the Democratic Party candidate for Lieutenant Governor of California in 1902, along with Franklin K. Lane as Governor of California. Governor-Elect Lane and Lt. Governor-Elect Dockweiler won the electorate's plurality by 25,000 votes, but lost on a minor legal technicality decided by the California Supreme Court - a controversial event. Republican George Cooper Pardee became Governor of California as a result.

Dockweiler helped secure California's vote for Woodrow Wilson, who would become President of the United States. Dockweiler was held in high esteem and confidence by Wilson. Lane served as U.S. Secretary of the Interior. When Lane resigned in 1920, Dockweiler was offered the position. Dockweiler declined due to family responsibilities of 11 children. Instead he was appointed by Wilson to the United States Board of Indian Commissioners (1913–1920).

He had numerous positions throughout his life, both local and national. He served as President of the Los Angeles City Library Commission. He was the Director of the Los Angeles Public Library (1897–1899) and as ex-President of same (1901–1911).

Dockweiler was defeated in the August 31, 1926 Democratic primary for the U.S. Senate nomination for California, losing to John B. Elliott. Elliott was the contestant sponsored by the then former U.S. Treasury Secretary William Gibbs McAdoo.

Dockweiler served thrice as a delegate to the Democratic National Conventions of 1908 (Denver), 1936 (Philadelphia), and 1940 (Chicago). He served as a member of the Democratic National Committee (DNC) (1916–1932). Will Rogers once characterized Dockweiler as "the Democratic Party of California".

=== Personal life ===
Dockweiler, a Roman Catholic, was awarded a pontifical knighthood by Pope Pius XI in the spring of 1924, as a Knight of St. Gregory (KSG) for meritorious service to the public, humanity, and the Catholic Church. He was a charter member of the Knights of Columbus. One of his sons, Thomas A. J. Dockweiler, would also receive knighthood later as a Knight Commander of Saint Gregory (KCSG).

In 1931 Dockweiler was instrumental in having a statue of Junípero Serra, the founder of the first Spanish missions in California and their Mission Indian Reductions, placed in Statuary Hall in Washington, D.C. He was also instrumental in getting a bill passed in the California Legislature making it the law to fly California's state Bear flag with the U.S. flag in or on public buildings. This would eventually be followed by other states for their state flags.

Isidore B. Dockweiler died at St. Vincent Hospital on February 6, 1947. He was interred in Calvary Cemetery (New Calvary Catholic Cemetery) in East Los Angeles.

== Legacy ==
Two streets, Dockweiler Street and Dockweiler Place, are named after him in Los Angeles. Isidore became aware of an effort to name a transportation arterial after him. Being humble, he did not like the idea. That street was eventually named Doheny (Edward Laurence Doheny), now part of Beverly Hills, California.

By an act of the U.S. Congress, Dockweiler Station Post Office, was named in his honor in Los Angeles. In 2019, this station was renamed in honor of singer Marvin Gaye.

On January 26, 1955, the California State Parks Commission upon request of California Governor Goodwin Knight renamed a portion of the then Venice-Hyperion Beach State Park in Playa del Rey to the Isidore B. Dockweiler Beach State Park, commonly known as Dockweiler Beach, to honor him and the contributions to the public by the Dockweiler Family. Dockweiler served as a member of that same commission from his appointment by California Governor Earl Warren on March 22, 1943, until his death.
