= James W. Silliman =

American politician

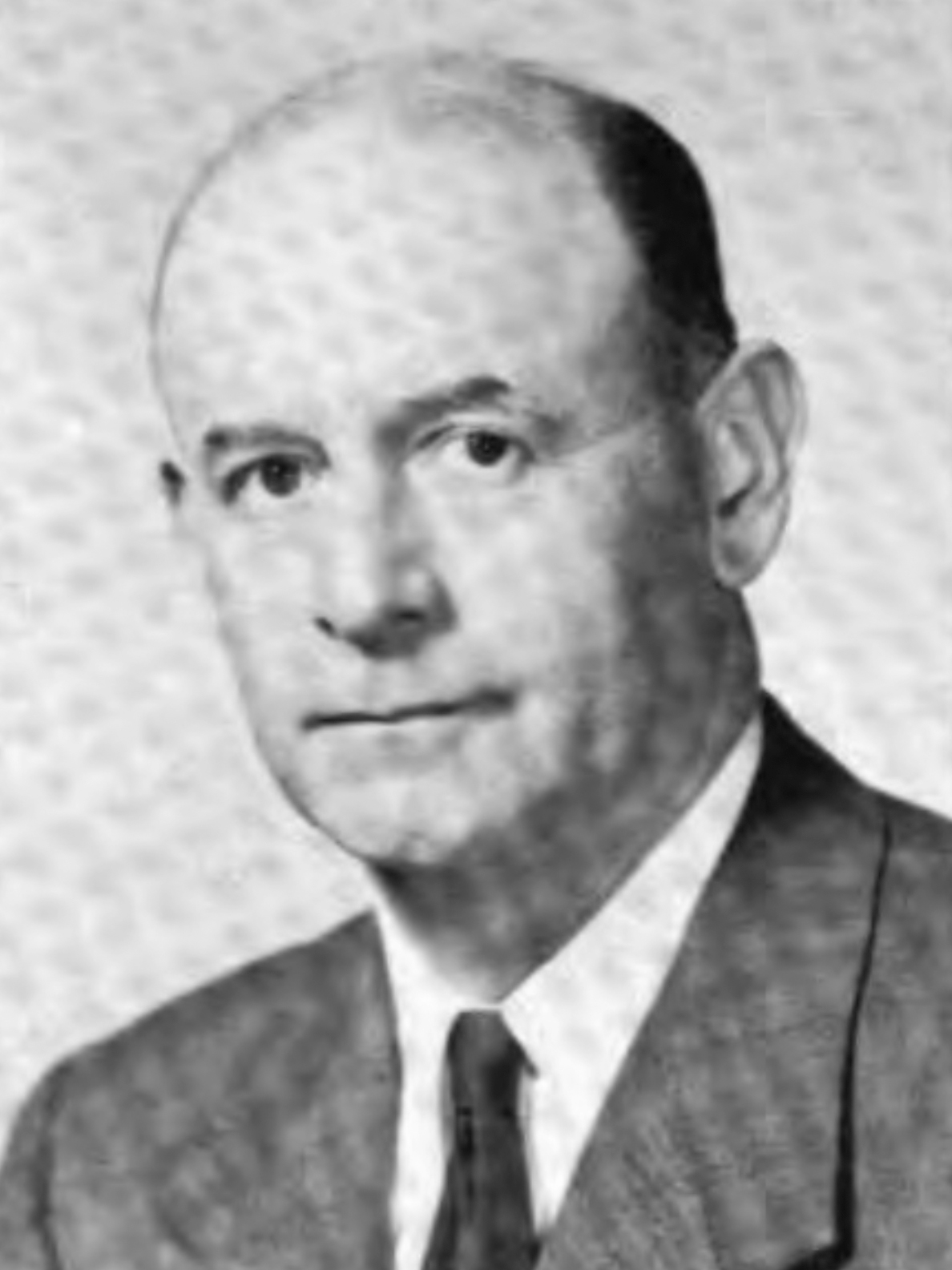

51st Speaker of the California State Assembly
- In office January 5, 1953 – April 1, 1954
- Preceded by: Sam L. Collins
- Succeeded by: Luther H. Lincoln

Member of the California State Assembly
- In office January 6, 1947 – January 3, 1955
- Preceded by: Fred Emlay
- Succeeded by: Alan G. Pattee
- Constituency: 33rd district (1947–1953); 34th district (1953–1955)

Personal details
- Born: James Willys Silliman; August 12, 1905 Castroville, California
- Died: October 21, 1976 (aged 71) Salinas, California
- Party: Republican
- Spouse: Nevelle Hawkins
- Children: 3

James Willys Silliman (August 12, 1905 – October 21, 1976) was a Republican politician from the US State of California, who served in the California State Assembly for the 33rd and 34th district from 1947 to 1955, including serving as Speaker of the Assembly from 1953 to 1954. He ran unsuccessfully for lieutenant governor in 1954 and for state senator in 1955.

California Assembly
Preceded by Wallace Henderson	California State Assemblyman, 34th District; 1953–1955	Succeeded by Alan G. Pattee
Preceded by Fred Emlay	California State Assemblyman, 33rd District; 1947–1953	Succeeded by William W. Hansen
Political offices
Preceded by Sam L. Collins	Speaker of the California State Assembly; January 5, 1953–April 1, 1954	Succeeded by Luther H. Lincoln
