= Alden Anderson =

American politician

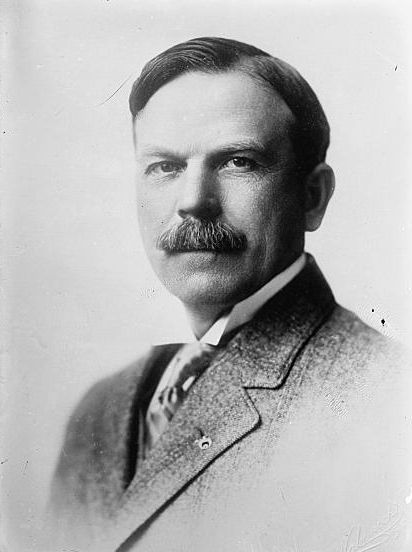

23rd Lieutenant Governor of California
- In office January 6, 1903 – January 8, 1907
- Governor: George C. Pardee
- Preceded by: Jacob H. Neff
- Succeeded by: Warren R. Porter

32nd Speaker of the California State Assembly
- In office January 1899 – February 1900
- Preceded by: Howard E. Wright
- Succeeded by: Cornelius W. Pendleton

Member of the California State Assembly from the 19th district
- In office January 4, 1897 – January 5, 1903
- Preceded by: J. M. Bassford
- Succeeded by: William Walter Greer

Personal details
- Born: October 11, 1867 Crawford County, Pennsylvania
- Died: September 23, 1944 (aged 76) Sacramento, California
- Party: Republican

Alden Anderson (October 11, 1867 – September 23, 1944) was a Republican politician from California.

He served as the 23rd lieutenant governor of California from 1903 to 1907. Prior to that he had been a member of the California State Assembly representing Solano County, and served as its Speaker from January 1899 to February 1900.

Although Anderson's father had first migrated to California from Pennsylvania shortly after the California Gold Rush in 1852, Anderson was born in Crawford County, Pennsylvania in 1867. His family returned to California several months later and settled in San Jose.

Anderson attended the University of the Pacific and afterward worked in his father's fruit packing business, before starting his own fruit business in Suisun City in Solano County. He went on to represent Solano County in the 1897 and 1901 sessions of the Legislature. Anderson moved to Sacramento in 1902, where he was a founder and president of the Capital National Bank.

Elected lieutenant governor in 1902, Anderson served for a single term under Governor George Pardee. He later served as state superintendent of banks from 1909 to 1910. Anderson ran for governor as a Republican in 1910 but was defeated in the primary by Hiram Johnson.

Anderson was the uncle of California Congressman Jack Z. Anderson.

Anderson died in 1944 at the age of 76. His remains are interred at East Lawn Memorial Park in Sacramento.

Political offices
Preceded by J. M. Bassford	California State Assemblyman, 19th District; 1897-1903	Succeeded by Walter W. Greer
Preceded by Howard E. Wright	Speaker of the California State Assembly; 1899-1900	Succeeded by Cornelius W. Pendleton
Preceded by Jacob H. Neff	Lieutenant Governor of California; 1903–1907	Succeeded by Warren R. Porter
