= Speaker of the California State Assembly =

Presiding officer of the California State Assembly

- Seal of the California State Assembly

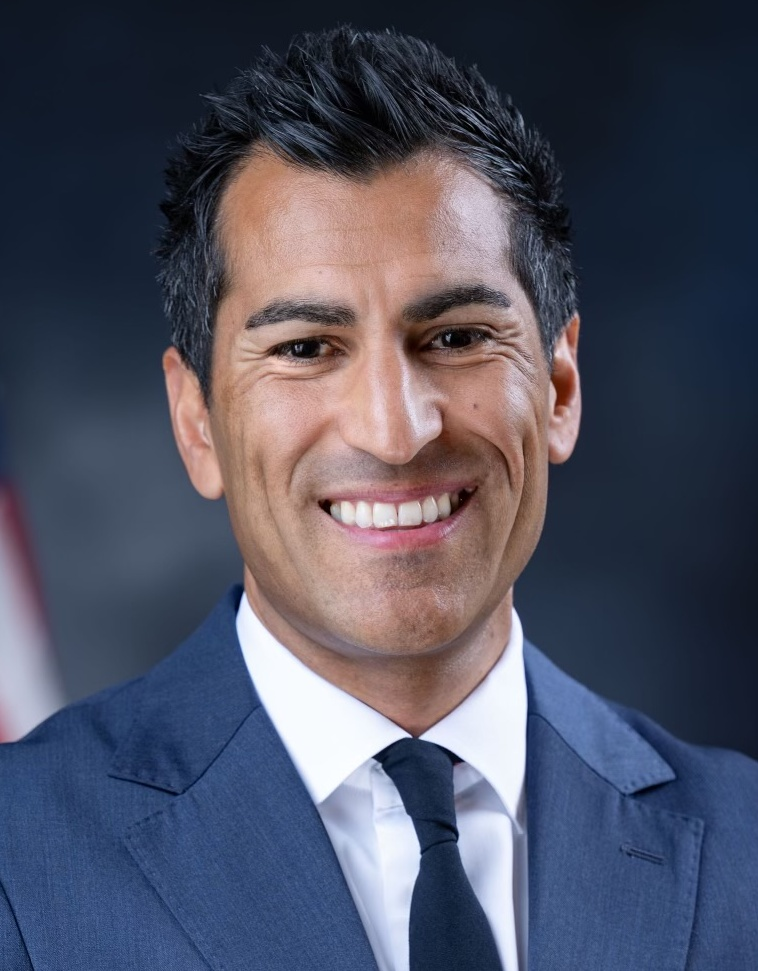
- Incumbent; Robert Rivas since June 30, 2023
- Style: Mister/Madam Speaker (informal); The Honorable (formal)
- Appointer: California State Assembly
- Term length: 2 years
- Inaugural holder: Thomas J. White
- Formation: 1849
- Succession: Third

The speaker of the California State Assembly is the presiding officer and highest-ranking member of the California State Assembly, controlling the flow of legislation and committee assignments. The speaker is nominated by the majority party's caucus and elected by the full Assembly typically at the beginning of each two year session. Meanwhile, other floor leaders, such as the majority leader and minority leaders, are elected by their respective party caucuses according to each party's strength in the chamber. The current speaker is Democrat Robert Rivas of the 29th district.

The speaker formerly had far more power, and was able to issue committee assignments to both parties' members, control State Assembly funds, and had broad administrative authority, but many of these powers were transferred to committee chairs after the speakership of Curt Pringle.

The speaker of the Assembly is also third in the order of succession to the governor of California, after the lieutenant governor and the president pro tempore of the California State Senate.

== List of speakers ==
The following is a list of speakers of the California State Assembly. It does not number those individuals who served abbreviated terms or those who served during an extraordinary session called by the governor of California for a narrowly defined agenda.

Speaker	Portrait	District	Party	Term of service
1. Thomas J. White		Sacramento	Unaffiliated ^{1}	December 1849–February 1850
2. John Bigler	John Bigler, 2nd Speaker (1850–1851)	12	Democratic	February 1850–May 1851
3. Richard P. Hammond		7	Democratic	January 1852–May 1852
4. Isaac B. Wall		6	Democratic	January 1853–May 1853
5. Lord Charles S. Fairfax		15	Democratic	January 1854–May 1854
6. William W. Stow		3	Whig	January 1855–May 1855
7. James T. Farley	James Farley, 7th Speaker (1856)	19	American	January 1856–April 1856
8. Elwood T. Beatty		19	Democratic	January 1857–April 1857
9. Ninian E. Whiteside		15	Democratic	January 1858–April 1858
10. William C. Stratton		17	Democratic	January 1859–April 1859
11. Phillip Moore		16	Democratic	January 1860–April 1860
12. Ransom Burnell		19	Douglas Democratic	January 1861–May 1861
13. George Barstow		8	Republican	January 1862–May 1862
14. Tim N. Machin		12	National Union	January 1863–April 1863
15. William H. Sears		21	National Union	December 1863–April 1864
16. John Yule	John Yule, 16th Speaker (1865-1866)	20	National Union	December 1865–April 1866
17. Caius T. Ryland	Caius Tacitus Ryland, 17th Speaker (1867-1868)	7	Democratic	December 1867–March 1868
18. George H. Rogers		8	Democratic	December 1869–April 1870
19. Thomas Bowles Shannon	Thomas Bowles Shannon, 19th Speaker (1871–1872)	8	Republican	December 1871–April 1872
20. Morris M. Estee	Morris M. Estee, 20th Speaker (1873–1874)	8	Independent ^{2}	December 1873–March 1874
21. Gideon J. Carpenter	Gideon J. Carpenter, 21st Speaker (1875–1876)	23	Democratic	December 1875–April 1876
22. Campbell Polson Berry	Campbell Berry, 22nd Speaker (1877–1878)	25	Democratic	December 1877–April 1878
23. Jabez F. Cowdery	Jabez F. Cowdery, 23rd Speaker (1880)	13	Republican	January 1880–April 1880
24. William H. Parks	William H. Parks, 24th Speaker (1881)	25	Republican	January 1881–May 1881
25. Hugh McElroy LaRue	Hugh McElroy LaRue, 25th Speaker (1883-1884)	18	Democratic	January 1883–May 1884
– William H. Parks	William H. Parks, 24th Speaker (1881)	25	Republican	January 1885–September 1886
26. William H. Jordan	William H. Jordan, 26th Speaker (1887)	55	Republican	January 1887–March 1887
27. Robert Howe	Robert Howe, 27th Speaker (1889)	25	Democratic	January 1889–March 1889
28. Frank Leslie Coombs		22	Republican	January 1891–March 1891
29. Frank H. Gould	Frank H. Gould 29th speaker (1893)	57	Democratic	January 1893–March 1893
30. John C. Lynch		8	Republican	January 1895–March 1895
– Frank Leslie Coombs		18	Republican	January 1897–March 1897
31. Howard E. Wright	Howard E. Wright, 31st speaker (1899)	51	Republican	January 1899
32. Alden Anderson		19	Republican	January 1899–February 1900
33. Cornelius W. Pendleton	Cornelius W. Pendleton, 33rd speaker (1901)	74	Republican	January 1901–March 1901
34. Arthur G. Fisk	Arthur Fisk, 34th Speaker (1903)	37	Republican	January 1903–March 1903
35. Frank C. Prescott	Frank C. Prescott, 35th speaker (1905–1906)	76	Republican	January 1905–June 1906
36. Robert L. Beardslee Sr.	Robert L. Beardslee, 36th speaker (1907–1909)	23	Republican	January 1907–November 1909
37. Phillip A. Stanton	Phillip A. Stanton, 37th speaker (1909–1910)	71	Republican	January 1909–October 1910
38. Arthur Hathaway Hewitt	Arthur Hathaway Hewitt, 38th speaker (1911)	8	Republican	January 1911–December 1911
39. C. C. Young	Clement C. Young, 39th Speaker (1913–1917)	41	Republican, Progressive ^{3}	January 1913–April 1917
40. Henry W. Wright		69	Republican	January 1919–April 1921
41. Frank F. Merriam	Frank Merriam, 41st Speaker (1923–1926)	70	Republican	January 1923–October 1926
42. Edgar C. Levey	Edgar Levey, 42nd Speaker (1927–1931)	28	Republican	January 1927–May 1931
43. Walter J. Little	Walter J. Little, 43rd Speaker (1933–1933)	60	Republican	January 1933–July 1933
44. Forsythe Charles Clowdsley		11	Democratic	September 1934 (extraordinary session)
45. Edward Craig		75	Republican	January 1935–May 1936
46. William Moseley Jones	William Jones, 46th Speaker (1937–1938)	51	Democratic	January 1937–March 1938
47. Paul Peek		71	Democratic	January 1939–June 1939
48. Gordon Hickman Garland	Gordon Garland, 48th Speaker (1940–1942)	38	Democratic	January 1940–January 1942
49. Charles W. Lyon	Charles Lyon, 49th Speaker (1943–1946)	59	Republican	January 1943–July 1946
50. Sam L. Collins	Sam L. Collins, 50th Speaker (1947-1952)	75	Republican	January 1947–August 1952
51. James W. Silliman		34	Republican	January 1953–April 1954
52. Luther H. Lincoln		15	Republican	January 1955–April 1958
53. Ralph M. Brown		30	Democratic	January 1959–September 1961
54. Jesse M. Unruh	Jesse M. Unruh, 54th Speaker (1961–1969)	65	Democratic	September 1961–January 1969
55. Robert T. Monagan	Robert Timothy Monagan, 56th Speaker (1969–1970)	12	Republican	January 1969–September 1970
56. Bob Moretti		42	Democratic	January 1971–June 1974
57. Leo T. McCarthy	Leo T. McCarthy, 57th Speaker (1970–1980)	19/18^{4}	Democratic	June 1974–November 1980
58. Willie Brown	Willie Brown, 58th Speaker (1980–1995)	17/13^{5}	Democratic	December 2, 1980 – June 5, 1995
59. Doris Allen		67	Republican ^{6}	June 5, 1995 – September 14, 1995
60. Brian Setencich		30	Republican ^{6}	September 14, 1995 – January 4, 1996
61. Curt Pringle	Curt Pringle, 61st Speaker (1996)	68	Republican	January 4, 1996 – November 30, 1996
62. Cruz M. Bustamante	Cruz Bustamante, 62nd Speaker (1996–1998)	31	Democratic	December 2, 1996 – February 26, 1998
63. Antonio Villaraigosa		45	Democratic	February 26, 1998 – April 13, 2000
64. Robert M. Hertzberg		40	Democratic	April 13, 2000 – February 6, 2002
65. Herb J. Wesson, Jr.		47	Democratic	February 6, 2002 – February 9, 2004
66. Fabian Núñez	Fabian Núñez, 66th Speaker (2004–2008)	46	Democratic	February 9, 2004 – May 13, 2008
67. Karen Bass		47	Democratic	May 13, 2008 – March 1, 2010
68. John Pérez		46/53^{7}	Democratic	March 1, 2010 – May 12, 2014
69. Toni Atkins		78	Democratic	May 12, 2014 – March 7, 2016
70. Anthony Rendon		63	Democratic	March 7, 2016 – June 30, 2023
71. Robert Rivas		29	Democratic	June 30, 2023 – present

- ^1 The First California Legislature was nonpartisan.
- ^2 Estee was also a style="color:black; background-color:#FFB6B6"|Republican, but he was elected to the term in which he was Speaker as an independent.
- ^3 Young was elected as a style="color:black; background-color:#FFB6B6"|Republican during the 40th and 42nd sessions (1913 and 1917), but a Progressive during the 41st session (1915).
- ^4 McCarthy's 19th District was renumbered the 18th District after the 1970s redistricting.
- ^5 Brown's 17th District was renumbered the 13th District after the 1990s redistricting.
- ^6 Allen and Setencich were Republican Assemblymembers whom Democrats elected after losing their majority in the chamber.
- ^7 Perez's 46th District was renumbered the 53rd District after the 2010s redistricting.

== See also ==
- List of California state legislatures
- List of majority leaders of the California State Assembly
- List of minority leaders of the California State Assembly
- President pro tempore of the California State Senate
