= Alma Francis =

American actress, dancer and singer (1890–1968)

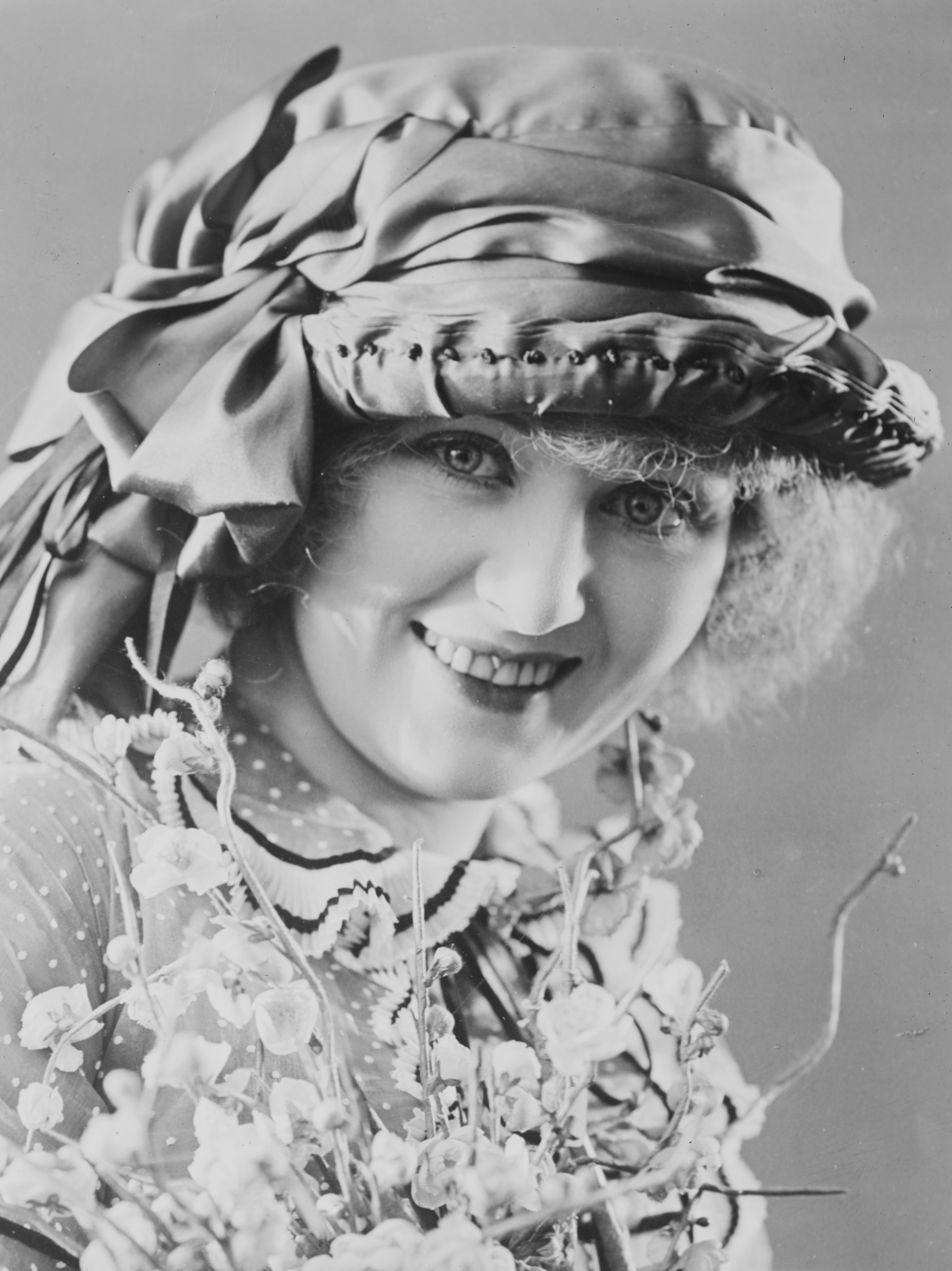
- Francis, c. 1920s
- Born: Alma Lenore Francis; October 15, 1890; Portland, Oregon, U.S.
- Died: August 21, 1968 (aged 77); Portland, Oregon, U.S.
- Resting place: Lone Fir Cemetery
- Education: St. Helens Hall
- Occupations: Actress; singer; dancer
- Years active: 1911–1934
- Spouses: Robert Gordon (m. 1919, divorced) Kenneth Fields (m. 1934)

Alma Lenore Francis (October 15, 1890 — August 21, 1968) was an American dancer, singer, and stage actress. She had an international career as a theatrical actress and operatic soprano in numerous stage productions, as well as a short-lived career in Hollywood, appearing in three feature films during the silent era.

A native of Portland, Oregon, Francis was educated at St. Helens Hall and later studied piano and operatic voice under Abbie Carrington in San Francisco. After completing her studies, Francis found success as a Broadway actress, obtaining lead roles in original productions of the musicals The Pink Lady (1911) and The Little Cafe (1913). She married film actor Robert Gordon in 1919. In the early-1920s, Francis signed a contract with Fox Film Corporation and appeared in three silent films, including a role in The Wolf Man (1924).

After abandoning her film career, Francis appeared in theater productions in California and toured Italy performing as an operatic soprano in various productions before returning to the United States in 1934. Francis spent her later life married to Kenneth N. Fields, a U.S. forest ranger, and living on a berry farm west of Sandy, Oregon, where she taught singing in her private home studio, and was an advocate of the arts in the Portland metropolitan area. She died on August 21, 1968, aged 77.

== Biography ==
=== 1890–1910: Early life ===
Alma Lenore Frances (Note: Francis's surname is sometimes misspelled "Frances.") was born October 15, 1890, in Portland, Oregon, to William and Alma Ray Francis (née Wilson). Both her maternal and paternal ancestors were Scottish pioneers, and her father was a mining engineer originally from Chicago who founded the St. Johns Lumber Company in Portland. She was educated at St. Helens Hall in Portland, and later studied piano in San Francisco under Emlyn Lewys, and operatic voice with Abbie Carrington.

=== 1911–1920: Early stage career ===
Francis began her career in theater, appearing on Broadway in the chorus line of a Lulu Glaser production. She had her first substantial role as Serpolette Pochet in the original 1911 production of The Pink Lady. She subsequently performed the supporting role of Angele in a Washington, D.C., production of The Pink Lady in December 1911. She also appeared in Glen MacDonough's production of Eva in 1912 (produced by A.L. Erlanger), and in 1913's musical comedy The Little Cafe. A review of Francis's performance in The Little Cafe published in the Brooklyn Eagle was critical of her performance, noting "the kindest thing to say is that she must have been suffering from a severe case of stage fright." In 1917, Francis inherited a substantial fortune from a distant relative in California, and used the money to invest in a fruit ranch in Santa Ana.

In April 1919, it was reported in the Los Angeles Times that Francis had married actor Robert Gordon in March that year in Los Angeles. Francis again made headlines in December 1919 for being one of the first stage actresses in the United States to gain the right to vote. She also performed as a dancer at the Waldorf–Astoria for the Metropolitan Opera Club in the spring of 1920.

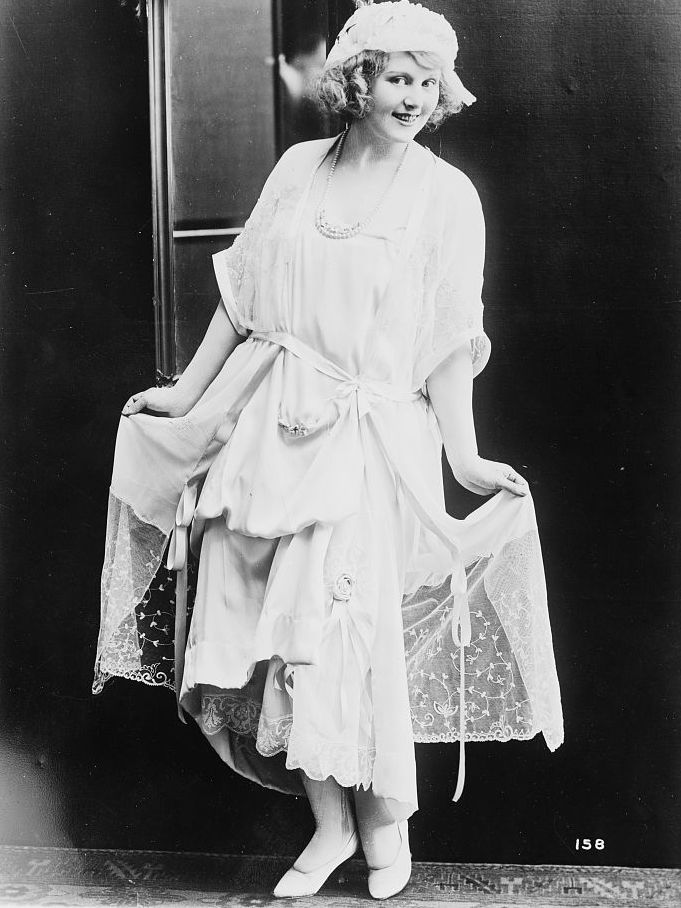
Francis c. 1920

=== 1920–1933: Hollywood and Italy ===
After appearing onstage for numerous years, Francis had a brief career in Hollywood, appearing in several films during the silent era for Fox Film Corporation. Among them were the horror film The Wolf Man (1924), in which she starred opposite John Gilbert and Norma Shearer, and Love Letters (also 1924), co-starring with Shirley Mason. In June 1922, Francis appeared on radio in San Francisco, performing songs from the musical So Long Letty.

After her role in Love Letters, Fox loaned Francis out to appear in a stage production of The Mission Play in Alhambra, California, which she starred in for three years under directors John S. McGroarty and Tyrone Power Sr.

Francis toured the opera circuit in Italy in the late-1920s through the early-1930s, appearing as the lead soprano in productions of La bohème, Faust, Madama Butterfly, and Pagliacci.

=== 1934–1968: Later life and teaching ===
After returning to the United States in 1934, Francis married Nelson Kenneth Fields, a United States Forest Service ranger, and resided with him on a berry farm west of Sandy, Oregon. She spent her later life teaching singing in Portland and in her private home studio, known by some locals as "The Little Milan." She was an advocate of the arts in the Portland area, and was a member of various local musical organizations, including the Oregon Music Teachers Association, Progressive Music Teachers, and the Mozart Club. She served as the president of the Sandy Music Club for Oregon Federation of Music Clubs.

== Death ==
Francis died on August 21, 1968, aged 77. Her funeral service was held on August 24, 1968, at Bateman Funeral Parlor in Gresham. She is interred at Lone Fir Cemetery.

== Filmography ==
Year	Title	Role	Notes	Ref.
1920	An Adventuress	Eunice		
1924	The Wolf Man	Beatrice Joyce	Lost film	
1924	Love Letters	Julia Crossland		

== Stage credits ==
Date(s)	Title	Role	Notes	Ref.
March 13, 1911 – December 9, 1911	The Pink Lady	Serpolette Pochet	Staged at New Amsterdam Theatre	
December 5, 1911	The Pink Lady	Angele	Staged at the National Theatre, Washington, D.C.	
December 30, 1912 – January 18, 1913	Eva	Pipsi Paquerette	Directed by Glen MacDonough; staged at New Amsterdam Theatre	
November 10, 1913 – March 14, 1914	The Little Cafe	Yvonne	Staged in Philadelphia and at New Amsterdam Theatre	
April 1921	In 1999		Staged at Neely Dickson's Hollywood Community Theatre	
c. 1924 – 1927	The Mission Play		Staged in Alhambra, California; directed by Tyrone Power Sr.	
Unknown	La bohème	Mimì	Performed in Italy	
Unknown	Faust	Marguerite	Performed in Italy	
Unknown	Madama Butterfly	Cio-Cio-san	Performed in Italy	
Unknown	Pagliacci	Nedda	Performed in Italy	

== Sources ==
- Jacobs, Jack; Braum, Myron (1976). The Films of Norma Shearer. New York: A. S. Barnes. ISBN 978-0-498-01552-6.
- Mercer, Jane (1975). Great Lovers of the Movies. New York: Crescent Books. ISBN 978-0-517-13126-8.
- Wray, Fay (1989). On the Other Hand: A Life Story. New York: St. Martins' Press. ISBN 978-0-312-02265-5.
