= Jim Driscoll (disambiguation) =

Jim Driscoll (1880–1925) was a Welsh boxer.

Jim Driscoll may also refer to:

- Jim Driscoll (American football)
- Jim Driscoll (baseball) (born 1944), American baseball player
- Jim Driscoll (hammer thrower) (born 1965), American hammer thrower

== See also ==
- James Driscoll (born 1977), American golfer
- James D. Driscoll (1931–2003), Chief Clerk of California Assembly
