= L. B. Mallory =

American politician

L.B. Mallory
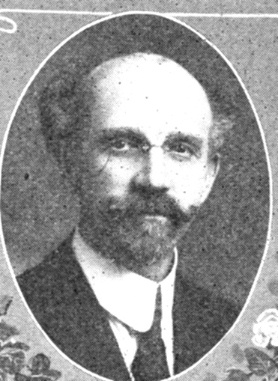
- Mallory, c. 1915

28th Chief Clerk of California Assembly
- In office 2 January 1911 – 8 January 1917
- Preceded by: Clio Lloyd
- Succeeded by: B.O. Boothby

Personal details
- Born: October 23, 1871 Nebraska, U.S.
- Died: March 1933 (aged 62)
- Profession: Broker

Llewellyn Bell Mallory (1871–1933) was an American politician who was the 28th chief clerk of the California Assembly from 1911 to 1917.

== Biography ==
He was born in Nebraska on October 23, 1871 and educated at Napa Valley College and Stanford University, A.B. 1897. His full-time profession was as a broker in the Bay Area. His business was located in Los Gatos, California. Mallory served as an assistant clerk in the California Assembly in 1909. He was elected for 3 terms as chief clerk, serving from 1911 to 1917. In California, the chief clerk is a nonpartisan officer of the legislature, responsible for advising the presiding officer on parliamentary rulings, guiding legislators on legislative procedures, and overseeing the records and votes of the house.

Mallory was associated with the Progressive Party. He was elected chief clerk during the Progressive wave of the 1910 election, which swept Progressive standard bearer Hiram Johnson and others into power. After his swearing-in as chief clerk in January 1911, Mallory's first act was to appoint Thomas G. Walker, who had served a few days as chief clerk during the 1910 extraordinary session, as first assistant chief clerk. In 1915, Mallory hired 21-year-old law school student Arthur Ohnimus as a committee clerk, who would quickly rise up through the ranks of assistant clerks and would himself go on to serve as chief clerk for 37 years. Mallory died in March 1933 at age 62.

== Sources ==
- Journals of the Assembly, California Legislature, 1911, 1913, 1915, 1917, 1933. View Assembly Journal archives online at http://www.assembly.ca.gov/clerk
- California Blue Book, 1913. Office of State Printing: Sacramento, 1913–1915.
