= Keeler v. Superior Court =

California judicial decision

- Supreme Court of California

Decided June 12, 1970
- Full case name: Robert Harrison Keeler, Petitioner, v. The Superior Court of Amador County, Respondent; The People, Real Party in Interest.
- Citation(s): 2 Cal. 3d 619; 470 P.2d 617; 87 Cal. Rptr. 481

Holding
- A defendant who intentionally killed a viable fetus cannot be charged with murder, as the California Penal Code's murder statute only refers to those already born.

Court membership
- Chief Justice: Louis H. Burke (Note: Acting Chief Justice)
- Associate Justices: Marshall F. McComb, Raymond E. Peters, Mathew Tobriner, Stanley Mosk, Raymond L. Sullivan, Paul Peek (Note: Assigned by chairman)

Case opinions
- Majority: Mosk, joined by McComb, Peters, Tobriner, Peek
- Dissent: Burke, joined by Sullivan

Laws applied
- Cal. Penal Code § 187

Keeler v. Superior Court, Supreme Court of California, 2 Cal. 3d 619 (1970), is a criminal case in which a man who deliberately killed a viable fetus in a woman, was determined not to be guilty of murder because the murder statute was written in 1850 when "human being" meant a person born alive, so there was no fair warning (legality), there being no common law crimes in California whereby statutory definitions can be changed by judicial decisions to broaden categories of crimes.

== Background ==
Robert Harrison Keeler and Teresa Keeler divorced after 16 years of marriage on September 27, 1968. Mr. Keeler was given custody their two daughters, aged 12 and 13 years which Mrs. Keeler had the right to take on alternating weekends. Unknown to Mr. Keeler, in the summer after the divorce Mrs. Keeler met Ernest Vogt, started living with him in Stockton, California and was pregnant with a baby girl by Mr. Vogt.

On February 23, 1969, the Keelers both met in cars, that they drove in opposite directions, on a narrow mountain road in Amador County to drop off the children to return home. During the meeting, Mr. Keeler walked over to Mrs. Keeler, who was sitting in her vehicle and rolled her window down, and calmly said "I hear you're pregnant. If you are you had better stay away from the girls and from here." She did not reply. Mr. Keeler then assisted her out of the car and got upset after looking at her abdomen. Mr. Keeler then said "You sure are. I'm going to stomp it out of you." and then proceeded to push Mrs. Keeler against the car, shoved his knee into her abdomen and struck her face several times until she fainted. When Mrs. Keeler regained consciousness, Mr. Keeler had left.

Mrs. Keeler proceeded to return to Stockton and called the police and medical assistance. She had substantial facial injuries, and bruising of the abdominal wall. A Caesarian section was performed to examine the fetus in utero and determined it must be delivered stillborn. The head was found to be severely fractured and cerebral hemorrhaging, which a pathologist determined to be the cause of death due to force applied to the mother's abdomen. Ms. Keeler's obstetrician testified that prior to the incident on February 23, 1969, the fetus had movement. Expert testimony determined the fetus was at stage of viability, prior to the attack and that even with a 75 percent to 96 percent chance of survival with premature birth.

Mr. Keeler was charged with three counts: Cal. Penal Code, § 187 the murder of the baby, a human, with malice aforethought, Cal. Penal Code § 273d infliction of traumatic injury upon his wife, and Cal. Penal Code § 245 assault with force on Mrs. Keeler producing great bodily injury. Mr. Keeler made a motion to set aside information for lack of probable cause which was denied by the court. Mr. Keeler then filed for a writ of prohibition on the murder count to decide whether an unborn but viable fetus is a "human being" within the meaning of the California statute defining murder.

== Decision ==
The court issued a peremptory writ of prohibition stating that an unborn fetus is not a human being within the definitions of the California's murder statute. Penal Code section 187 enacted in 1872 provides: "Murder is the unlawful killing of a human being, with malice aforethought." The section was taken in verbatim from the Crimes and Punishments Act of 1850. As early as 1797, a human must have been "born alive" is necessary to support an indictment for murder. The court argued that in American case law that the killing of an unborn child was not homicide and that many legislatures proposed a special feticide statute to modify the common law. California did not enact any feticide statutes at the time.

== Dissent ==
The dissent argued that the fetus was alive and viable at the time of her death, being in the 35th week of development. The definition of human being must be fairly and reasonably interpreted to promote justice and carry out the evident purposes of the Legislature in adopting a homicide statute. It should not be presumed that the Legislature ignored common law developments and intended to punish the malicious killing of a viable fetus as the lesser offense of illegal abortion.
