= James G. Smyth =

American politician

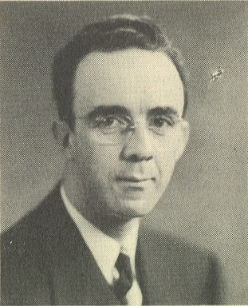

32nd Chief Clerk of California Assembly
- In office January 4, 1937 – January 2, 1939
- Preceded by: Arthur Ohnimus
- Succeeded by: Jack Carl Greenburg

Personal details
- Party: Nonpartisan office, but registered as Democrat
- Spouse: unknown
- Profession: USF lecturer; insurance broker; Tax Collector

James George Smyth was a California political figure in the early 20th century. He was active in Democratic politics, served a term in the 1930s as the Chief Clerk of the California Assembly, and later served as an IRS official in the administrations of Franklin D. Roosevelt and Harry S. Truman. In 1951, he was indicted on federal tax fraud charges and later acquitted.

James G. Smyth received his bachelor's degree from the University of San Francisco in 1927. He served as a faculty member in the USF English department 1927–1929. From 1929–1933, he was USF's graduate manager. Smyth was also employed in the advertising and public relations industries, and as an official of the Home Owners' Loan Corporation.

Active in Democratic politics in San Francisco, Smyth was the general manager of the Democratic State Central Committee offices and activities in northern California in the 1930s. Smyth was also an official on the Roosevelt-Garner presidential campaign in 1936. In 1937, Smyth was chosen to replace fellow San Franciscan Arthur Ohnimus as Chief Clerk of the California Assembly, when the Republican Ohnimus chose not to seek reelection. The Chief Clerk is a nonpartisan officer of the legislature. (Four years later, in 1941, Democrats would bring Ohnimus back, under the leadership of Democratic Assembly Speaker Gordon Hickman Garland).

Thus, Smyth ended up serving as Chief Clerk for two years (1937 and 1938), under Democratic Speakers William Moseley Jones and Paul Peek. Smyth was succeeded on January 2, 1939 by Jack Carl Greenburg, who served two years as Chief Clerk before Ohnimus returned to his role as clerk of the house on January 6, 1941.

Smyth was also director of exhibits and special events of the California Commission for the Golden Gate International Exposition (also known as the 1939 World's Fair at Treasure Island).

After leaving the legislature, Smyth served as Alternate for the Democratic National Convention from California in 1940 and 1944. He was appointed by President Roosevelt as IRS Collector of Revenue for Northern California in 1945. Smyth was a member of the famous San Francisco political machine run by Democratic party boss William M. Malone.

== Acquitted in 1951 IRS Scandal ==
On September 27, 1951, President Truman suspended nine IRS officials in California, including Smyth, as part of a federal investigation into embezzlement and tax fraud within the IRS. U.S. Commissioner of Internal Revenue, John B. Dunlap, was investigating irregularities in IRS offices in San Francisco, Boston, New York, and St. Louis. The investigations ultimately led to 57 firings within the IRS. On December 11, 1951, a federal grand jury indicted Smyth and his aides for tax fraud. Smyth was acquitted in 1952. This national scandal weakened the Malone political machine in San Francisco and made way for the rise of a more liberal party operation run by Malone's rival, the politically savvy Phillip Burton.

In June 1959, Smyth was appointed State Inheritance Tax Appraiser by State Controller Alan Cranston.

== Sources ==
- A Rage for Justice, John Jacobs, 1997.
- California Blue Book, 1938, California Office of State Printing.
- LA Times, May 4, 1951 (p. 10); Sept. 28, 1951 (p. 1); June 11, 1952 (p. 27), June 11, 1959 (p. 26)
- Time Magazine, October 13, 1952; July 12, 1954.
- California's Legislature (2006 edition), California State Assembly, p. 246, p. 265.
- San Francisco Chronicle, January 3, 1937.
- San Francisco Call, January 4, 1937.
- Sacramento Bee, January 6, 1937.
