= Jack Carl Greenburg =

American lawyer

33rd Chief Clerk of California Assembly
- In office 2 January 1939 – 6 January 1941
- Preceded by: James G. Smyth
- Succeeded by: Arthur Ohnimus

Personal details
- Born: January 4, 1909
- Died: c. December 1990 (aged 81)
- Party: Nonpartisan office, but registered as Democrat
- Spouse: Sophie
- Profession: Attorney

Jack Carl Greenburg (January 4, 1909 – c. December 1990) was a Los Angeles attorney who served as Chief Clerk of the California Assembly from 1939 to 1941.

Greenburg was born in Chicago, Illinois. Jack Greenburg was the son of Jenny (Kestlinger) and Lewis Greenburg. He received his Bachelor's degree from the University of Illinois in 1930 and his law degree from University of Southern California Law School in 1933. He served as President of the national professional commerce and law fraternity Lambda Gamma Phi in 1931.

In the late 1930s, Greenburg was drawn to legislative activities in Sacramento. Greenburg served as Assistant Chief Clerk of the Assembly in 1937, under Chief Clerk James G. Smyth. Greenburg was elected Chief Clerk on January 2, 1939. Greenburg was a registered Democrat serving in the nonpartisan role of Chief Clerk, and he received unanimous votes from both Republican and Democratic members of the legislature during his tenure in the Assembly.

On January 29, 1940, Governor Culbert Olson called the Legislature into Special Session to deal with myriad issues, including the unemployment problem in Depression-era California. Greenburg was elected as Chief Clerk for this extraordinary session as well.

Greenburg was succeeded in January 1941 by Arthur Ohnimus, who returned as Assembly Chief Clerk after a four-year hiatus. Ohnimus would go on to serve another 22 years as clerk.

In July 1941, Greenburg was appointed as secretary to Lt. Governor Ellis E. Patterson.

In later years, Greenburg would return to Los Angeles to practice law.
