= San Gabriel Mission Playhouse =

Theater and movie theater in San Gabriel, California, United States

Coordinates: 34.09837°N 118.10829°W

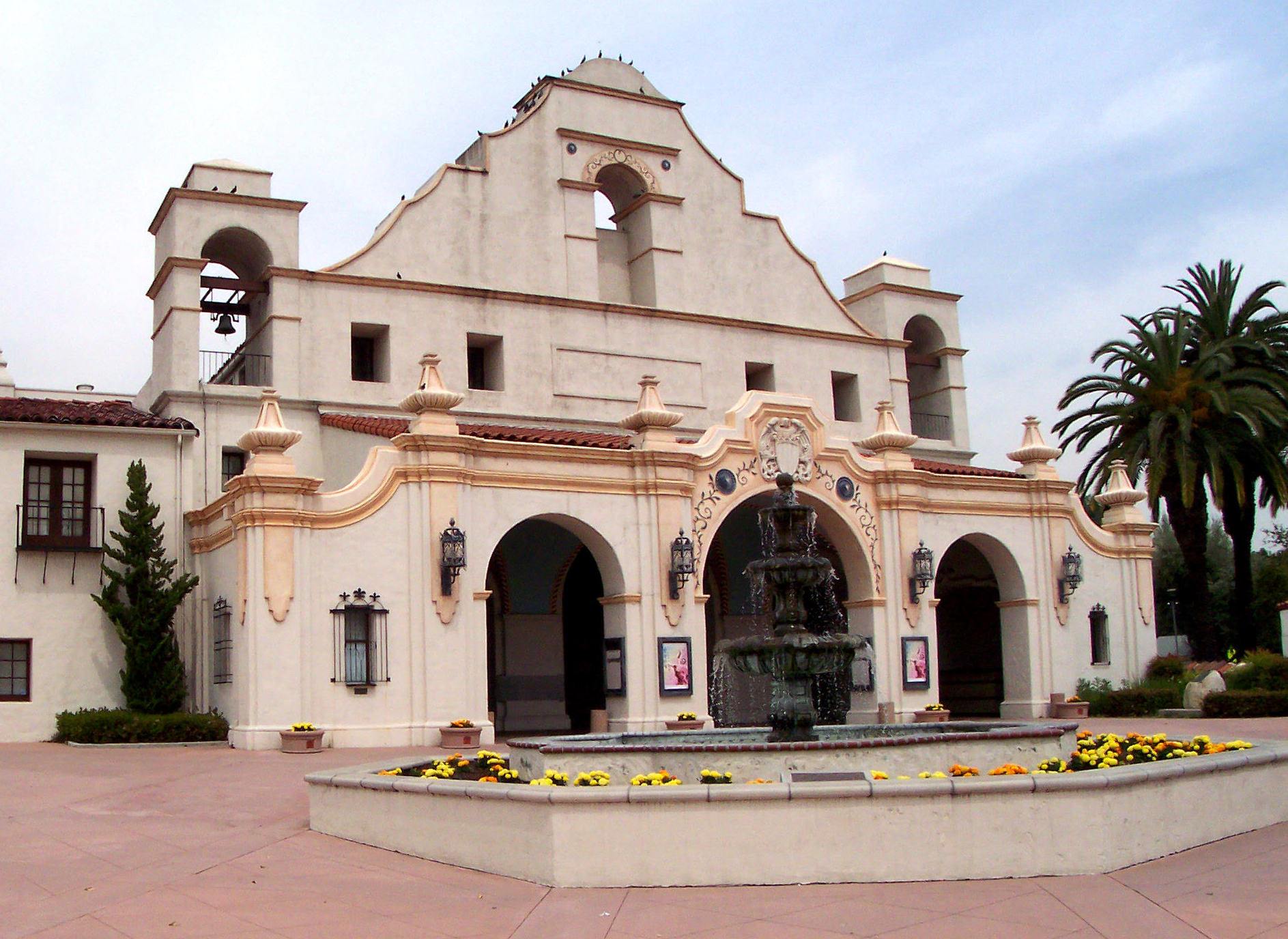
San Gabriel Mission Playhouse

The San Gabriel Mission Playhouse is a historic performing arts venue located in the Mission District of the city of San Gabriel, California, United States.

== History ==
The Playhouse was constructed between 1923 and 1927 for John Steven McGroarty’s hugely successful Mission Play. Architect Arthur Burnett Benton designed the Playhouse in the Mission Revival style. The façade was designed to resemble McGroarty’s favorite mission, San Antonio de Padua in Monterey County. The 1,387-seat theater has Native American influences in its painted and carved ceiling. Replicas of Spanish lanterns used aboard galleons in the 1800s hang from the ceiling. Woven tapestries that were a gift from King Alfonso XIII of Spain in 1927 adorn the sides of the theater. The theater is home to a fully restored 1924 Wurlitzer pipe organ originally built for the Albee Theatre in Brooklyn, New York.

After the run of The Mission Play, the Mission Playhouse was used as a movie theatre. During WWII, the dressing rooms were turned into apartments. Since 1945, the Playhouse has been owned and operated by the City of San Gabriel. When the city purchased the Playhouse, they renamed it the San Gabriel Civic Auditorium. On September 26, 2007, the theatre was renamed and once again called the Mission Playhouse.

The Playhouse is said to be haunted by the spirit of its original owner, known affectionately by locals as "Uncle John".

The Playhouse has been used as a film location for various TV series and movies such as The Love Boat and Remington Steele. Throughout the years, many notable names have graced the Playhouse stage including B.B. King, Tippi Hedren, Lilly Tomlin and Tony Bennett.
