= Love Letters (1924 film) =

1924 film directed by David Selman

Love letters
- Directed by: David Selman (as David Soloman)
- Screenplay by: Doty Hobart
- Based on: "Morocco Box" by Frederick J. Jackson
- Produced by: William Fox
- Starring: Shirley Mason; Gordon Edwards; Alma Francis
- Production company: Fox Film Corporation
- Release date: February 10, 1924 (US)
- Running time: 5 reels
- Country: United States
- Language: Silent (English intertitles)

Love letters is a 1924 American silent drama film directed by David Selman (credited as David Soloman) and written by Doty Hobart, which stars Shirley Mason, Gordon Edwards, and Alma Francis. John Miljan made his film debut in a supporting role.

== Plot ==
As described in a film magazine review, Julia Crossland is living very happily with her husband and sister. Evelyn Jefferson is equally happy with the thoughts of her upcoming marriage to Jimmy Stanton, who has just accepted a position as secretary to Thomas Chadwick. He rents a house for his employer next to that of the Crossland's. When the sisters meet Thomas, they realize that he is the man they both love and secretly wrote passionate love letters to. Evelyn attempts to get the letters, but is unsuccessful. Chadwick is killed. When the Morocco box containing the letters is opened, everyone finds that the man has personally destroyed all evidence of his past amours.

== Cast list ==
- Shirley Mason as Evelyn Jefferson
- Gordon Edwards as Jimmy Stanton
- Alma Francis as Julia Crossland
- John Miljan as Thomas Chadwick
- William Irving as Don Crossland

== Preservation ==
With no holdings located in archives, Love Letters is considered a lost film.
