= The Wolf Man (1924 film) =

1924 film by Edmund Mortimer

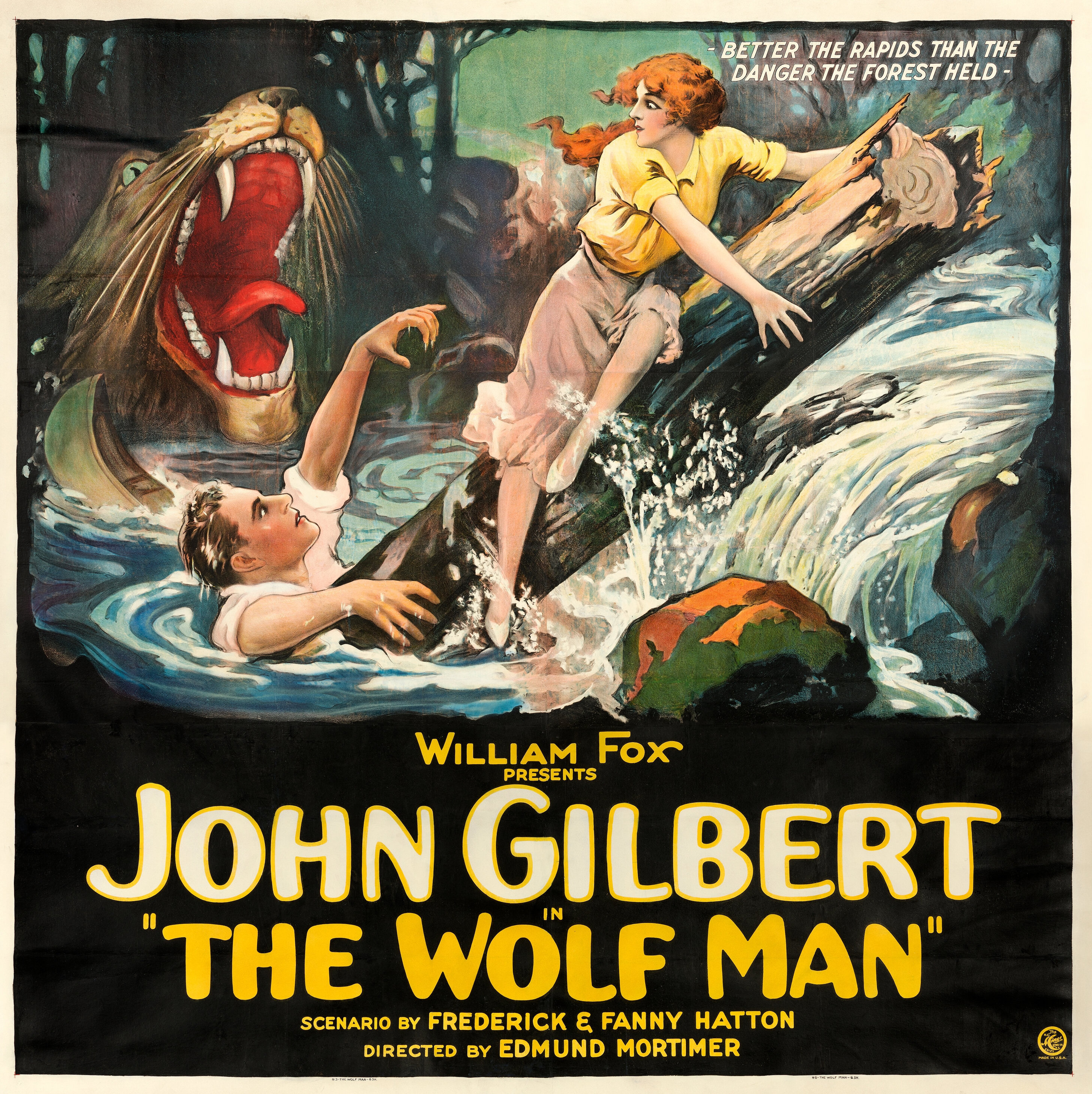
- Film poster
- Directed by: Edmund Mortimer
- Written by: Fanny Hatton; Frederic Hatton
- Story by: Reed Heustis
- Produced by: William Fox
- Starring: John Gilbert; Norma Shearer
- Cinematography: Michael Farley; Don Short
- Distributed by: Fox Film Corporation
- Release date: February 17, 1924
- Running time: 60 minutes
- Country: United States
- Languages: Silent; English intertitles

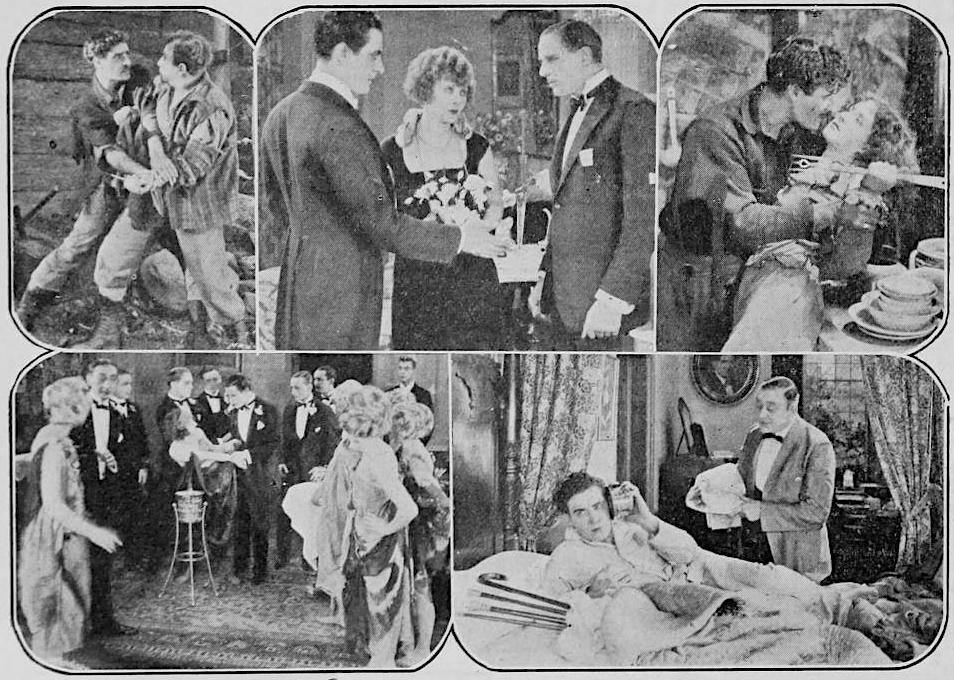
Scenes from the film

The Wolf Man is a 1924 American silent drama film that starred John Gilbert and Norma Shearer, before they signed with the newly formed MGM. Directed by Edmund Mortimer, the film's story was written by Reed Heustis, and written by Fanny and Frederic Hatton. The Wolf Man is now considered lost.

== Plot ==
Gerald Stanley (John Gilbert) is an English gentleman who is engaged to Beatrice Joyce (Alma Frances). Stanley's personality changes whenever he drinks, and his brother (who also loves Beatrice) uses this to his advantage. After Stanley's latest blackout, his brother informs him that Stanley killed Beatrice's brother. The horrified Stanley flees from England and goes to live in Quebec. Once sober, Stanley stays away from liquor until he receives word that Beatrice has married his brother. The news sends him on a drinking spree and once again he turns beastly.

In a saloon he gets in a fight and kidnaps Elizabeth Gordon (Norma Shearer), a respectable young girl who has wandered off from her father during a trip through the woods. Stanley takes Elizabeth to his shack, where he tries to force himself on her. His pursuers are closing in so he leaps in a canoe for a wild ride down the rapids. This sobers him up and, mortified by his actions, he apologizes profusely to Elizabeth. When she sees the real Stanley, she falls in love with him, and later on he receives word that Beatrice's brother was never killed.

== Cast ==
- John Gilbert as Gerald Stanley
- Norma Shearer as Elizabeth Gordon
- Alma Francis as Beatrice Joyce
- George Barraud as Lord Rothstein
- Eugene Pallette as Pierre
- Edgar Norton as Sir Reginald Stackpoole
- Thomas R. Mills as Caulkins
- Max Montisole as Phil Joyce
- Charles Wellesley as Sam Gordon
- Richard Blaydon as Lt. Esmond
- D.R.O. Hatswell as Lord St. Cleve
- Mary Warren as English barmaid
- Ebba Mona as Ballet girl

== See also ==
- 1937 Fox vault fire
