= Fred R. Pierce =

American judge (1899-1983)

Fred R. Pierce

Fred R. Pierce (October 22, 1899 – May 6, 1983) was a Presiding Justice of the California Third District Court of Appeal, having been appointed to the post by Governor Pat Brown in 1962.

Born in Sacramento, California, Pierce was a member of the U.S. Marine Corps Reserve during World War I and went on to receive an A.B. from Stanford University in 1921. He went on to study at the University of Washington and studied law in the office of Steven W. Downey, gaining admission to the California State Bar in 1923. From 1923–1927, he was an attorney with the California State Reclamation Board.

Pierce entered the U.S. Navy during World War II. A beachmaster at the Battle of Okinawa, he was discharged as a Lieutenant Commander when the war ended.

Governor Pat Brown appointed Pierce to the Sacramento County Superior Court in 1959, appointed him an Associated Justice of the California Third District Court of Appeal in October 1961, and then elevated him to Presiding Justice in December 1962. Retiring from the court in September 1971, Pierce died in Sacramento May 6, 1983.

Legal offices
Preceded by Paul Peek	Associate Justice of the California Court of Appeal for the Third District; October 1961 – December 1962	Succeeded by Leonard M. Freidman
Preceded by Paul Peek	Presiding Justice of the California Court of Appeal for the Third District; December 1962 – September 1971	Succeeded by Frank K. Richardson
