= Li v. Yellow Cab Co. =

1975 California Supreme Court decision

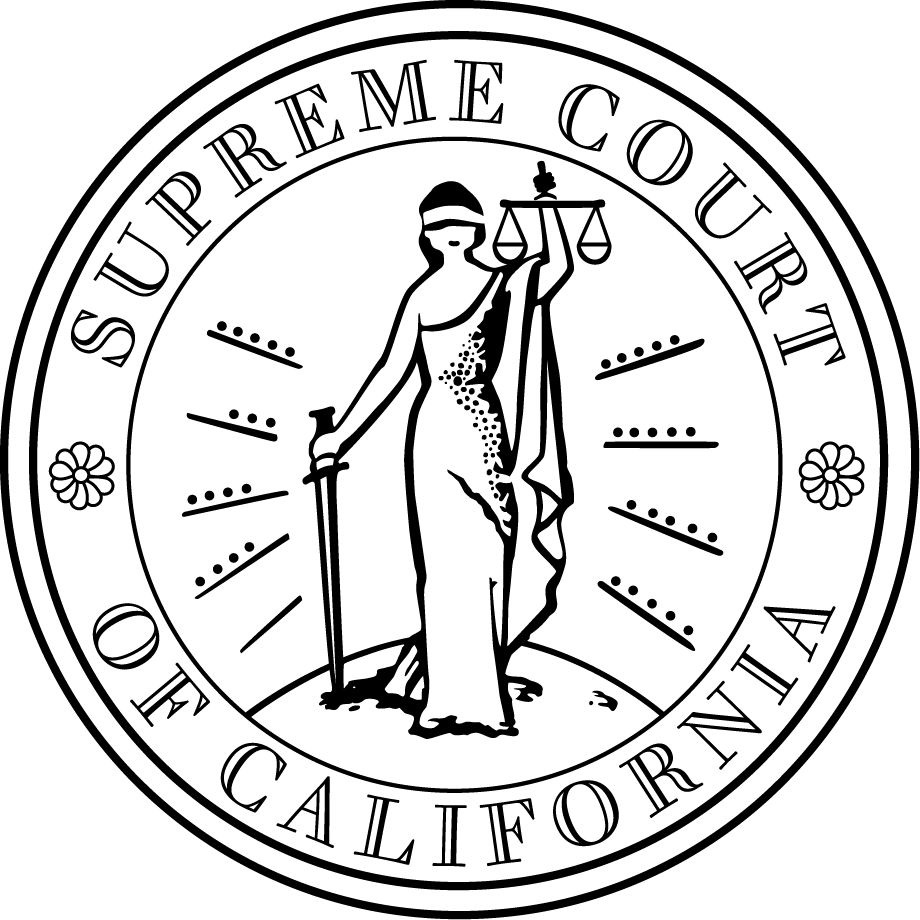
- Court: Supreme Court of California
- Full case name: Li v. Yellow Cab Co.
- Decided: March 31, 1975
- Citations: 13 Cal.3d 804; 532 P.2d 1226

Case opinions
- Decision by: Raymond L. Sullivan
- Dissent: William P. Clark Jr.

Li v. Yellow Cab Co., 13 Cal.3d 804, 532 P.2d 1226 (1975), commonly referred to simply as Li, is a California Supreme Court case that judicially embraced comparative negligence in California tort law and rejected strict contributory negligence.

== Background ==
The case came out of a traffic accident between the plaintiff and the defendant in which both of them had been found to have been driving negligently. The plaintiff (Li) had attempted to cross three lanes of oncoming traffic to enter a service station; the defendant's (Yellow Cab Co.) driver was traveling at an excessive speed when he ran a yellow light just before striking the plaintiff's car. The doctrine of contributory negligence in California law at the time would have prevented any recovery to Li.

== Decision ==
The California Supreme Court, aware of the recent trend toward comparative rather than contributory negligence, took the opportunity to reconsider the state's tort law on the subject.

The only unique feature of the case was its reasoning on Section 1714 of the Civil Code, which had been thought to codify the "all-or-nothing" approach to contributory negligence:

Everyone is responsible, not only for the result of his willful acts, but also for an injury occasioned to another by his want of ordinary care or skill in the management of his property or person, except so far as the latter has, willfully or by want of ordinary care, brought the injury upon himself. The extent of liability in such cases is defined by the Title on Compensatory Relief.

The plain meaning of section 1714 was quite clear, but the court concluded that the California State Legislature had not meant to stop the evolution of the common law, which is quite normal in state tort law, but rather only to clarify the law that existed at the time.
