= William E. Evans (politician) =

American politician (1877–1959)

William E. Evan’s
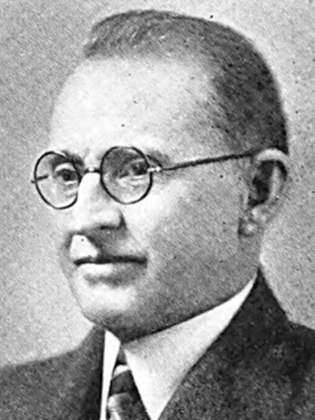

Member of the U.S. House of Representatives from California
- In office March 4, 1927 – January 3, 1935
- Preceded by: Walter F. Lineberger
- Succeeded by: John S. McGroarty
- Constituency: 9th district (1927–1933); 11th district (1933–1935)

Personal details
- Born: William Elmer Evans; December 14, 1877 Laurel County, Kentucky
- Died: November 12, 1959 (aged 81) Los Angeles, California
- Resting place: Forest Lawn Cemetery
- Party: Republican
- Education: Sue Bennett Memorial College
- Profession: Politician, Attorney, Real estate, Banking

William Elmer Evans (December 14, 1877 – November 12, 1959) was a lawyer, real estate developer, and politician, who served as a Republican United States Congressman from California's 9th and 11th congressional district. Overall, he served four terms from 1927 to 1935.

== Biography ==
William Elmer Evans was born in Laurel County, Kentucky, in 1877. He was educated at public schools and attended Sue Bennett Memorial College, in London, Kentucky.

=== Early career ===
Evans studied law and was admitted to the bar in 1902, commencing practice in London, Kentucky. He later moved to Glendale, California, in 1910 and continued to practice law and banking.

He was the city attorney of Glendale from 1911 to 1921 and a delegate to the Republican National Convention in 1924.

=== Congress ===
Evans was elected as a Republican to the Seventieth and to the three succeeding Congresses (March 4, 1927 – January 3, 1935), and an unsuccessful candidate for re-election in 1934 to the Seventy-fourth Congress. In Congress he served on the House Naval Affairs Committee and the House Ways and Means Committee.

Evans supported the Boulder (Hoover) Dam, voted against the repeal of Prohibition (the 21st Amendment) in Congress, and sought to prevent water taxis launching to gambling ships anchored offshore.

=== Later career and death ===
Later in life, Evans resumed the practice of law, real estate development, and ranching until his death in Los Angeles, California, November 12, 1959. He is interred at Forest Lawn Cemetery in Glendale.

== Electoral history ==
United States House of Representatives elections, 1926
Party	Candidate	Votes	%
Republican	William E. Evans (incumbent)	102,270	59.5
Prohibition	Charles Hiram Randall	61,719	35.9
Socialist	Charles F. Conley	7,943	4.6
Total votes		171,932	100.0
Turnout			
Republican hold			

United States House of Representatives elections, 1928
Party	Candidate	Votes	%
Republican	William E. Evans (incumbent)	222,261	77.0
Democratic	James B. Ogg	58,263	20.2
Socialist	Christian Sorenson	8,090	2.8
Total votes		288,614	100.0
Turnout			
Republican hold			

United States House of Representatives elections, 1930
Party	Candidate	Votes	%
Republican	William E. Evans (incumbent)	182,176	100.0
Turnout			
Republican hold			

1932 United States House of Representatives elections in California
Party	Candidate	Votes	%
Republican	William E. Evans (Incumbent)	57,739	51.8
Democratic	Albert D. Hadley	38,240	34.3
Liberty	Marshall V. Hartranft	15,520	13.9
Total votes		111,499	100.0
Turnout			
Republican hold			

1934 United States House of Representatives elections in California
Party	Candidate	Votes	%
Democratic	John S. McGroarty	66,999	53.5
Republican	William E. Evans (Incumbent)	56,350	45.0
Socialist	William E. Stephenson	1,814	1.5
Total votes		125,163	100.0
Turnout			
Democratic gain from Republican			

== See also ==
- California's congressional delegations

U.S. House of Representatives
Preceded by Walter F. Lineberger	Member of the U.S. House of Representatives from California's 9th congressional district 1927–1933	Succeeded by Denver S. Church
Preceded by Philip D. Swing	Member of the U.S. House of Representatives from California's 11th congressional district 1933–1935	Succeeded by John S. McGroarty
