= Frank M. Jordan =

American politician (1888–1970)

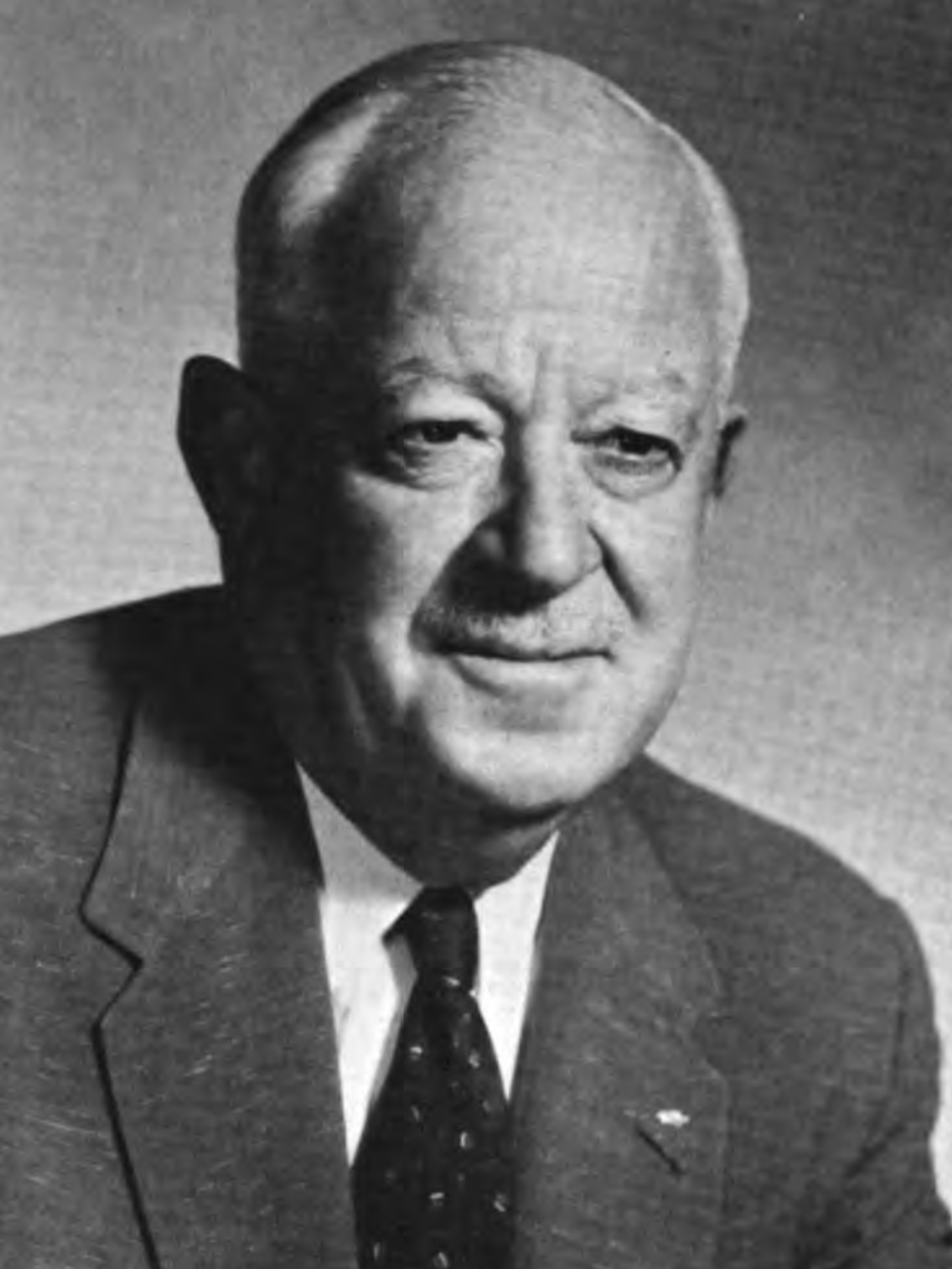
- Official portrait, 1967

22nd Secretary of State of California
- In office January 4, 1943 – March 29, 1970
- Governor: Earl Warren; Goodwin Knight; Pat Brown; Ronald Reagan
- Preceded by: Paul Peek
- Succeeded by: H. P. Sullivan

Personal details
- Born: Frank Morrill Jordan; August 6, 1888 Alameda, California, U.S.
- Died: March 30, 1970 (aged 81) Sacramento, California, U.S.
- Party: Republican
- Spouse(s): Alice Crossan, Alberta Sturtzman
- Parent: Frank C. Jordan

Military service
- Allegiance: United States
- Branch/service: United States Army
- Battles/wars: World War I

Frank Morrill Jordan (August 6, 1888 – March 30, 1970) was the 22nd Secretary of State of California. He was the son of Frank Chester Jordan, California's Secretary of State from 1911 to 1940. When the younger Jordan defeated interim appointee Paul Peek in 1942, he became the first man in the history of California to be elected to succeed his father in a state constitutional office. His early death in office is notable for indirectly launching the career of Jerry Brown.

A veteran of the First World War, Jordan held an early job with the Automobile Association of California and ran his own general insurance agency before joining his father's staff.

After delayed returns in the 1960 presidential election due to hand counting, Jordan championed legislation requiring mandatory use of voting machines. In 1964, he proposed statewide vote-by-mail, but this was not adopted. Jordan's efforts to mandate machine counting spurred development in computing systems in what became Silicon Valley.

Jordan's early death in March 1970 created a vacancy to be filled by then-Governor Ronald Reagan, who believed it was unfair to appoint someone to the office and give that person a leg up in the November 1970 election. Therefore Reagan appointed a lower-level staff member, H.P. Sullivan, on an interim basis to fill the vacancy so that two Republicans could compete in the primary without the advantage of incumbency. The Republican primary was won by James L. Flournoy, an African-American Los Angeles attorney; this made Flournoy the first African-American nominated for statewide office in California by a major party. Flournoy lost the general election to Democrat Jerry Brown, who went on to serve as state attorney general and four terms as governor of California.

Political offices
Preceded by Paul Peek	California Secretary of State; 1943–1970	Succeeded by H. P. Sullivan
