= Chief Clerk of the California State Assembly =

The Chief Clerk of the California Assembly is a nonpartisan elected officer of the California State Assembly. The Chief Clerk serves as the chief parliamentarian of the 80-member house. The clerk is also charged with maintaining the records and votes of the Assembly, engrossing and enrolling bills, providing members with analyses of bills on third reading, amending legislation, and publishing the bills, journals, files, and histories of the lower house.

Historically, persons who have served as Chief Clerk have possessed an advanced degree when they were elected (e.g., M.A. or J.D.). ^{1}

In California, three officers are elected every two years when the Assembly organizes: Chief Clerk, Chief Sergeant-at-Arms, and Chaplain. These officers are not members of the house and serve the legislature in a nonpartisan capacity.

The current Chief Clerk is Sue Parker, first woman to hold the position, who was first elected in 2020.

This is a list of Chief Clerks of the California Assembly.

To keep the numbering system correct, there are instances where a clerk has had a hiatus between terms of service (e.g. J.M. Anderson is the sixth person to serve as Chief Clerk: he served 1855–56, had a four-year hiatus, and then returned from 1860–61). Therefore, the numbering of Chief Clerks in column one fluctuates based upon the fact that some clerks served previously. Their original "clerk number" is retained on the left with an asterisk to indicate why it is out of numeric sequence.

- For information about the Assembly, see California State Assembly.
- For a list of all members of the Assembly see Members of the California State Legislature

Chief Clerk	Term of Service
1. E.H. Tharp	1849–1850 (resigned)^{2}
2. John Nugent	1850
3. George O. McMullin	1851
4. Blantin McAlpin	1852–1853 (resigned)^{3}
5. J.G. Stebbins	1853
4.* Blanton McAlpin	1854 *(previously served 1852–53)
6. J.M. Anderson	1855–1856
7. William Campbell	1857
8. Joseph W. Scoby	1858
9. Caleb Gilman	1859
6.* J.M. Anderson	1860–1861 *(previously served 1855–56)
10. John Sedgwick	1862
11. H.G. Worthington	1863
12. Osgood C. Wheeler	1864
13. Marcus D. Boruck	1866
14. John A. Eagon	1868
15. Robert Ferral	1870
13.* Marcus D. Boruck	1872 *(previously served 1866)
16. D.L. Loafborrow	1874
15.* Robert Ferral	1876 *(previously served 1870)
17. Robert C. Page	1878
18. C.E. Gunn	1880
19. George E. McStay	1881
20. M.C. Haley	1883
21. Frank D. Ryan	1885–1888
22. Edward E. Leake	1889
23. H.A. Mason	1891
24. George W. Peckham	1893
25. S.J. Duckworth	1895–1898
26. C.W. Kyle	1899
27. Clio Lloyd	1901–1909
28. L.B. Mallory	1911–1916
29. B.O. Boothby	1917–1920
30. Jerome B. Kavanaugh	1921
31. Arthur Ohnimus	1923–1937
32. James G. Smyth	1937–1939
33. Jack Carl Greenburg	1939–1941
31.* Arthur Ohnimus	1941–1963 ^{4} (previously served 1923–1937) Note: Longest serving clerk in history: 37 years
34. James D. Driscoll	1963–1986
35. R. Brian Kidney	1987–1991
36. Lawrence A. Murman	1991 (acting clerk)
37. E. Dotson Wilson	1992–2019
38. Sue Parker	2020–Present

- ^1 For example: Arthur Ohnimus (J.D., St. Ignatius), James Driscoll (M.A., Claremont College) and R. Brian Kidney (M.A., University of San Francisco). Several years after he was elected Clerk, Driscoll earned a J.D. from McGeorge School of Law.
- ^2 Resigned February 1, 1850.
- ^3 Resigned February 15, 1853.
- ^4 Retired October 4, 1963.
