= Clio Lloyd =

American newspaper publisher

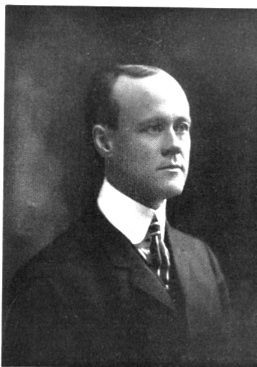

27th Chief Clerk of California Assembly
- In office January 8, 1901 – September 1910
- Preceded by: C.W. Kyle
- Succeeded by: Thomas G. Walker

Personal details
- Born: April 1864 Mercer County, Illinois, United States
- Died: February 6, 1921 (aged 56) California, United States
- Profession: Newspaper publisher

Clio Lloyd (April 1864 – February 6, 1921) was an American politician and newspaper publisher who was the 27th Chief Clerk of the California Assembly from 1901 to 1910.

== Biography ==
Lloyd was born in Mercer County, Illinois. He was educated in public schools and private college. Lloyd took up teaching as a profession for 8 years, until he went into the newspaper publishing and real estate businesses in Santa Barbara County, California. In 1893, he was chosen as a Commissioner from Southern California to the World's Columbian Exposition in Chicago. In December 1905 he was elected to a four-year term as a member of the Santa Barbara Board of Education. In the early 1900s, he was publisher of the Santa Barbara Daily Press. He was also Director of the Press Publishing Company in Santa Barbara.

Lloyd served as clerk when party patronage was still widely practiced in California government. During his terms as clerk, Lloyd served under four Republican Speakers of the Assembly: Arthur G. Fisk, Frank C. Prescott, Robert L. Beardslee Sr., and Philip A. Stanton. Prior to the professionalization of the Chief Clerk's office by longtime Chief Clerk Arthur Ohnimus, clerks were often majority party loyalists. To this end, Lloyd was active in Southern California Republican politics. He was Vice President of the League of Southern California Republican Clubs and Secretary of the Santa Barbara County Republican Central Committee. He was a member of the Independent Order of the Odd Fellows and the Benevolent Protective Order of Elks.

Lloyd served as Chief Clerk from 1901-1910—at the time, this was the longest anyone had served as Chief Clerk. He was the second person in California history to serve more than two consecutive terms as Chief Clerk, the first being Blanton McAlpin who was elected as Chief Clerk in the Assembly's Third Legislative Session in 1852 and again in the Fourth Session in 1853. When Governor James Gillett called the Legislature into a brief Second Special Session in October 1910, Lloyd did not run for re-election.

== Sources ==
- The Government of the State of California 1903," Published by Fred Coleman, Sacramento: 1903.
- Journals of the Assembly, California Legislature, 1901, 1903, 1905, 1907, 1909, 1910 (1st Extraordinary Session). View Assembly Journal archives online at http://www.assembly.ca.gov/clerk -click on "Assembly Journals"
- California's Legislature (2006 edition). E. Dotson Wilson, California State Assembly.
- California Blue Book, 1903 Office of State Printing: Sacramento, CA.
