= 1938 California Secretary of State election =

- November 8, 1938
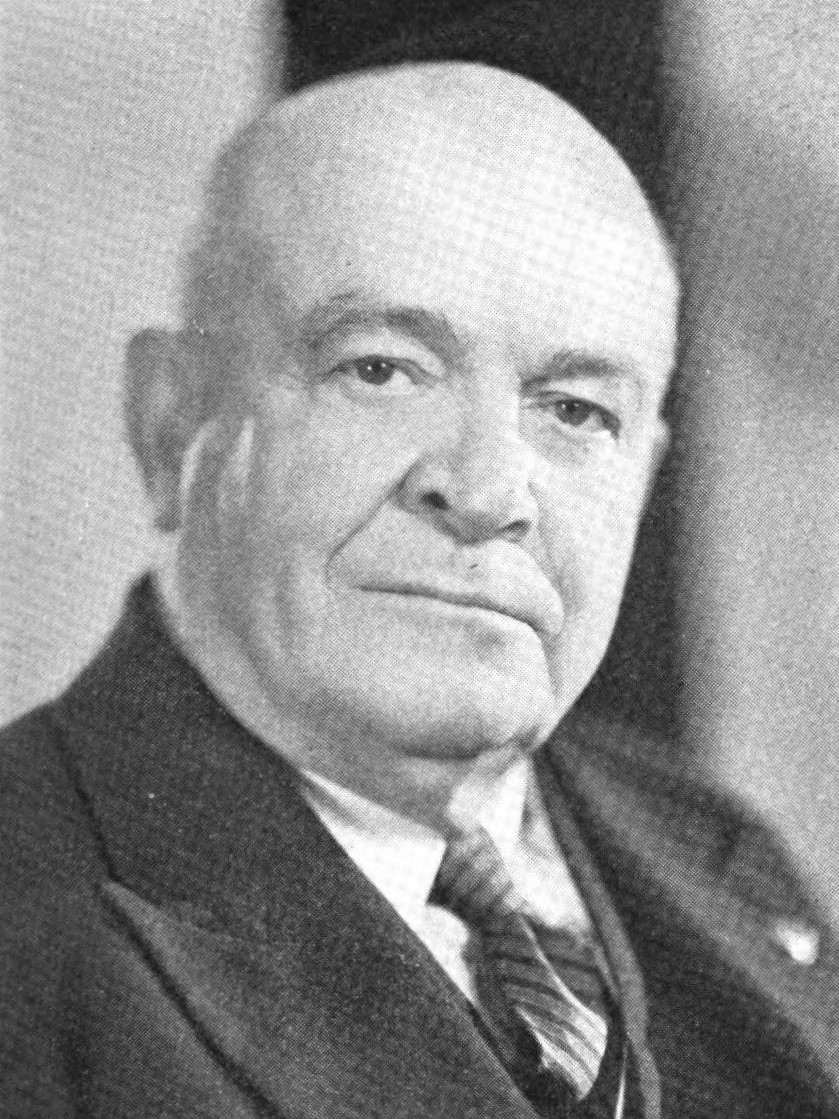

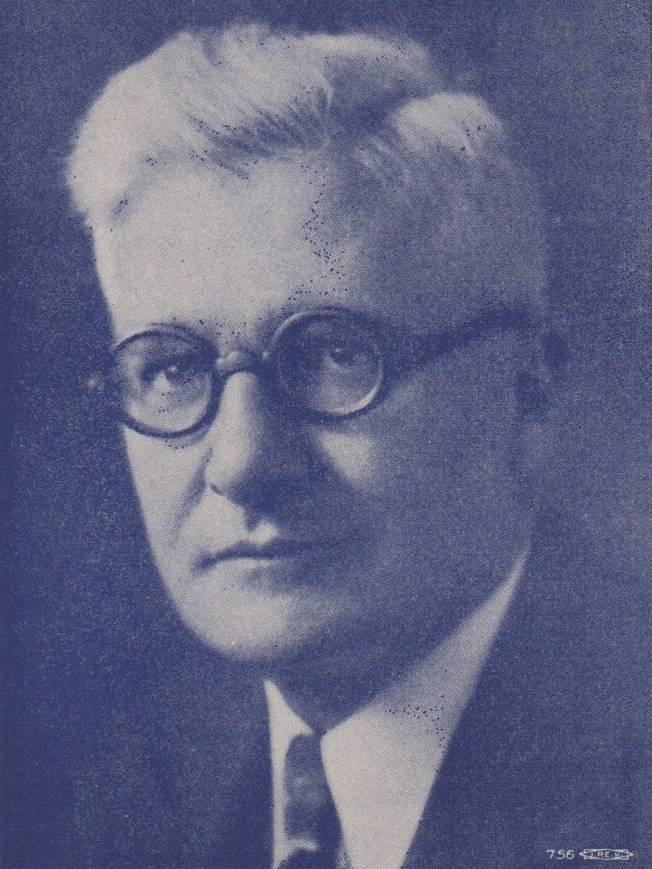
Nominee	Frank C. Jordan	Leo Gallagher
Party	Republican	Communist
Alliance	Democratic; Townsend
Popular vote	2,139,766	150,760
Percentage	90.34%	6.36%
- County results Jordan: 80–90% 90-100%
Secretary of State before election
Frank C. Jordan
Republican
Elected Secretary of State
Frank C. Jordan
Republican

The 1938 California Secretary of State election was held on November 8, 1938. Incumbent Republican Frank C. Jordan won both the Democratic and Republican primaries, and easily defeated Communist nominee Leo Gallagher and Prohibitionist nominee Nellie S. Harriss in the general election with 90.34% of the vote.

== Primary election results ==
Primary elections were held on August 30, 1938.

=== Candidates ===
- Frank C. Jordan (R), incumbent Secretary of State
- John S. McGroarty (D), U.S. Representative
- Leo Gallagher (D), ILD attorney
- Marye Shannon Harrington (D)
- Arthur A. Allen (D)
- Milton Bryan (D)
- Nellie S. Harriss (Prohibition)

=== Results ===
Republican primary results
Party	Candidate	Votes	%
Republican	Frank C. Jordan	606,828	100.00%
Total votes		606,828	100.00%

Democratic primary results
Party	Candidate	Votes	%
Republican	Frank C. Jordan	479,264	47.52%
Democratic	John S. McGroarty	211,856	21.01%
Democratic	Leo Gallagher	125,051	12.40%
Democratic	Marye Shannon Harrington	79,799	7.91%
Democratic	Arthur A. Allen	73,502	7.29%
Democratic	Milton Bryan	39,114	3.88%
Total votes		1,008,586	100.00%

Communist primary results
Party	Candidate	Votes	%
Communist	Leo Gallagher	755	100.00%
Total votes		755	100.00%

== General election ==
=== Candidates ===
Major party candidates

- Frank C. Jordan, Republican

Other candidates

- Leo Gallagher, Communist
- Nellie S. Harriss, Prohibition

=== Results ===
1938 California Secretary of State election
Party	Candidate	Votes	%	±%
Republican	Frank C. Jordan	2,139,766	90.34%	
Communist	Leo Gallagher	150,760	6.36%	
Prohibition	Nellie S. Harriss	77,076	3.25%	
	Scattering	1,017	0.04%	
Majority		1,989,006		
Total votes		2,368,619		
Republican hold		Swing		
