= H. P. Sullivan =

American politician

H.P. Sullivan
- Born: 1 July 1921; New York, New York, U.S.
- Died: May 1972
- Occupation: Secretary of State of California

Henry Patrick Sullivan was the Secretary of State of California from 1970 to 1971 after Frank M. Jordan died in office. Governor Ronald Reagan appointed Sullivan on the condition that he would not seek a full term in the 1970 primary; Reagan felt it was unfair for someone to have an advantage in the general election as an appointed incumbent.

Sullivan accepted the condition and was not a candidate for the full term. Jerry Brown was elected to succeed him.

Preceded by Frank M. Jordan	Secretary of State of California; 1970–1971	Succeeded by Jerry Brown
