= Raymond L. Sullivan =

American judge (1907–1999)

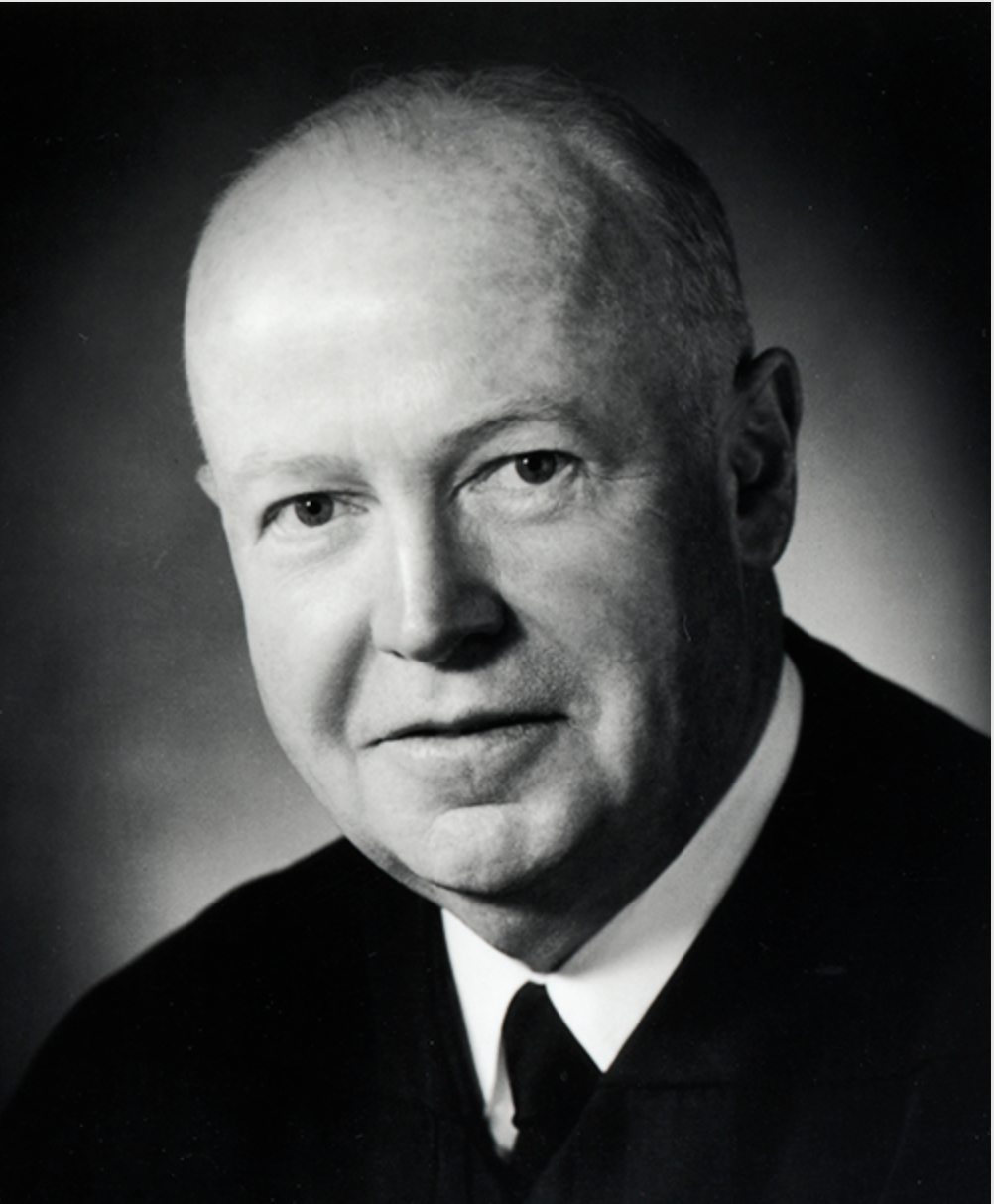

Associate Justice of the Supreme Court of California
- In office December 20, 1966 – January 19, 1977
- Appointed by: Governor Pat Brown
- Preceded by: Paul Peek
- Succeeded by: Wiley W. Manuel

Presiding Justice of the California Courts of Appeal, First District
- In office 1964 – December 19, 1966

Associate Justice of the California Courts of Appeal, First District
- In office 1961–1964

Personal details
- Born: January 23, 1907 San Francisco, California, U.S.
- Died: October 20, 1999 (aged 92) San Francisco, California, U.S.
- Spouse: Winifred F. Carreras
- Education: University of San Francisco (BA, JD, LLM)

Raymond Lawrence Sullivan (January 23, 1907 – October 20, 1999) was an associate justice of the Supreme Court of California from December 20, 1966, to January 19, 1977.

== Biography ==
Born in San Francisco, California, the son of Frank Harrold Sullivan (1887-1948) and Florence Mary Smith (1881-1942), Raymond attended public schools until 1920, and graduated from St. Ignatius High School in 1924. He was educated at St. Ignatius College, which in 1930 was renamed the University of San Francisco, receiving his A.B. magna cum laude in 1928. He continued his studies and was awarded his J.D. in 1930, graduating first in his class, and LL.M. in 1933.

After graduation, Sullivan entered private practice by forming the firm of Malone and Sullivan, where he worked for the next 28 years. His law partner, William M. Malone, was also Chairman of the Democratic Party in California during much of the Roosevelt and Truman administrations.

Sullivan was named Associate Justice of the Court of Appeal, First Appellate District, Division One, 1961 – 1964, and was then the Presiding Justice from 1964 to 1966. On December 20, 1966, Sullivan was appointed by Governor Pat Brown the 88th justice of the Supreme Court, succeeding Justice Paul Peek, who retired.

Among Sullivan's notable cases are Serrano v. Priest (1971), in which he addressed the inequality of public school financing. He authored the opinion in Li v. Yellow Cab Co. (1975) that abolished the "contributory negligence" rule and replaced it with the "comparative negligence" rule, making it easier for injured people to collect compensation. He also wrote the court's opinion in Castro v. State (1970), which struck down a provision of the California Constitution that disenfranchised citizens who were literate in Spanish but not in the English language.

After stepping down from the bench on January 19, 1977, Sullivan taught for 15 years at the University of California, Hastings College of the Law, retiring in 1993.

== Honors and awards ==
In 1975, the California Trial Lawyers Association named him appellate judge of the year. The University of San Francisco bestowed on Sullivan an honorary LL.D. and the St. Thomas More Award. In 1998, the Alumni Association of the Law School presented him with the Distinguished Alumnus Award. The chair, Hon. Raymond L. Sullivan Professor of Law, at the UC Hastings College of Law is endowed in his honor.

== Personal life ==
Sullivan married Winifred F. Carreras (April 24, 1911 – April 14, 1997), a school teacher, and they had five children.

== See also ==
- List of justices of the Supreme Court of California

== Sources ==
- Tobriner, Mathew O. (March 31, 1977). "Justice Raymond L. Sullivan", California Law Review 65(2): 227–229.
- Cohen, Marsha N. (1994). "Justice Sullivan: The Teacher", 46 Hastings L.J. 3.

Legal offices
Preceded by Paul Peek	Associate Justice of the California Supreme Court; December 20, 1966 – 1977	Succeeded by Wiley Manuel
Preceded by	Presiding Justice of the California Court of Appeal; First District; 1964 – December 19, 1966	Succeeded by
Preceded by	Associate Justice of the California Court of Appeal; First District; 1961 – 1964	Succeeded by
