= James D. Driscoll =

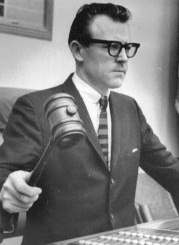

34th Chief Clerk of California Assembly
- In office 5 October 1963 – 30 December 1986
- Preceded by: Arthur Ohnimus
- Succeeded by: R. Brian Kidney

Personal details
- Died: August 18, 2003
- Party: Nonpartisan
- Profession: Legislative Officer

James Driscoll (1931-August 18, 2003) was the 34th Chief Clerk of California Assembly. Driscoll was the first Chief Clerk to serve the state's Assembly after the legislature became full-time in 1966. During his career as the nonpartisan clerk, he served under 4 Democratic and 1 Republican Speakers.

== Biography ==
James Driscoll was born in Glendale, California in 1931. He received his B.A. from Fresno State College. He completed his M.A. at Claremont Graduate University. While he was Chief Clerk, he attended McGeorge School of Law, where he later earned his J.D. while in office. Driscoll died in 2003.

Driscoll served as Chief Clerk from 1963 to 1986. He began his legislative career in 1957 in the first class of the Assembly Fellowship Program (at the time, it was simply called the "Legislative Internship Program" and was funded by the Ford Foundation). Driscoll was placed in the office of the Chief Clerk as an intern.

The following year, longtime Chief Clerk Arthur Ohnimus hired him as First Assistant Clerk; and in 1961, Ohnimus appointed Driscoll to be Chief Assistant Clerk.

When Ohnimus retired in 1963, Driscoll was appointed Chief Clerk by the Rules Committee. Driscoll was subsequently elected by the Assembly for the 1964 session and every session thereafter, until his retirement in 1986.

After California voters made the legislature full-time in November 1966, Driscoll published the book, California's Legislature, under the auspices of the Chief Clerk's office.
