= The Mission Play =

Pageant portraying the history of the California missions

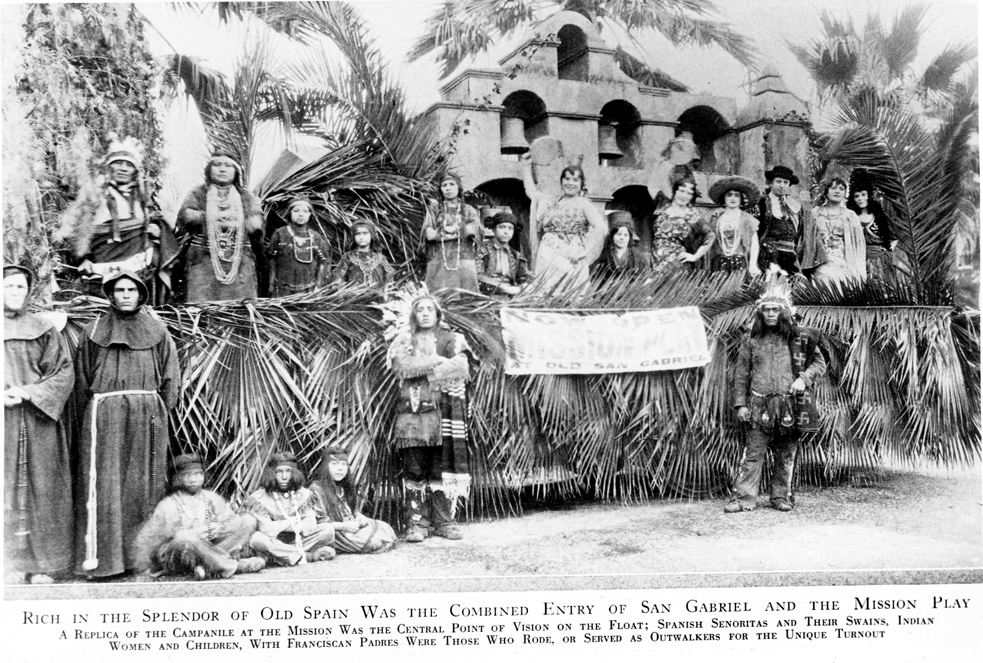
Mission Play float at the Tournament of Roses Parade, 1922

The Mission Play, by John S. McGroarty, was a three-hour pageant portraying the history of the California missions. Performed in San Gabriel, Ca, it was first staged in 1912 across from the San Gabriel Mission. In 1927 the San Gabriel Mission Playhouse was constructed to house the production. It was seen by over 2.5 million people.

== History ==
In 1902, reflecting an interest in Spanish California brought upon by the success of Helen Hunt Jackson's Ramona combined with population influx from new railroads connecting Southern California to the rest of the United States, Frank Augustus Miller changed the name of his father's 1876 hotel from the "Glenwood Hotel" to the "Mission Inn." He began building in a variety of styles including most prominently Mission Revival Style architecture. During the 30-year construction period Miller traveled the world, collecting treasures to bring back to the hotel for display. It was during this time he witnessed a German Passion Play, most likely the Oberammergau Passion Play, which became the basis for the Mission Play. Miller took McGroarty to Mount Rubidoux in Riverside where beneath "the shadow of the cross erected to the memory of Father Serra, the plan unfolded."

Along with McGroarty came investment from other Southern California deep-pocketed heavy-hitters, including railroad magnate and collector of art and rare books, Henry E. Huntington; the son-in-law of the owner and future publisher of the Los Angeles Times, Henry Chandler; and one of Southern California's first oil tycoons, Edward L. Doheny.
