= William M. Malone =

American politician

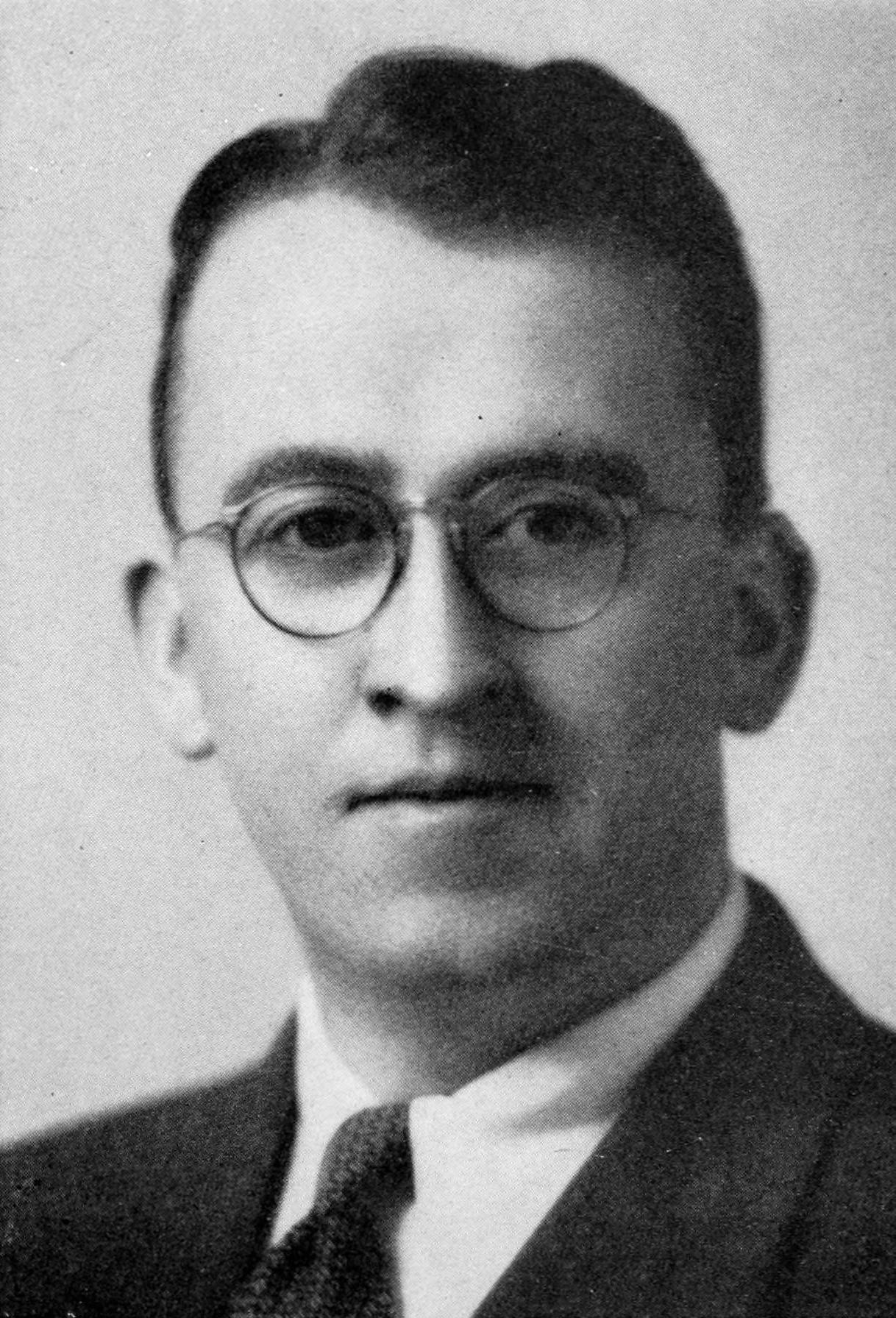
Malone c. 1940

William Matthew Malone (July 7, 1900 – December 6, 1981) was an American lawyer and political boss who chaired the California Democratic Party during and after World War II.

An attorney with a small personal injury law practice he shared with Raymond L. Sullivan, Malone was akin to a political "boss" whose influence extended throughout the state. He controlled most of the federal patronage appointments in the state until his friend President Harry Truman left office in 1953.

== Biography ==
Malone was born in San Francisco to Mary and William Malone. His father was an Irish immigrant. He earned a law degree at St. Ignatius College (later the University of San Francisco) in 1924.

Malone began his political career by allegiance to political "boss" Thomas Finn. A veteran California politician who was Under-Sheriff and then Sheriff of San Francisco from the time of the 1906 earthquake through the later years of Prohibition, Finn was the Republican political boss who had supplanted the Buckley and Ruef machines that dominated San Francisco municipal government after the turn of the century. Still in power in 1930, Finn was also the early political mentor of Arthur Samish, later the notorious liquor lobbyist whose enormous influence in the California Legislature of the 1940s led to a national political scandal.

Malone's rise to power as the Democratic counterpoint to Finn is still undocumented, but by 1940, he had consolidated his hold on the San Francisco Democratic Party organization, in partnership with labor leader John F. Shelley (later Congressman and Mayor of San Francisco), and was recognized by the Democratic National Committee in New Deal Washington as arbiter of the "Federal Brigade", those California Democratic stalwarts appointed to political patronage positions in a vast number of federal agencies.

Though colleagues believed his personal philosophy to be considerably more conservative than that of most liberal New Dealers, Malone rarely spoke about "issues". His interest was in dispensing patronage and winning elections to gain and maintain power and his campaign expertise was highly regarded by such liberal candidates as Helen Gahagan Douglas, the Democratic nominee for U.S. Senate in 1950 who was defeated with "red-baiting" tactics by Richard Nixon.

Malone's influence was already on the wane by 1952, when a new generation of liberals, inspired by the presidential candidacy of Adlai Stevenson, became active in Democratic politics. His reputation had been tarnished the year before by Senator Estes Kefauver's investigation into organized crime through much-publicized public hearings. Hardly on a par with the Mafia kingpins whom Kefauver's committee subpoenaed elsewhere in the country, a half dozen Malone associates (including James G. Smyth, the former State Assembly clerk and Democratic campaign manager whom Truman appointed, and then fired, as Collector of Internal Revenue for northern California) were called to account for alleged misdeeds. Malone's brother was implicated in the subsequent scandal, and Malone himself, embittered, soon resigned his formal Party position.

Having been a delegate to almost every Democratic National Convention since 1940, Malone attended his last in 1960, the Los Angeles Convention that nominated John F. Kennedy. Malone was himself very enthusiastic about Kennedy's candidacy, though he reluctantly recognized that a Democratic changing of the guard was in progress. In his own San Francisco, this turnover was led by the coterie that surrounded stridently liberal Assemblyman Phillip Burton, Malone's long-time enemy, who succeeded Malone's friend John Shelley as the city's Democratic Congressman when Shelley became Mayor in 1964.

Malone's influence was still felt in 1968, when he backed Joseph Alioto's winning bid to succeed the sickly Shelley as Mayor, a blow to the so-called "Burton Machine" which had been grooming a candidate of its own. Later that year, Alioto delivered the nominating speech at the Democratic National Convention for presidential nominee Hubert Humphrey, who was also strongly supported by Malone at a time of deep division among Democrats over the Vietnam War that led to Humphrey's defeat by Richard Nixon.
