= Paul Peek (politician) =

American judge and politician (1904-1987)

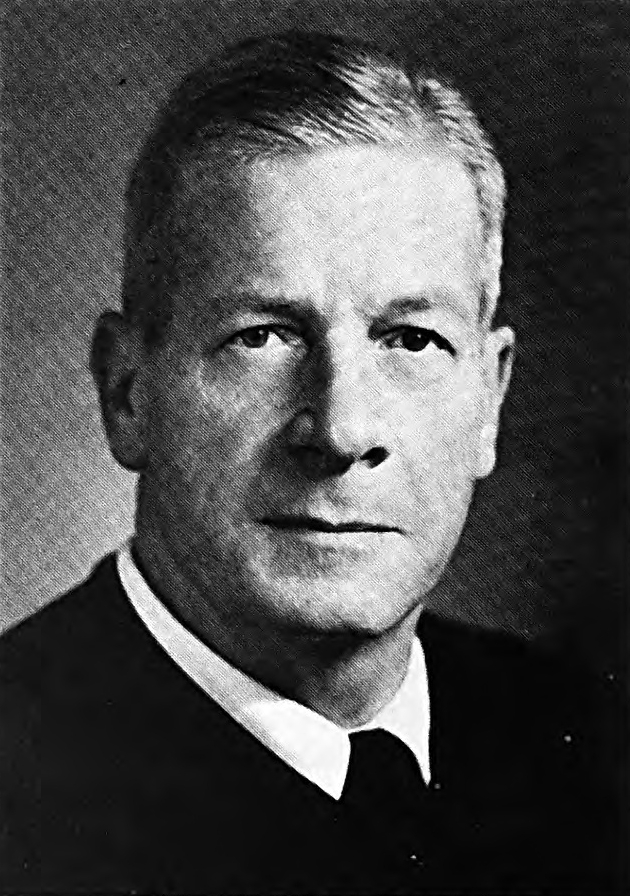
- Official portrait, 1963

Associate Justice of the California Supreme Court
- In office December 2, 1962 – December 16, 1966
- Appointed by: Pat Brown
- Preceded by: Thomas P. White
- Succeeded by: Raymond L. Sullivan

Presiding Justice of the California Third District Court of Appeal
- In office October 1961 – December 2, 1962
- Preceded by: Benjamin F. Van Dyke
- Succeeded by: Fred R. Pierce

Associate Justice of the California Third District Court of Appeal
- In office January 4, 1943 – October 1961
- Appointed by: Culbert Olson
- Preceded by: Raglan Tuttle
- Succeeded by: Fred R. Pierce

21st California Secretary of State
- In office March 1, 1940 – January 4, 1943
- Governor: Culbert Olson
- Preceded by: Frank C. Jordan
- Succeeded by: Frank M. Jordan

Chairman of the California Democratic Party
- In office April 8, 1939 – September 20, 1940
- Preceded by: John Gee Clark
- Succeeded by: William M. Malone

47th Speaker of the California State Assembly
- In office January 2, 1939 – June 20, 1939
- Preceded by: William Moseley Jones
- Succeeded by: Gordon Hickman Garland

Member of the California State Assembly from the 71st district
- In office January 4, 1937 – March 1, 1940
- Preceded by: Harry B. Riley
- Succeeded by: Frederick N. Howser

Personal details
- Born: William Paul Peek; June 5, 1904 West Union, Iowa, U.S.
- Died: April 7, 1987 (aged 82) Sacramento, California, U.S.
- Party: Democratic
- Spouse: Elizabeth Nash (m. 1930)
- Children: 2
- Occupation: Attorney

William Paul Peek (June 5, 1904 – April 7, 1987) was an American attorney, Democratic politician and jurist. Peek practiced law in southern California prior to his election in 1936 to the California Assembly, where he served as Speaker during the 1939 session. He was appointed Secretary of State in 1940 and then to the Court of Appeal, in December 1942, where he served for 20 years. In 1962, Governor Pat Brown appointed Peek to the California Supreme Court. Justice Peek retired from the bench in 1966, but continued to work as a consulting attorney and teacher. He died in Sacramento.

== Biography ==
=== Early years ===
Born in West Union, Iowa, the son of William M. Peek, he moved to California at age 6. He attended Oregon State University and the University of Oregon before obtaining his legal education at Southwestern University School of Law in Los Angeles. He married Elizabeth Nash in 1930.

Peek was admitted to the State Bar of California in 1930. He practiced law in Long Beach and Los Angeles and was a member of the Long Beach Junior Chamber of Commerce (president, 1935) and the State Junior Chamber of Commerce (vice-president, 1936).

=== Career ===
In 1936, Peek was elected to the California State Assembly from the 71st district, in Los Angeles County, where he served until 1940. He worked with Senator Culbert Olson to oppose legislation sponsored by the administration of Republican Governor Frank Merriam to treat oil on state lands in Long Beach and Huntington Beach in a manner favored by the oil industry. "It looks very much like we're turning the oil pool over to private interests lock, stock and barrel," Peek said.

At the start of his second term in the State Assembly, the Democratic-majority State Assembly elected Peek as Speaker (replacing William Moseley Jones who hadn't sought reelection in 1938). Peek's candidacy was strongly supported by his friend and patron, Governor Culbert L. Olson. As Speaker, Peek promoted a variety of liberal policies to lessen the impact of the Depression on Californians. His close alliance with the Governor alienated a number of moderate and conservative Democrats, who allied themselves with Republicans to elect Gordon Hickman Garland as Speaker in 1940.

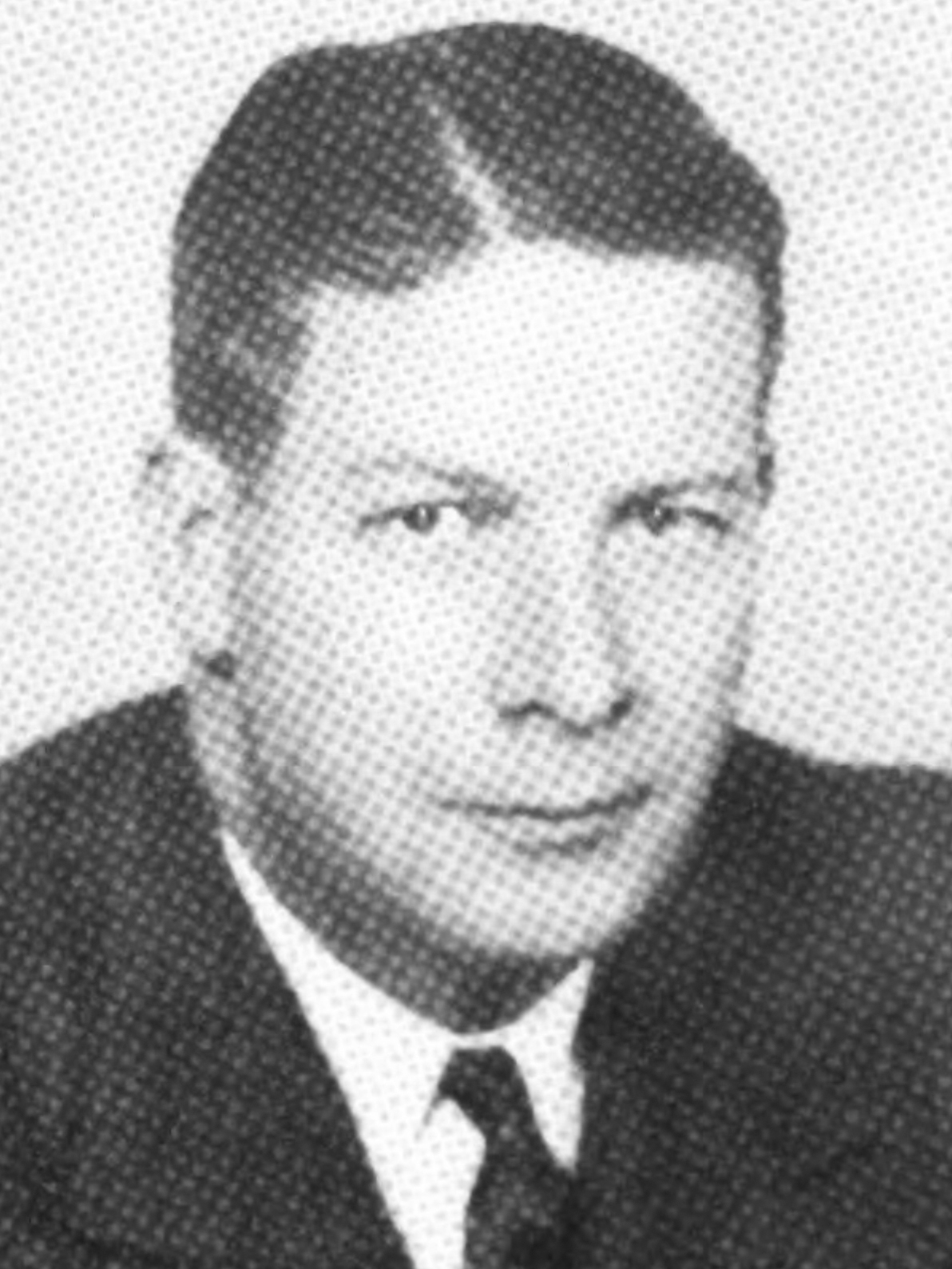
Peek as Secretary of State, 1942

Peek was appointed Secretary of State by Democratic Governor Culbert L. Olson in 1940, after the death of the long-time Republican incumbent, Frank C. Jordan. He did not win the general election in 1942, when Republican Frank M. Jordan won back the office that his father had held.

After Jordan won the 1942 election, Governor Olson appointed Peek to the California Court of Appeal's Third Appellate District in Sacramento. He served as associate justice from January 1943 to October 1961 and as Presiding Justice from October 1961 to December 1962.

Peek was the author of the 1951 appellate decision overturning California's loyalty oath. According to the Daily Bruin, the Court ruled that The Regents' action to require faculty members to sign an affirmation of non-membership in any subversive organization was a violation of the State Constitution and "That the pledge is the highest loyalty that can be demonstrated by any citizen, and that the exacting of any other test of loyalty would be antithetical to our fundamental concept of freedom.... [any other decision would] approve that which from the beginning of our government has been denounced as the most effective means by which one special brand of political or economic philosophy can entrench and perpetuate itself to the eventual exclusion of all others . . ." Any "more inclusive" test of loyalty would be the "forerunner of tyranny and oppression," the document added.

Peek was appointed Associate Justice of the California Supreme Court by Governor Pat Brown in 1962. He retired from the bench in 1966. After retiring from the Supreme Court, Peek practiced law in Sacramento, with the firm of Wilke & Fleury.

== Appointments, boards and memberships ==
- University of California Board of Regents, ex officio member, 1939 - 1940.
- Chairman, Democratic State Central Committee, 1939-40.
- Delegate to Democratic National Convention from California, 1940.
- Member, Judicial Council of California, 1946-50. Trustee, McGeorge School of Law, Sacramento.

== See also ==
- List of justices of the Supreme Court of California

Legal offices
Preceded by Thomas P. White	Associate Justice of the California Supreme Court; December 2, 1962 – December 16, 1966	Succeeded by Raymond L. Sullivan
Preceded by Benjamin F. Van Dyke	Presiding Justice of the California Court of Appeal; Third District; October 1961 – December 2, 1962	Succeeded by Fred R. Pierce
Preceded by Raglan Tuttle	Associate Justice of the California Court of Appeal; Third District; January 4, 1943 – October 1961	Succeeded by Fred R. Pierce
Political offices
Preceded by Frank C. Jordan	California Secretary of State; March 1, 1940 – January 4, 1943	Succeeded by Frank M. Jordan
Preceded by William Moseley Jones	Speaker of the California State Assembly; January 1939 – June 1939	Succeeded by Gordon Hickman Garland
Preceded by Harry B. Riley	California State Assemblyman; 71st District; January 4, 1937 – March 1, 1940	Succeeded by Frederick N. Howser
