= Abbie Carrington =

American operatic singer

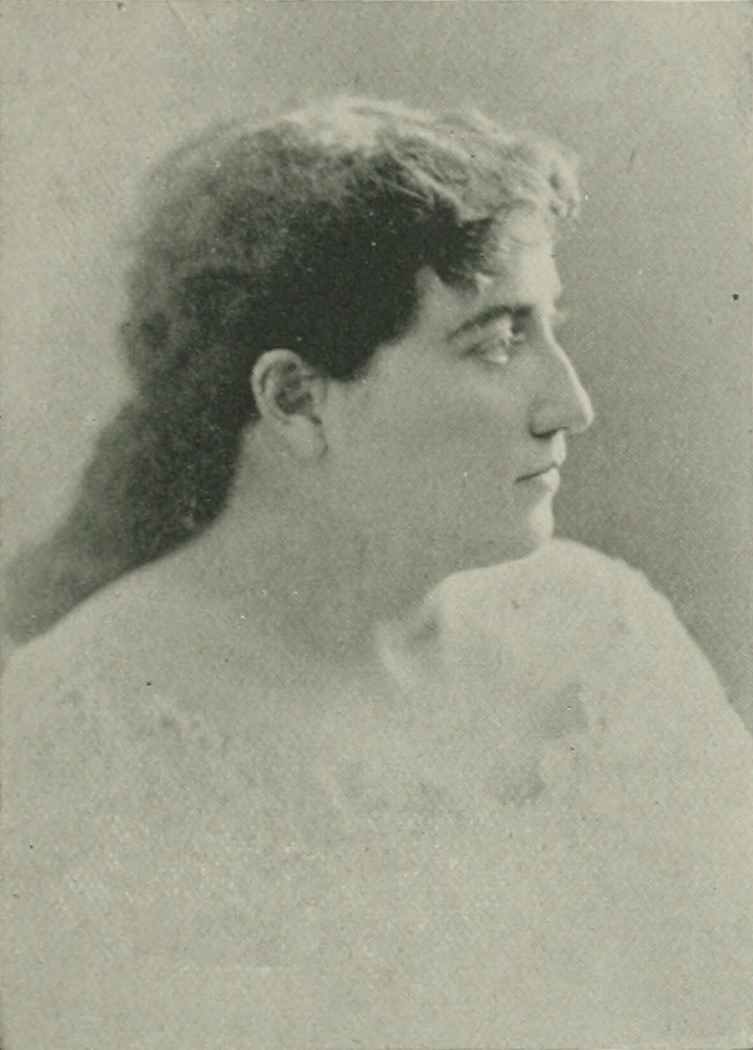
- Born: June 13, 1856; Fond du Lac, Wisconsin, U.S.
- Died: April 8, 1925 (aged 68); San Francisco, California, U.S.
- Occupation: Singer

Abbie Beeson Carrington Lewys (June 13, 1856 – April 8, 1925) was one of America's leading coloratura sopranos of the 19th century. When the Grand Opera House opened in Oshkosh, Wisconsin, for the first time on August 11, 1883, Carrington sang the title role in The Bohemian Girl.

== Early life and family ==
Abbie Beeson was born in Fond du Lac, Wisconsin, on June 13, 1856. She was the daughter of Edward Beeson (1815–1898), grandnephew of Henry Beeson, a Quaker who descended from English immigrants. Henry Beeson settled in Fayette County, Pennsylvania, founding Beesontown (later Uniontown, Pennsylvania). Henry and his wife Mary Beeson had 13 children, among whom John Beeson, Edward's father. John Beeson went to Ohio around 1802. When John Beeson had financial difficulties, he sent his children to live with relatives and friends. Edward returned home in 1829 and started an apprenticeship in Beaver, Pennsylvania to be a printer. He eventually bought the business and published the Beaver Republican, a paper with Democratic tendencies, supportive of Andrew Jackson. He also owned a sawmill at Green Bay, Wisconsin and after selling it, he bought a farm and settled in Wisconsin. Edward Beeson married Susan Emily Bell and had five children, among whom there was Abbie Beeson Carrington. Edward Beeson bought the Fond du Lac Journal, eventually becoming its editor and publisher. His son John founded the Fond du Lac Saturday Reporter. He died on December 16, 1898, in Fond du Lac.

== Career ==
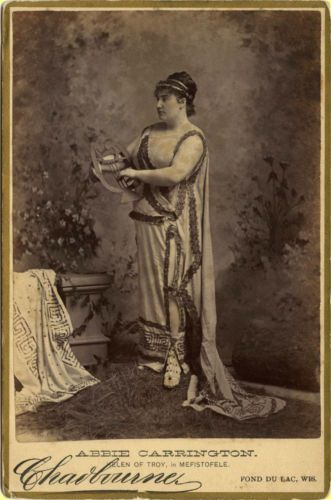
Abbie Carrington

Abbie Beeson's musical talents showed themselves at an early age. In September 1875, she went to Boston and studied under J. H. Wheeler and Eben Tourjée, meanwhile singing in Temple street church. In 1887 she was graduated from the New England Conservatory. She then went to Italy, where she began the study of opera under Perenini and Giovanni, and after one year of study she made her debut in Milan, in La Traviata. In Cervia and Ravenna she won a triumph as Gilda Rigoletto. Subsequently, she sang in Dinorah and Lucia di Lammermoor. She was next engaged for a season of two months in Turin and for one month in Brescia; then she went to Venice to sing during the Carnival season.

In 1879 she returned to the United States and sang in Milwaukee in April with the Mendelssohn Quartet Club. On October 7, 1879, in Boston, she sang with the Stakosch Opera Company. She next appeared in New York City with Theodore Thomas and the Philharmonic Society at the Steinway Hall. In January 1879, she made a tour of the main American cities, supported again by the Mendelssohn Quartet Club of Boston. In 1880–81 she made her first operatic tour with the C. D. Hess Grand Opera Company (also known as Strakosh-Hess Opera Company). In 1881–82 she was reengaged by Mr. Strakosch to sing on alternate nights with Etelka Gerster and Marie Roze.

When the Grand Opera House opened in Oshkosh, Wisconsin, for the first time on August 11, 1883, Carrington sang the title role in The Bohemian Girl.

In 1883–84 Carrington visited Mexico and achieved so pronounced a success that in Vera Cruz, Orizaba, Pueblo, Monterey and the City of Mexico she received in writing the thanks of the municipality for the great pleasure she had given their people during her stay among them, and as a declaration of their esteem and appreciation made and presented her subscriptions to the amount of $31,000, to revisit them the following season with her own company.

Carrington returned to the United States early in April, and immediately sailed for Europe at the solicitation of Manager Ernest Gye, of Covent Garden Theater, London. While there she secured some of the excellent talent that supported her during the following season, commencing in Richmond, Virginia, going directly south and to Mexico.

During 1884/85 the Abbie Carrington Grand Opera Company proved to be one of the most successful of the organizations on the road. During 1885/86 Carrington reappeared in Italian opera with Her Majesty's Grand Opera Company. In 1887, after six consecutive seasons in grand opera, having sung the leading soprano roles in twenty different operas, Carrington took a much-needed rest, which resulted in opening a new sphere of work, and since that time she traveled only with her own company in concert and oratorio. The season of 1890–91, the most successful and extended of her career, was a tour of the Pacific Coast and British Columbia.

== Personal life ==
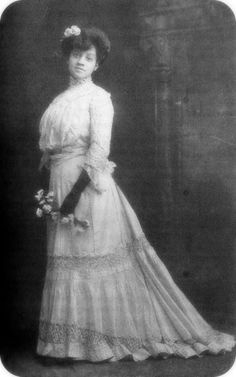
Abbie Carrington, 1898

In 1872 Abbie Beeson married Adelbert P. Carrington (1869–1902), a man from Fond du Lac, a tinsmith who worked with her brother, Henry, and had one daughter, Mary Carrington (b. 1874) who married firstly A.L. Miller and secondly Emlyn Lewys (the son of Abbie's second husband). In March 1899 Beeson filed for divorce for nonsupport and cruelty. She said she supported her husband for twenty-five years on the revenue which she derived from the exercise of her talents in the vocal line. In 1900 she married Prof. Wilbert Lewys, director of the Virgil Practice Clavier musical schools of London and Berlin.

Abbie Beeson Lewys died on April 8, 1925, in San Francisco, where she lived.
