= Jim Driscoll (American football) =

American football player and coach

Playing career
- 1960–1963: North Dakota State
- Position: Offensive lineman

Coaching career (HC unless noted)
- 1968: North Dakota (freshmen)
- 1969–1976: North Dakota State (assistant)
- 1978–1985: Northern Michigan (DB)
- 1988–1990: Mary
- 1991–1995: Northern Michigan (DC)
- 1997–1998: Marquette HS (MI)

Head coaching record
- Overall: 10–17 (college)

Jim Driscoll is a retired American football coach and former player. He is the former head football coach at the University of Mary in Bismarck, North Dakota, a position he had held from 1988 to 1990.

Driscoll's stint as the head coach at the University of Mary came in between two stints as a defensive coach at Northern Michigan University in Marquette, Michigan.
