= John S. McGroarty =

American poet (1862–1944)

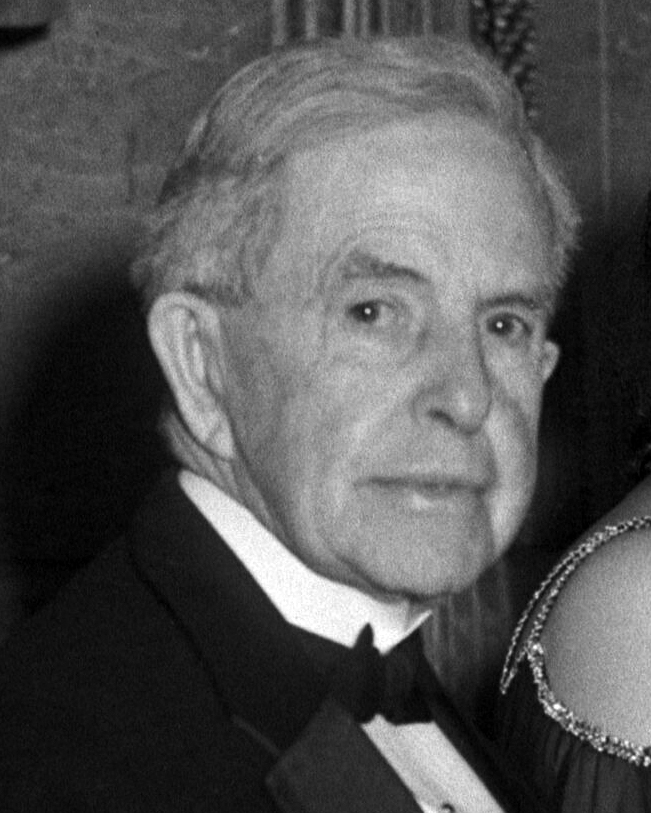
- McGroarty c. 1930

Member of the U.S. House of Representatives from California's 11th district
- In office January 3, 1935 – January 3, 1939
- Preceded by: William E. Evans
- Succeeded by: John Carl Hinshaw

Personal details
- Born: John Steven McGroarty; August 20, 1862 Luzerne County, Pennsylvania
- Died: August 7, 1944 (aged 81) Los Angeles, California
- Party: Democratic
- Profession: Politician, Journalist, Author, Poet

John Steven McGroarty (August 20, 1862 – August 7, 1944) was a poet, Los Angeles Times columnist, and author who also served two terms as a Democratic Congressman from California from 1935 to 1939.

== Biography ==
Born at Buck Mountain, in Foster Township, Luzerne County, Pennsylvania (near Wilkes-Barre), McGroarty was the youngest of 12 children. He was educated at public schools and Harry Hillman Academy in Wilkes-Barre, and was employed as treasurer of Luzerne County from 1890 to 1893. He later studied law and was admitted to the bar in 1894. He practiced in Wilkes-Barre.

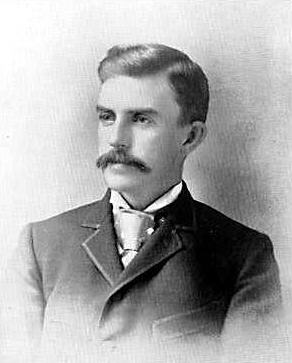
McGroarty in 1893

McGroarty moved to Montana and held an executive position with the Anaconda Copper Mining Company at Butte and Anaconda from 1896 to 1901.

=== Journalism ===
Afterward, he moved to Los Angeles, California in 1901 and worked as a journalist. In 1909, McGroarty edited a Los Angeles Times centenary edition of Lincoln's birth with an introspective on black people in Los Angeles. He became a "beloved figure in black Los Angeles" for his broad-minded views.

McGroarty authored numerous books and dramas, one of his best-known works being The Mission Play (1911), a three-hour pageant describing the California Missions from their founding in 1769 through secularization in 1834, ending with their "final ruin" in 1847. The play opened on April 29, 1912. McGroarty also penned California: Its History and Romance in 1911 and Mission Memories in 1929. In his book the California Plutarch, 1935, he detailed the lives and histories of Northern and Southern California's early pioneers such as the Crocker, Carrillo, Van Nuys, Stanford, Avila, Estrada, Sepulveda, Baldwin and Mulholland families. Besides, he was also the long-time editor of West Coast Magazine.

McGroarty was designated poet laureate of California by the state legislature in 1933.

=== Political career ===
He served in the 74th Congress from January 3, 1935, to January 3, 1937, where he played a significant role in introducing the Townsend Bill to the legislature. McGroarty was reelected to the 75th Congress from January 3, 1937, to January 3, 1939. In 1937, he introduced a successful bill that enabled the federal government to purchase a large timber holding from the Yosemite Lumber Company, bringing the land within the boundaries of Yosemite National Park. He worked on old age pension reform, and opposed President Roosevelt on the question of expanding the Supreme Court.

In 1938 McGroarty left his seat to run for California Secretary of State; he was defeated in the Democratic primary by incumbent Republican Frank C. Jordan. After his brief stint in politics, McGroarty resumed the profession of journalism in Tujunga, California.

=== Death and legacy ===
McGroarty died in St. Vincent's Hospital in Los Angeles, California on August 7, 1944, at the age of 81, and was interred at Calvary Cemetery.

He lived in Tujunga, California, in a house known as Chupa Rosa, that he built himself and completed in 1923 in what was at the time the unincorporated community of Sunland. It became a part of the City of Los Angeles in 1932. The building, located at 7570 McGroarty Terrace, is now Historic Cultural Monument No. 63 of the City of Los Angeles and is known as the McGroarty Arts Center.

== Electoral history ==
1934 United States House of Representatives elections in California
Party	Candidate	Votes	%
Democratic	John S. McGroarty	66,999	53.5
Republican	William E. Evans (Incumbent)	56,350	45.0
Socialist	William E. Stephenson	1,814	1.5
Total votes		125,163	100.0
Turnout			
Democratic gain from Republican			

1936 United States House of Representatives elections in California
Party	Candidate	Votes	%
Democratic	John S. McGroarty (Incumbent)	69,679	50.5
Republican	John Carl Hinshaw	54,914	39.8
Progressive Party (US, 1924)	Robert S. Funk	12,340	8.9
Communist	William Ingham	1,041	0.8
Total votes		137,974	100.0
Turnout			
Democratic hold			

1938 California Secretary of State Democratic primary election
Party	Candidate	Votes	%
Republican	Frank C. Jordan	479,264	47.52%
Democratic	John S. McGroarty	211,856	21.01%
Democratic	Leo Gallagher	125,051	12.40%
Democratic	Marye Shannon Harrington	79,799	7.91%
Democratic	Arthur A. Allen	73,502	7.29%
Democratic	Milton Bryan	39,114	3.88%
Total votes		1,008,586	100.00%

== Quotes ==
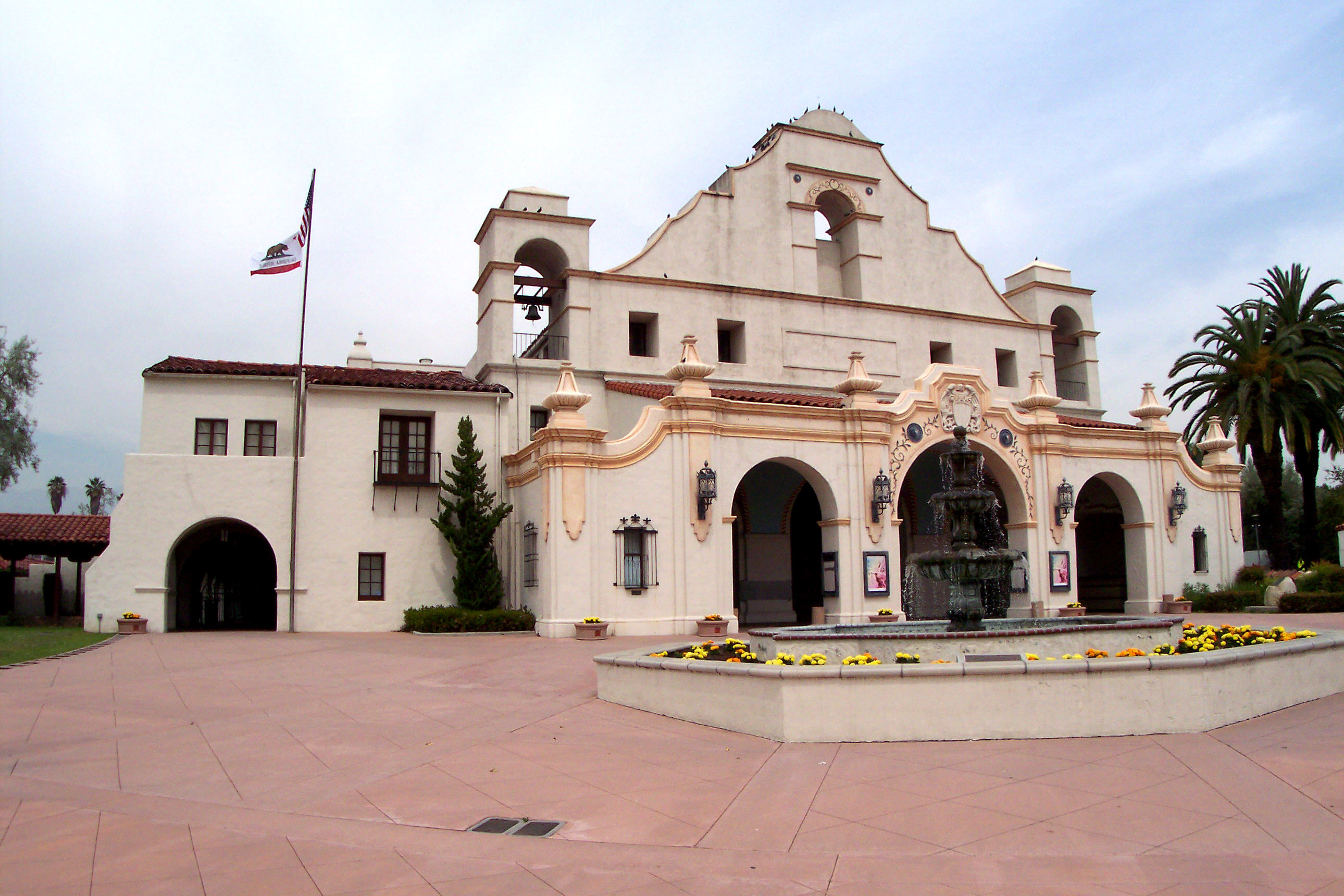
The San Gabriel Mission Playhouse, a classic example of "Mission Revival Style architecture," was built in 1927 as the "Mission Playhouse" specifically as a venue for McGroarty's production of The Mission Play, which chronicled the history of California. A statue of him sits in the theatre's lobby.

- "The plays could be made most touching and instructive at the same time, without connecting the Fathers in an unholy way with everlasting, silly femininity, as some would-be poets have done with no foundation in fact, but merely as a manifestation of their own unclean dreams, Godspeed to your work in that line."
  — Father Zephyrin Engelhardt to John S. McGroarty regarding his work on The Mission Play, 1910.
- "The story of Junipero Serra and the Missions for dramatic purposes has been lying around since 1833, at least, for anybody to grab. But no one grabbed it until I did so in 1912. Now it is mine."
  — John McGroarty to Charles F. Lummis regarding The Mission Play, 1916.
- "Both as Business and Art, it is intolerable to have in your beautiful pageant some of the frightful anachronisms now there. The Babbits don’t realize them; but every once in a great while someone will go to see the Mission Play who will know that Father Serra didn’t teach the California Indians to weave dam [sic] bad Navajo blankets!"
  — Charles F. Lummis to John McGroarty regarding The Mission Play, 1926.
- "One of the countless drawbacks of being in Congress is that I am compelled to receive impertinent letters from a jackass like you in which you say I promised to have the Sierra Madre mountains reforested and I have been in Congress two months and haven't done it. Will you please take two running jumps and go to hell."
  — Letter from John McGroarty to a constituent in 1934. Quoted by President John F. Kennedy in Profiles in Courage, 1956.

== See also ==
- California's congressional delegations
- M.V. Hartranft, speaker at the dedication of Mount McGroarty

== Notes ==
U.S. House of Representatives
Preceded by William E. Evans	Member of the U.S. House of Representatives from California's 11th congressional district 1935–1939	Succeeded by John Carl Hinshaw
