= Frank C. Jordan =

American politician (1860–1940)

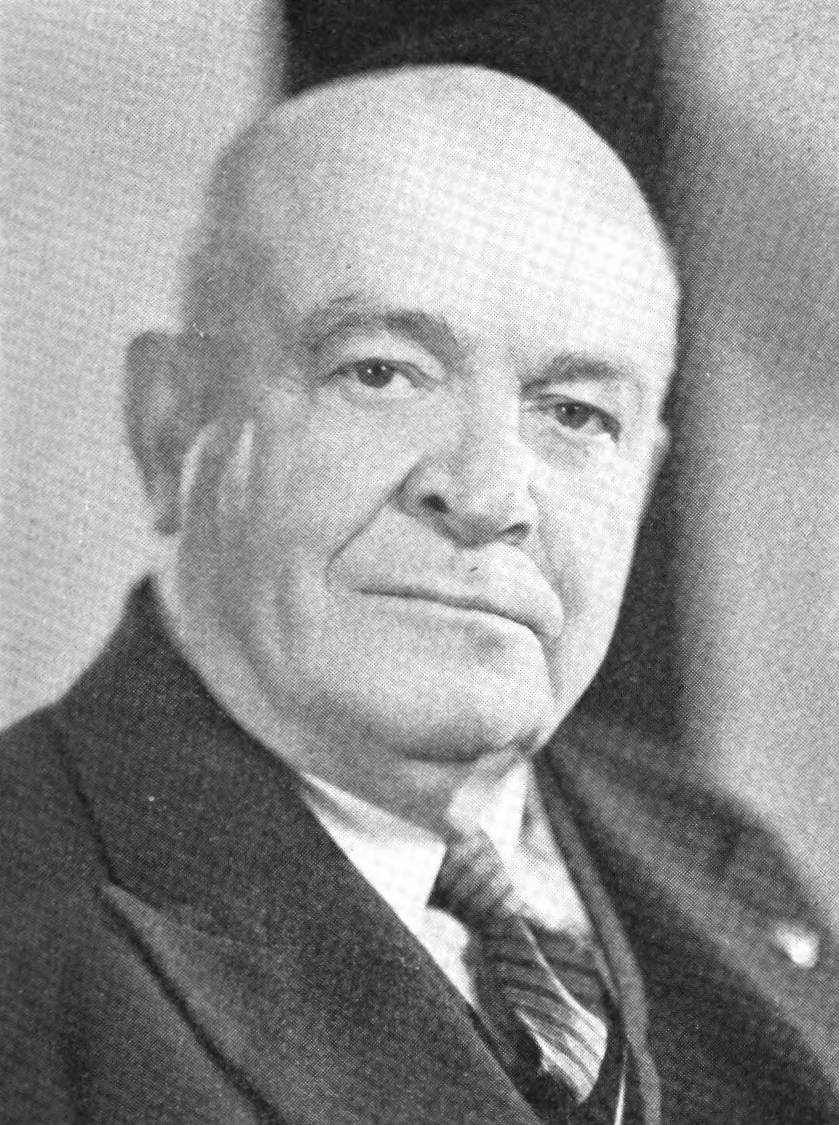
- Official portrait, 1932

20th Secretary of State of California
- In office January 3, 1911 – January 18, 1940
- Governor: Hiram Johnson; William Stephens; Friend Richardson; C. C. Young; James Rolph; Frank Merriam; Culbert Olson
- Preceded by: Charles F. Curry
- Succeeded by: Paul Peek

Clerk of the Supreme Court of California
- In office 1903–1907

Alameda County Clerk
- In office 1895–1903

Personal details
- Born: Frank Chester Jordan; April 3, 1860 Haycrafts Ferry, Shasta County, California, U.S.
- Died: January 18, 1940 (aged 79) Sacramento, California, U.S.
- Political party: Republican
- Spouse: Emma Morrill (m. 1881; died 1935)
- Children: Grace; Robert; Nettie; Frank
- Relatives: William H. Jordan (brother); Henry Vrooman (brother-in-law)
- Occupation: Clerk
- Known for: Longest-serving state official in the country at time of death

Frank Chester Jordan (April 3, 1860 – January 18, 1940) was the 20th Secretary of State of California, serving eight terms from 1911 until his death in 1940. At the time of his death, he was the longest-serving state official in the nation. His son, Frank M. Jordan, was elected to succeed him in 1942, the first man in the history of California to be elected to succeed his father in a state constitutional office.

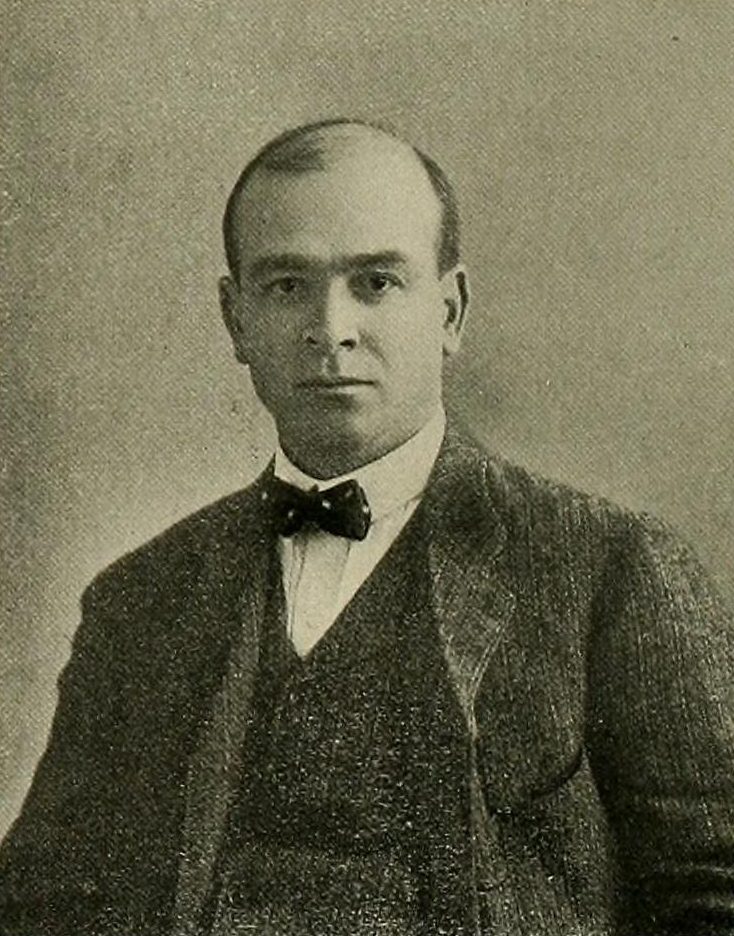
Jordan as a candidate for Clerk of the Supreme Court, 1902

== See also ==
- 1938 California Secretary of State election

Political offices
Preceded by Charles F. Curry	California Secretary of State; 1911–1940	Succeeded by Paul Peek
