= Arthur Ohnimus =

American politician

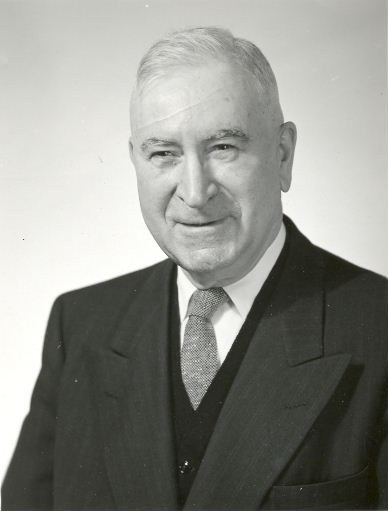

31st Chief Clerk of the California State Assembly
- In office 8 January 1923 – 4 October 1963
- Preceded by: Jerome B. Kavanaugh
- Succeeded by: James D. Driscoll

Personal details
- Spouse: Bernice Wemple
- Profession: Attorney

Arthur Allen Ohnimus (1893–1965) was the longest serving Assembly Chief Clerk in California history (1923–1963). He was also the first Chief Administrative Officer of the Assembly Rules Committee (1957–1963). Ohnimus served under 8 Republican and 4 Democratic Speakers of the Assembly during his 37 cumulative years as Chief Clerk. The California Assembly honored the legacy of Arthur Ohnimus on April 1, 2008, when it adopted House Resolution 28. A 10-minute video tribute to Ohnimus was also produced by the Assembly and is now posted online, along with historic documents and informational brochures

In California, the Chief Clerk is a nonpartisan officer of the Legislature, responsible for advising the presiding officer on parliamentary rulings, guiding legislators on legislative procedures, and overseeing the records and votes of the house. Although Ohnimus was registered as a Republican, it was Democratic Speaker Gordon Garland that brought back Ohnimus in January 1941 after a four-year hiatus. In 1958, Ohnimus authored the book, "The Legislature of California." Ohnimus's years of Capitol service closely mirrored that of his colleague, Joseph Beek, who served as Secretary of the upper house from 1913 to 1968.

Because the California Legislature was a part-time institution prior to 1967, Ohnimus also maintained full-time outside employment during most of his terms as Chief Clerk: he served as Deputy District Attorney for San Francisco (1924–1944); and Deputy Attorney General of California (1944–1957).

Due to expanding legislative workloads, in 1957 he resigned as Deputy Attorney General to take on the dual legislative roles of Chief Clerk of the Assembly and the newly created position of Chief Administrative Officer of the Assembly Rules Committee. As CAO, he was instrumental in creating the foundation for the modern legislative staff structure in the California Legislature. He created job classifications, salary ranges, and personnel manuals, and laid the groundwork for the transition to a full-time legislature. He was routinely re-elected as Chief Clerk unanimously by Democratic and Republican members of the Assembly each year he sought office.

Ohnimus retired at age 70 in 1963. He was succeeded by James D. Driscoll, who would go on to serve 23 years as Chief Clerk.

== Biography ==
Ohnimus was born in the "south of the slot" neighborhood of San Francisco on June 3, 1893. He was the son of Louis Juan Ohnimus, who was the Superintendent of Woodward Gardens amusement park in San Francisco (circa 1880s) and later President of the San Francisco Civil Service Commission in 1902. Arthur's mother was Grace D. Pierce, who was a famous San Francisco stage actress who was instrumental in the mayoral campaign of E.E. Schmitz in 1902.

Arthur Ohnimus was raised in the Western Addition neighborhood and attended Hearst Grammar School and Sacred Heart College. At age 21, Arthur began his long career at the State Capitol when he was appointed as a committee clerk in the California Assembly in January 1915. During his time as a clerk in the Assembly, Ohnimus worked alongside fellow young aspiring clerks such as Earl Warren (later U.S. Chief Justice) and Arthur Samish (later a legendary lobbyist). Arthur's first known exploration into partisan politics was in 1916, when he campaigned for Progressive San Francisco Assembly Member Nick J. Prendergast. In subsequent years, he would also manage the campaign of S.F. District Attorney Matthew Brady. Ohnimus later abandoned partisan politics in favor of nonpartisan clerk positions in the state Assembly.

In 1921, Ohnimus was elected Minute Clerk of the Assembly. It was also in June 1921 that he graduated with a law degree from St. Ignatius College (St. Ignatius would later be renamed University of San Francisco). He was President of the Native Sons of the Golden West "El Dorado Parlor" in San Francisco in the 1920s. He was admitted to the State Bar in March 1922. On January 8, 1923, Ohnimus was elected Chief Clerk of the Assembly for the Forty-Fifth Session. He was reelected each session thereafter until his retirement in 1963 (with the exception of 1937-1940 when he did not seek election). In 1957, the Assembly Rules Committee appointed Ohnimus as the Assembly's first Chief Administrative Officer, making him the first full-time Assembly employee. During his years as Chief Clerk, Ohnimus oversaw the installation of the electronic voting system and public address system, and the evolution of the legislature from a weak, part-time body, to a stronger, more active "hybrid" institution, with career staff and more complex legislation.

Ohnimus married Bernice M. Wemple on December 27, 1943. Bernice was the daughter of Judge N.V. Wemple, who served in the California Assembly from 1924 to 1928, representing Lassen County. Arthur Ohnimus died on March 13, 1965, at the age of 71. He is buried at East Lawn cemetery in Sacramento, California.

== Sources ==
- California Legislative Handbooks, 1952, 1954, 1958, 1961. Office of State Printing.
- Journals of the Assembly, 1915, 1921, 1923, 1965.
- California's Legislature (2006 edition). E. Dotson Wilson, California State Assembly.
- California Blue Books (various editions, including 1961). Office of State Printing.
- The El Doradan, August 1927 (newsletter of the Native Sons of the Golden West, San Francisco)
- San Francisco Chronicle, April 3, 6 & 9th, 1903 editions)
