= Loutitt =

Loutitt is a surname. Notable people with the surname include:

- Alexandria Loutitt (born 2004), Canadian ski jumper
- Jason Loutitt (1974–2021), Canadian runner and cyclist

== See also ==
- Louttit
