= Senator Nielsen =

Senator Nielsen or Nielson may refer to:

- Jim Nielsen (born 1944), California State Senate
- Mark Nielsen (attorney) (born 1961), Connecticut State Senate
- Roy J. Nielsen (1886–1964), California State Senate
- Howard C. Nielson (1924–2020), Utah State Senate
