= Louttit =

Louttit is a surname. Notable people with the surname include:

- Darren Louttit (born 1965), Australian rules footballer
- Henry I. Louttit, Sr. (1903–1984), American Episcopal bishop
- Henry I. Louttit, Jr. (1938–2020), American Episcopal bishop
- James A. Louttit (1848–1906), American politician
- Jason Louttit, Canadian marathon runner
- Stacie Louttit (born 1961), Canadian Paralympic sailor
- Tom H. Louttit (1898–1967), American politician

Louttit may also refer to:

- Louttit Laundry, a former laundry business in Rhode Island

== See also ==
- Loutit, a related surname
