= Sarah E. Kellogg =

American politician (1870–1957)

Sarah Ellen Kellogg
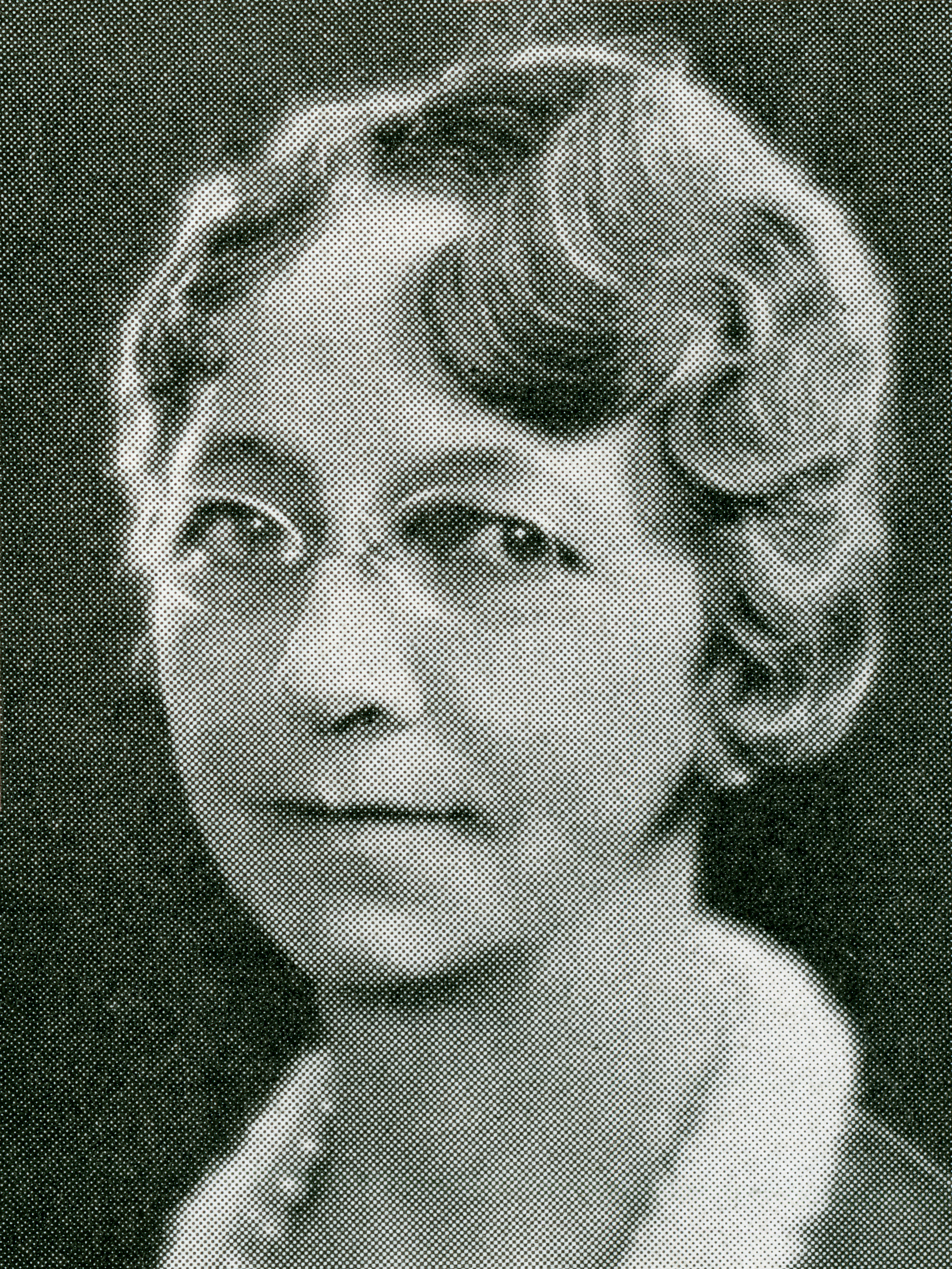
- Official portrait, 1932

Member of the California State Assembly from the 51st district
- In office January 5, 1931 – January 2, 1933
- Preceded by: Z. S. Leymel
- Succeeded by: William Moseley Jones

Personal details
- Born: Sarah Ellen Carr; June 21, 1870 Olean, New York, U.S.
- Died: May 21, 1957 (aged 86) Los Angeles, California, U.S.
- Resting place: Calvary Cemetery (Los Angeles)
- Party: Republican
- Spouse: Frederick A. Kellogg
- Occupation: Politician, postmaster, real estate agent

Sarah Ellen Kellogg (née Carr, June 21, 1870 – May 21, 1957) was an American politician, postmaster, and a real estate agent in California. She was elected in 1930 to California's 51st State Assembly district which encompasses parts of western Los Angeles; where she served from January 5, 1931, to January 2, 1933. She was active in Republican circles, women's clubs, and civic groups.

== Biography ==
She was born on June 21, 1870, in Olean, New York. She married Frederick A. Kellogg, an early real estate agent in the Van Nuys neighborhood. They lived in Los Angeles.

Kellogg was the third president of the Women's Club of Van Nuys, from 1916 to 1918; and she was the founder of the Republican Women's Clubs of the San Fernando Valley.

Kellogg was elected to California's 51st State Assembly district which encompasses parts of western Los Angeles; where she served from January 5, 1931, to January 2, 1933. In January 1933, she started working as a postmaster. Kellogg also worked for 12 years at the California State Board of Equalization.

Kellogg died on May 21, 1957, in Los Angeles, and is buried at Calvary Cemetery in East Los Angeles.

California Assembly
Preceded by Z. S. Leymel	California State Assemblyman, 51st District; January 5, 1931 – January 2, 1933	Succeeded by William Moseley Jones
