= Doug Kyle =

Canadian long-distance runner, coach, and sport builder (1932–2023)

Medal record

Men's Athletics

Representing Canada

Pan American Games
Silver medal – second place	1959 Chicago	10,000 metres
Bronze medal – third place	1959 Chicago	5,000 metres

Douglas Haig Kyle (July 22, 1932 – August 27, 2023) was a Canadian long-distance runner, athletics coach, official, and sport builder. Born in Toronto, Ontario, he competed for Canada in the 1950s and 1960s, set numerous national records, and played a central role in developing athletics in Alberta. Kyle was the founder of the Calgary Marathon and the Calgary Track and Field Club, and later became a respected coach, official, and senior sport advocate.

== Early life ==
Kyle was born in Toronto and lived in several Canadian cities, including Guelph, Galt, Ottawa, Saskatoon, and Vancouver, before settling in Calgary in 1958.

He studied at the University of Saskatchewan before transferring to the University of British Columbia in 1952, where he competed in track and cross-country. At UBC he set several records and was part of relay teams that established Canadian marks.

Kyle later attended the University of Michigan, where he ran track and continued to develop his distance running before returning to Canada.

== Athletic career ==
Kyle represented Canada at multiple international competitions:

- 1954 British Empire Games – Vancouver
- 1956 Summer Olympics – Melbourne (23rd in 10,000 m; eliminated in first round of 5,000 m)
- 1959 Pan American Games – Chicago (silver in 10,000 m; bronze in 5,000 m)
- 1960 Summer Olympics – Rome (8th in 5,000 m semifinal)
- 1963 Pan American Games – São Paulo (4th in 5,000 m; 5th in 10,000 m)

=== National championships and records ===
Kyle won 14 Canadian Open Championships across multiple distances:

- 5,000 m – 1957, 1958, 1959
- 5,000 m indoor – 1960
- 10,000 m – 1954, 1956, 1957, 1959, 1960
- 10 miles – 1962
- Marathon – 1963
- Cross country – 1957, 1961, 1964

While a graduate student at the University of Michigan, Kyle also competed in U.S. national meets and won the AAU 10,000 metres championship in 1957, making him the United States national champion at that distance.

He also held Canadian records in every distance over two miles, including two-mile, three-mile, six-mile, ten-mile, and fifteen-mile events, as well as 3,000 m, 6,000 m, 10,000 m, and 25,000 m. His personal bests included 14:12.5 for the 5,000 m and 30:12.6 for the 10,000 m, both set in 1960.

== Founding of Calgary Marathon and sport building ==
Kyle was the driving force behind the creation of the Calgary Marathon. Along with Bill Wylie, he organized the first race on August 10, 1963 at Glenmore Stadium, marking the first marathon ever run in Western Canada. Nineteen men entered the inaugural event, each paying a $1 entry fee; twelve finished, and Kyle won in a time of 2:45:54. The course was an out-and-back route along Macleod Trail, with five water stations (ten total on the double-length course), measured using a car odometer to approximate the distance of 26 miles, 385 yards.

Kyle’s aim in establishing the race was also to secure the 1964 Canadian Olympic Trials Marathon for Calgary. The second edition of the Calgary Marathon, held in 1964, fulfilled that role and doubled as the Olympic Trials.

In 1958, Kyle and his wife Carol co-founded the Calgary Track and Field Club (Caltaf), the first track and field club in the city, which became a hub for developing young athletes.

== Coaching and officiating ==
Kyle served as coach of the Canadian track team at the 1968 Olympics and was cross-country coach at the University of Calgary in the 1970s.

He also served as coach with the University of Calgary Athletics Club (UCAC).

He officiated at major competitions, including:

- 1976 Summer Olympics – Montreal
- Commonwealth Games (1978, 1982, 1994)
- Pan American Games (multiple editions)
- 1988 Winter Olympics – Calgary
- Paralympic Games (1992 Barcelona, 1996 Atlanta, 2000 Sydney, 2004 Athens)

Athletics Alberta noted that Kyle remained active in refereeing and officiating meets well into his later years.

== Sport advocacy and infrastructure ==
Kyle was a longtime advocate for the creation of an indoor multisport fieldhouse in Calgary. As early as the 1960s and 1970s, he spoke publicly about the need for such a facility to support track and field athletes and other sports in the city.

In 2008 he became an early executive member of the Calgary Multisport Fieldhouse Society, a group formed to lobby for and plan a world-class indoor facility. The society’s efforts eventually helped secure support for what is now moving toward construction as Calgary’s long-awaited fieldhouse project.

== Masters and later competition ==
Kyle remained active in athletics and senior sport well into his later years. He regularly participated in the World Masters Games and other senior competitions, often in recreational divisions. While these results were not at the same level as his earlier national and international performances, they reflected his lifelong commitment to sport and fitness.

He also carried the Olympic torch with the Canadian track and field team in Trail, British Columbia, during the lead-up to the 2010 Winter Olympics.

== Honours and recognition ==
Kyle received numerous awards over his career:

- Outstanding Canadian University Athlete (1954)
- Crowe Award – Outstanding Canadian Amateur Athlete (1956)
- Canada’s Outstanding Track Athlete (1956, 1957, 1959)
- Calgary Athlete of the Year (1960)
- Calgary Booster Club Sportsperson of the Year (1969), then known as the "Sportsman of the Year" — at 36, he was the youngest man to receive the award
- Inducted into the Alberta Sports Hall of Fame (1959)
- Inducted into the UBC Sports Hall of Fame (2011)
- Inducted into the Calgary Marathon Hall of Fame

== Later life ==
Kyle was active with the Calgary 55 Plus association, serving as a board member and president, and continued to promote senior sport locally and provincially.

Beyond athletics, he was a longtime member of the Rotary Club and volunteered with the Calgary Stampede Parade Committee, reflecting his broader commitment to community service.

== Death ==
On August 27, 2023, Kyle was involved in a single-vehicle rollover crash near the intersection of 114th Avenue and 84th Street Southeast in Calgary, just east of Ralph Klein Park. He was transported to hospital, where he later died. He was 91 years old.

== Legacy ==
Kyle is remembered as one of Canada’s most versatile and record-setting distance runners of the 1950s and 1960s, and for his foundational roles in Alberta athletics. He founded the Calgary Marathon in 1963, established the Calgary Track and Field Club, set numerous Canadian records, and later contributed as a coach, official, mentor, and advocate for sport infrastructure.

Beyond his competitive career, Kyle remained deeply involved in the sport community. He attended nearly every Calgary Marathon since its inception, volunteering in many roles, including medal presentations, volunteer orientations, and race-day operations. His wife, Carol, also volunteered alongside him for many years until her death. In recognition of his lifelong contributions, Kyle was inducted into the Calgary Marathon Hall of Fame.

The Calgary Marathon, which he founded, has grown into Alberta’s largest road race and continues to honour his vision. The track and field facility at Calgary’s Challenger Park was also named in his honour, recognizing his contributions as a donor.
