= William Moseley Jones =

American politician (1905–1988)

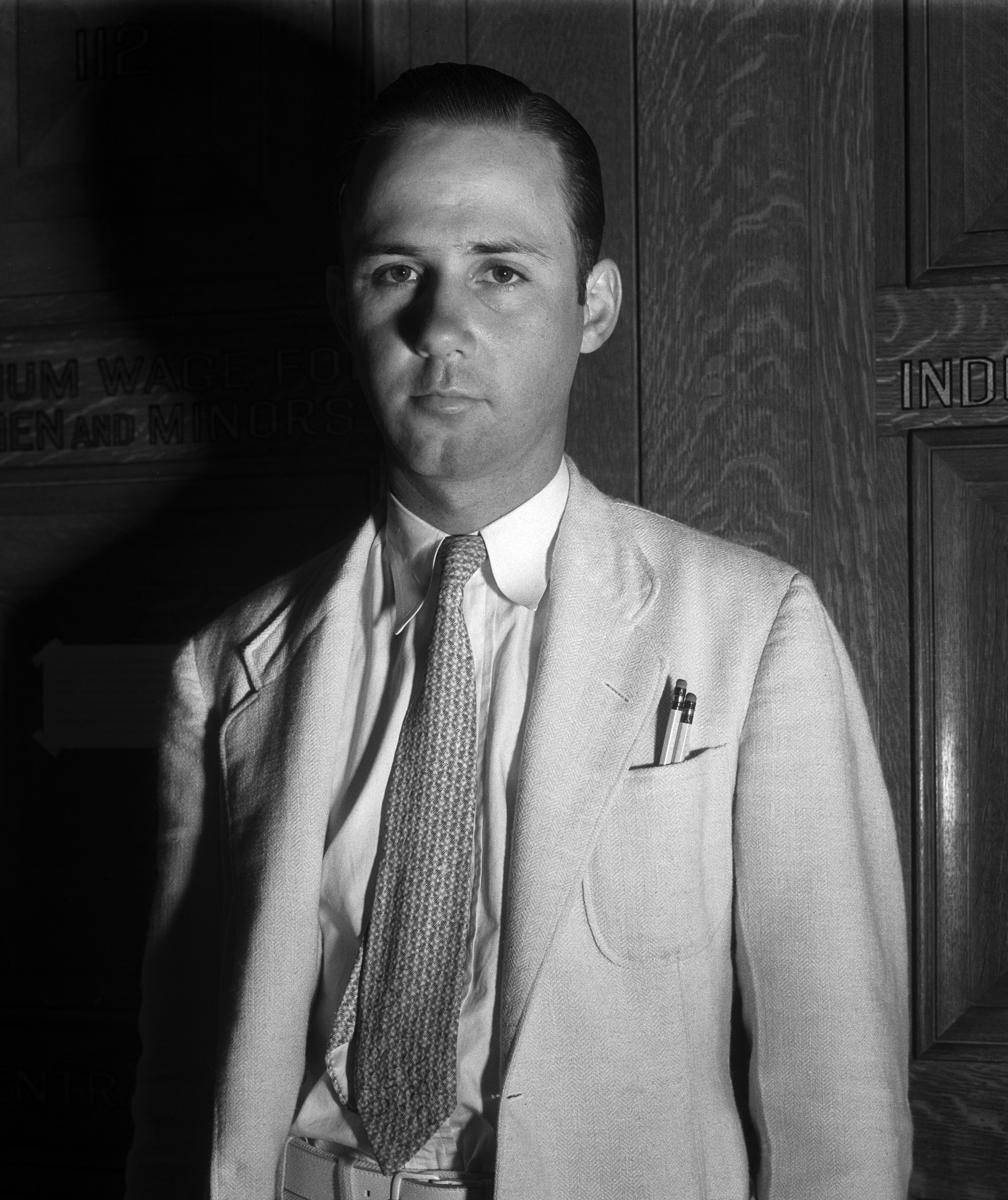

46th Speaker of the California State Assembly
- In office January 1937 – November 1938
- Preceded by: Edward Craig
- Succeeded by: Paul Peek

Member of the California State Assembly from the 51st district
- In office January 2, 1933 – January 2, 1939
- Preceded by: Sarah E. Kellogg
- Succeeded by: F. Ray Bennett

Personal details
- Born: William Moseley Jones; July 6, 1905 Portsmouth, Ohio, U.S.
- Died: March 24, 1988 (aged 82) Newport Beach, California, U.S.
- Party: Democratic
- Profession: Attorney, Legislator, Banking Executive

William Moseley Jones (1905–1988) was a Democratic attorney from Montebello, California, who served several terms in the California State Assembly, including one term as speaker.

== Biography ==
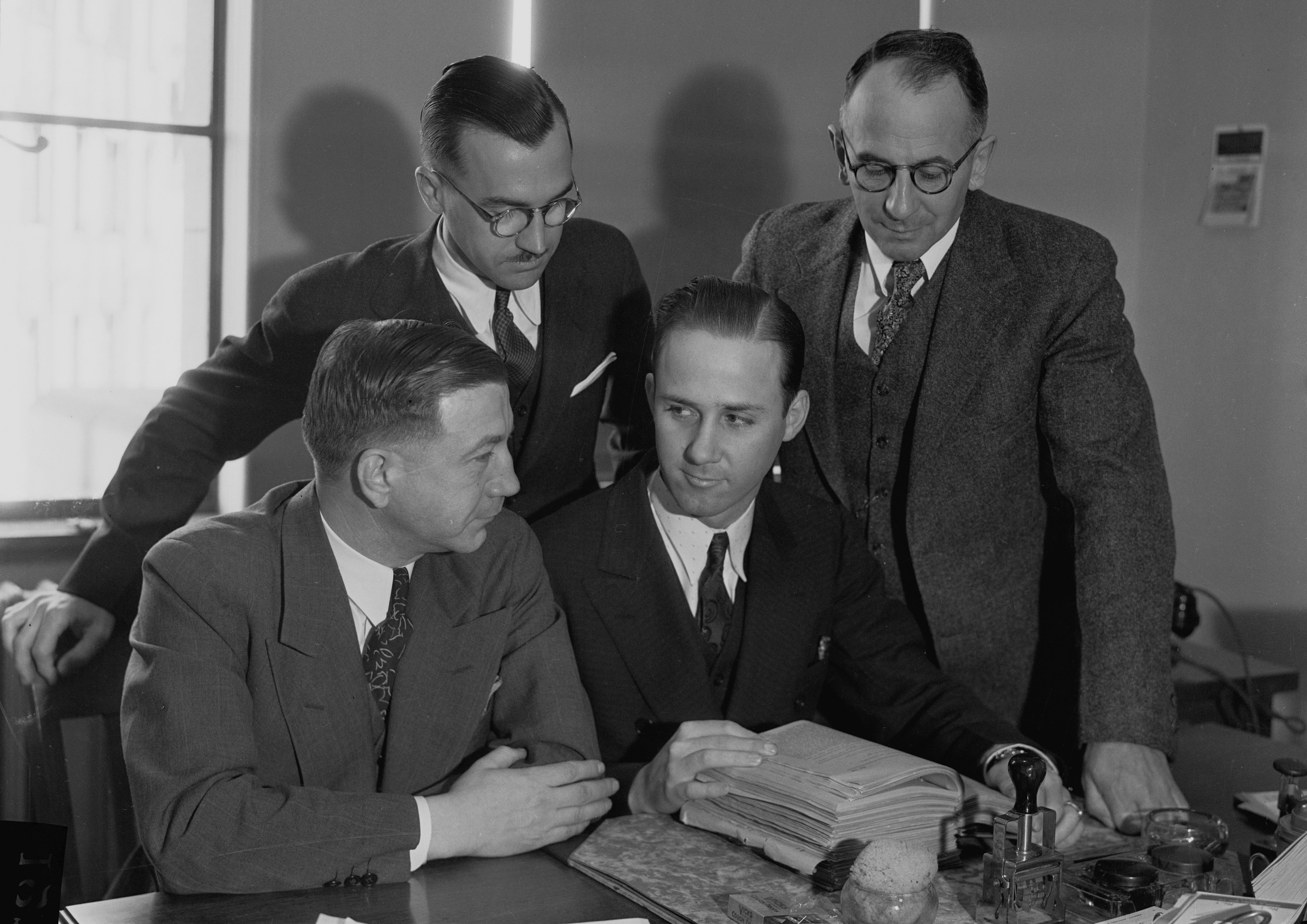
Assemblymen assess the value of oil in state-owned tidelands, 1936. Seated (L-R): Ben Rosenthal, William Moseley Jones. Standing: Claud Minard, John Evangelist Frazier.

William Moseley Jones was raised in Las Vegas, Nevada. He attended Occidental College and received a law degree from the University of Southern California in 1927. After practicing law in Los Angeles for five years, Jones was elected to represent the 51st Assembly District (Montebello) in 1932. In 1934, Jones was an "EPIC Democrat" and was their choice for Speaker of the Assembly. In the 1936 elections, California Democrats gained their first Assembly majority in the 20th century and elected Jones as Speaker for the 1937 session.

Jones was a Mason, Redmen, Elk, and was President of the Belvedere Gardens Lions Club in the 1930s.

In 1944, Jones helped organize a savings and loan that, in 1953, became Pacific Savings and Loan. Jones served as President of Pacific Savings and Loan for many years thereafter. In 1969, Jones was elected President of the California Savings and Loan League.

Jones died at age 82 on March 24, 1988, and is buried at Pacific View Memorial Park in Newport Beach, California.

California Assembly
Preceded by Sarah E. Kellogg	California State Assemblyman, 51st District; January 3, 1933 – January 2, 1939	Succeeded by F. Ray Bennett
Political offices
Preceded by Edward Craig	Speaker of the California State Assembly; January 1937 – November 1938	Succeeded by Paul Peek
