= Vic Fazio =

American politician (1942–2022)

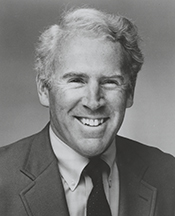

Chair of the House Democratic Caucus
- In office January 3, 1995 – January 3, 1999
- Leader: Dick Gephardt
- Preceded by: Steny Hoyer
- Succeeded by: Martin Frost

Chair of the Democratic Congressional Campaign Committee
- In office January 3, 1991 – January 3, 1995
- Leader: Tom Foley
- Preceded by: Beryl Anthony Jr.
- Succeeded by: Martin Frost

Vice Chair of the House Democratic Caucus
- In office June 21, 1989 – January 3, 1995
- Leader: Tom Foley
- Preceded by: Steny Hoyer
- Succeeded by: Barbara B. Kennelly

Member of the U.S. House of Representatives from California
- In office January 3, 1979 – January 3, 1999
- Preceded by: Robert Leggett
- Succeeded by: Doug Ose
- Constituency: 4th district (1979–1993); 3rd district (1993–1999)

Member of the California Assembly from the 4th district
- In office December 10, 1975 – November 30, 1978
- Preceded by: Edwin L. Z'berg
- Succeeded by: Thomas M. Hannigan

Personal details
- Born: Victor Herbert Fazio Jr. October 11, 1942 Winchester, Massachusetts, U.S.
- Died: March 16, 2022 (aged 79) Arlington, Virginia, U.S.
- Party: Democratic
- Spouses: Joella Mason (divorced) Judy Neidhardt Kern (m. 1983; died 2015) Kathy Sawyer (m. 2017)
- Children: 2
- Education: Union College (BA); California State University, Sacramento

Victor Herbert Fazio Jr. (October 11, 1942 – March 16, 2022) was an American politician who served as a member of the United States House of Representatives for California from 1979 to 1999.

== Early life and education ==
Fazio was born in Winchester, Massachusetts, the son of Betty Virginia (Freeman) and V. Herbert Fazio. He was of Italian and New England Yankee descent. After graduating from Madison High School in Madison, New Jersey in 1960, Fazio attended Williston Academy in Easthampton, Massachusetts in 1961. He earned a B.A. from Union College in Schenectady, New York, in 1965, and did graduate work at California State University, Sacramento, from 1969 to 1972. From 1965 to 1966 he was a Coro Foundation Fellow in Los Angeles.

== Political career ==
=== California politics ===
Fazio was a congressional and legislative consultant from 1966 to 1975, during which time he co-founded California Journal magazine in 1970. He served on the Sacramento County Charter Commission from 1972 to 1974, on the Sacramento County Planning Commission in 1975, and as a member of the California State Assembly from 1975 to 1978.

Fazio was a delegate to California state Democratic conventions in 1976 and 1978, and was a delegate to Democratic National Conventions of 1976, 1980, 1984, 1988, 1992, and 1996.

=== Congress ===
Fazio was elected as a Democrat to the 96th and to the nine succeeding Congresses (January 3, 1979 – January 3, 1999). He represented California's 4th congressional district from 1979 to 1993 and after redistricting changed district numbers he represented California's 3rd congressional district from 1993 to 1999.

As congressman, he lobbied to set aside area as a wildlife refuge below the I-80 overpass between Davis and Sacramento. His efforts led to the establishment of the Vic Fazio Yolo Wildlife Area, dedicated in 1997 by President Bill Clinton. The region is in Yolo County and is known to locals as the 'Yolo Bypass,' a seasonal wetlands generated by controlled fall, winter, and spring flooding. The refuge provides valuable winter habitat for waterfowl and shorebirds. It is additionally used as a Pacific Flyway stop-over by migrant waterfowl and shorebirds during fall and spring migrations, and can be accessed for visitation by an auto tour route.

Fazio won his first seven terms without serious difficulty, but his district was made measurably more rural and Republican after the 1990s round of redistricting. He only won 51 percent of the vote in 1992 against former state senator H.L. Richardson. In 1994, he was nearly defeated, winning by only three percentage points. In 1996 he was elected by a larger margin, winning 54%. He announced he would not run for re-election in 1998, in November of the prior year. With Fazio gone, the district would go on to elect a Republican, Doug Ose in 1998.

== Later life ==
Fazio worked as a senior advisor in the Washington office of Akin Gump Strauss Hauer & Feld and sat on the board of Northrop Grumman. He served as co-chair of the Information Technology and Innovation Foundation, a public policy think tank. He also sat on the Council on American Politics, bringing together leaders from across the nation to address issues facing the growth and enrichment of The Graduate School of Political Management. In addition, he served on the board of directors of the Committee for a Responsible Federal Budget. After leaving office, he became involved in political reform efforts, including joining nine other former members of Congress to co-author a 2021 opinion editorial advocating reforms of Congress. He was also a member of the ReFormers Caucus of Issue One.

== Personal life ==
After his first marriage to Joella Mason ended in divorce, Fazio was subsequently married to Judy Kern (formerly Judith G. Neidhardt) from 1983 until her death in 2015, aged 71. He then married Kathy Sawyer, a retired journalist, in 2017. He had two daughters from his first marriage to Mason, Dana and Anne; and two step-children from his second marriage to Kern, Kevin and Kristie. Anne died from complications of leukemia in 1995.

== Death ==
Fazio died of melanoma at his home in Arlington County, Virginia, on March 16, 2022, at the age of 79.

== Electoral history ==
Vic Fazio electoral history

1978 United States House of Representatives elections
Party	Candidate	Votes	%
Democratic	Vic Fazio	87,764	55.4
Republican	Rex Hime	70,733	44.6
Total votes		158,497	100.0
Turnout			
Democratic hold			

1980 United States House of Representatives elections
Party	Candidate	Votes	%
Democratic	Vic Fazio (Incumbent)	133,853	65.3
Republican	Albert Dehr	60,935	29.7
Libertarian	Robert J. Burnside	10,267	5.0
Total votes		205,055	100.0
Turnout			
Democratic hold			

1982 United States House of Representatives elections
Party	Candidate	Votes	%
Democratic	Vic Fazio (Incumbent)	118,476	63.9
Republican	Roger B. Canfield	67,047	36.1
Total votes		185,523	100.0
Turnout			
Democratic hold			

1984 United States House of Representatives elections
Party	Candidate	Votes	%
Democratic	Vic Fazio (Incumbent)	130,109	61.4
Republican	Roger B. Canfield	77,773	36.7
Libertarian	Roger Conant Pope	4,039	1.9
Total votes		211,921	100.0
Turnout			
Democratic hold			

1986 United States House of Representatives elections
Party	Candidate	Votes	%
Democratic	Vic Fazio (Incumbent)	128,364	70.2
Republican	Jack D. Hite	54,596	29.8
Total votes		182,960	100.0
Turnout			
Democratic hold			

1988 United States House of Representatives elections
Party	Candidate	Votes	%
Democratic	Vic Fazio (Incumbent)	181,184	100.0
No party	Write-ins	1,306	0.0
Turnout			
Democratic hold			

1990 United States House of Representatives elections
Party	Candidate	Votes	%
Democratic	Vic Fazio (Incumbent)	115,090	54.7
Republican	Mark R. Baughman	82,738	39.3
Libertarian	Bryce Bigwood	12,626	6.0
Total votes		210,454	100.0
Turnout			
Democratic hold			

1992 United States House of Representatives elections
Party	Candidate	Votes	%
Democratic	Vic Fazio (Incumbent)	112,149	51.2
Republican	H. L. Richardson	96,092	40.3
Libertarian	Ross Crain	20,444	8.6
Total votes		228,685	100.0
Democratic hold			

1994 United States House of Representatives elections
Party	Candidate	Votes	%
Democratic	Vic Fazio (Incumbent)	97,093	49.75
Republican	Tim Lefever	89,964	46.10
Libertarian	Ross Crain	8,100	4.15
Total votes		195,157	100.0
Democratic hold			

1996 United States House of Representatives elections
Party	Candidate	Votes	%
Democratic	Vic Fazio (Incumbent)	118,663	53.6
Republican	Tim Lefever	91,134	41.1
Reform	Timothy Erich	7,701	3.4
Libertarian	Erin Donelle	4,239	1.9
Total votes		221,737	100.0
Democratic hold			

California Assembly
Preceded by Edwin L. Z'berg	Member of the California Assembly from the 4th district 1975–1978	Succeeded by Thomas M. Hannigan
U.S. House of Representatives
Preceded by Robert Leggett	Member of the U.S. House of Representatives from California's 4th congressional district 1979–1993	Succeeded by John Doolittle
Preceded by Bob Matsui	Member of the U.S. House of Representatives from California's 3rd congressional district 1993–1999	Succeeded by Doug Ose
Party political offices
Preceded by Steny Hoyer	Vice Chair of the House Democratic Caucus; 1989–1995	Succeeded by Barbara B. Kennelly
Preceded by Beryl Anthony Jr.	Chair of the Democratic Congressional Campaign Committee; 1991–1995	Succeeded by Martin Frost
Preceded by Steny Hoyer	Chair of the House Democratic Caucus; 1995–1999	Succeeded by Martin Frost
