= Forsythe Charles Clowdsley =

American politician

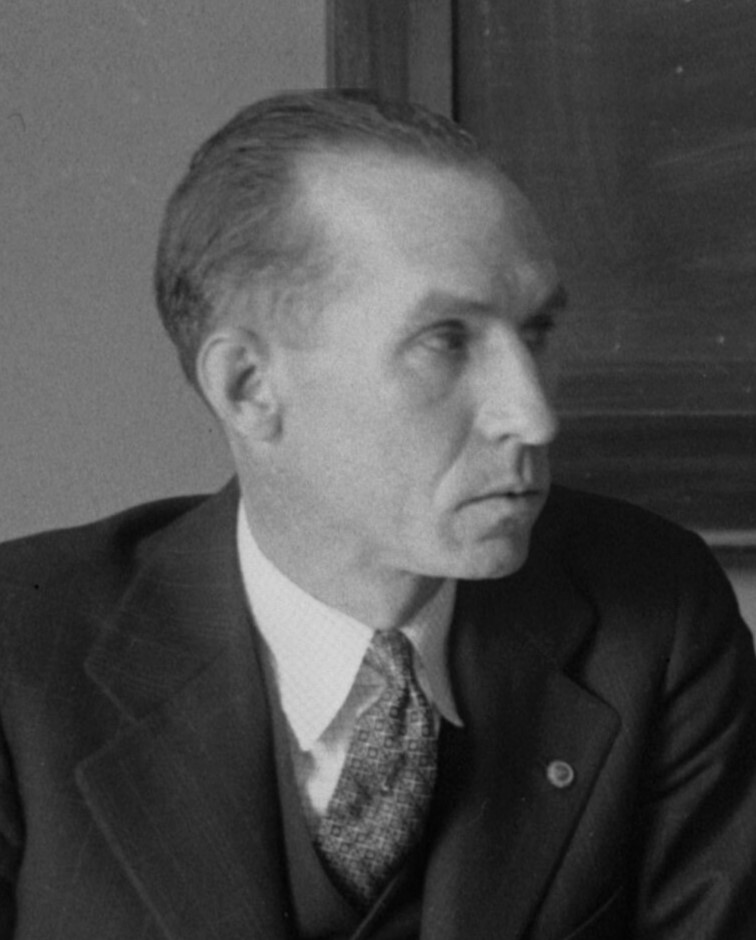
- Clowdsley in 1929

44th Speaker of the California State Assembly
- In office September 1934
- Preceded by: Walter J. Little
- Succeeded by: Edward Craig

Member of the California State Assembly
- In office January 2, 1933 – January 7, 1935
- Preceded by: Roy J. Nielsen
- Succeeded by: Dana P. Eicke
- Constituency: 11th district
- In office January 5, 1931 – January 2, 1933
- Preceded by: Percy G. West
- Succeeded by: William W. Hoffman
- Constituency: 15th district
- In office January 3, 1927 – January 5, 1931
- Preceded by: Tom H. Louttit
- Succeeded by: Theodore McKay Wright
- Constituency: 20th district

Personal details
- Born: Forsythe Charles Clowdsley; February 6, 1895 Stockton, California
- Died: September 26, 1940 (aged 45) Stockton, California
- Party: Democratic

Military service
- Branch/service: United States Army
- Battles/wars: World War I

Forsythe Charles Clowdsley (February 6, 1895 – September 26, 1940) was a United States Democratic politician, serving in the California State Assembly.

Clowdsley was born in California. During World War I he served in the United States Army.

Clowdsley served in the California State Assembly from 1927 to 1935, and was Speaker of the California State Assembly in 1934. He was San Joaquin County District Attorney during the Stockton Cannery Strike of 1937.

California Assembly
Preceded by Tom H. Louttit	California State Assemblyman, 20th District; 1927-1931	Succeeded by Theodore McKay Wright
Preceded by Percy G. West	California State Assemblyman, 15th District; 1931–1933	Succeeded by William W. Hoffman
Preceded by Roy J. Nielsen	California State Assemblyman, 11th District; 1933-1935	Succeeded by Dana P. Eicke
Political offices
Preceded by Walter J. Little	Speaker of the California State Assembly; September 1934	Succeeded by Edward Craig
