= Doug Ose =

American politician (born 1955)

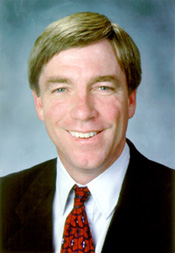

Member of the U.S. House of Representatives from California's 3rd district
- In office January 3, 1999 – January 3, 2005
- Preceded by: Vic Fazio
- Succeeded by: Dan Lungren

Personal details
- Born: Douglas Arlo Ose; June 27, 1955 (age 71) Sacramento, California, U.S.
- Party: Republican
- Spouse: Lynnda Ose
- Education: University of California, Berkeley (BS)
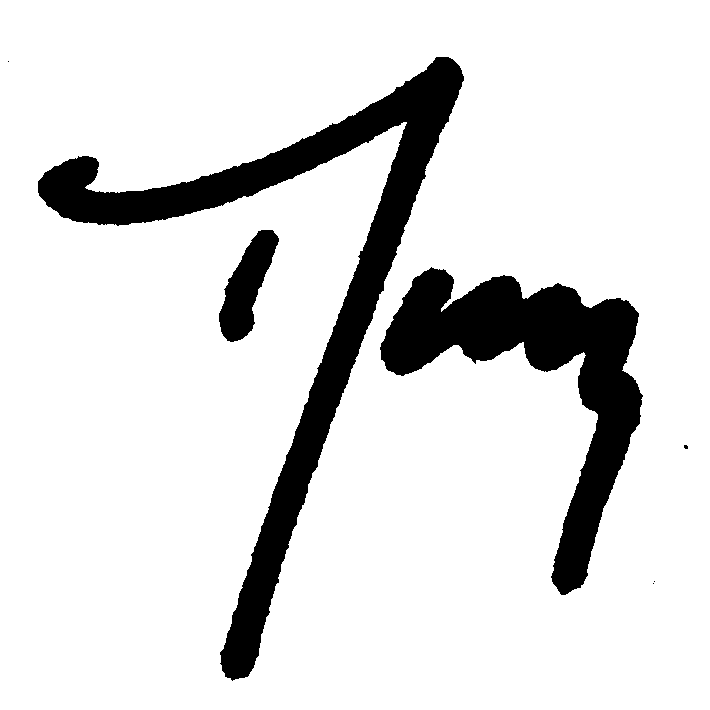
- Signature

Douglas Arlo Ose (/ˈoʊsi/ OH-see; born June 27, 1955) is an American businessman and politician who served as the U.S. representative for California's 3rd congressional district from 1999 to 2005. He is a member of the Republican Party. On March 16, 2021, Ose announced his intention to run for Governor of California in the 2021 California gubernatorial recall election of Governor Gavin Newsom. On August 17, 2021, Ose announced that he was withdrawing from the race after suffering a heart attack.

== Early life and education ==
Ose was born and raised in Sacramento, California. He graduated from Rio Americano High School and in 1977, earned a B.S. in business administration from the University of California, Berkeley. At Berkeley, he was a member of Sigma Nu. After graduating from college, Ose began his career as a real estate developer.

== U.S. House of Representatives ==
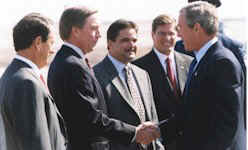
Ose greeting President George W. Bush in 2002

During his time in Congress, Ose was named a "Hero of the Taxpayers" by Americans for Tax Reform, a "Guardian of Small Business" by the National Federation of Independent Business and earned a "Tax Fighter" award from the National Tax Limitation Committee.

In 2001, Ose voted for one of the largest tax cuts in American history, a $1.35 trillion tax reform package that ended the marriage penalty tax, lowered the estate tax and increased child tax credits.

In December 2003, Ose introduced a bill (H.R. 3687) to outlaw the broadcast of George Carlin's "seven dirty words", including "compound use (including hyphenated compounds) of such words and phrases with each other or with other words or phrases, and other grammatical forms of such words and phrases (including verb, adjective, gerund, participle, and infinitive forms)". The bill omitted "tits", but included "asshole", which was not one of Carlin's original seven words. The bill was referred to the House Judiciary Subcommittee on the Constitution in January 2004, where it was tabled.

As Chairman of a House Government Reform Committee, Ose held hearings to promote legislation to change rules governing gifts to presidents.

In an effort to complete construction of a border fence originally started in 1996, Ose, along with David Dreier, co-authored a bill that would grant the United States Secretary of Homeland Security authorization to ignore all laws deemed "necessary to ensure the expeditious construction of the barriers and roads under this section".

According to The Sacramento Bee, during his congressional tenure, Ose appeared regularly in lists of the wealthiest members of Congress. This was based on the value of his real estate holdings purchased in the 1980s. According to financial disclosures his net worth is between $51.5 million and $175 million.

Ose honored a self-imposed term-limit pledge and declined to run for re-election to the U.S. House in 2004.

=== Committee assignments ===
- House Government Reform Committee (chair)
- House Agriculture Committee
- House Financial Services Committee

== Elections ==
=== Congressional ===
==== 1998–2002 ====
In 1998, Ose decided to run for California's 3rd congressional district. In the open primary, he ranked first with 30% of the vote. His next closest competitor, Democrat Sandie Dunn, received 23% of the vote.

Ose and Dunn qualified for the general election, in which Ose defeated Dunn by a margin of 52%–45%. Ose won re-election in 2000 with 56% of the vote and again in 2002 with 62% of the vote.

==== 2008 ====
In 2008, Ose ran in the primary election in California's 4th congressional district, a seat being left vacant by retiring Congressman John Doolittle. Ose lost the primary bid to Tom McClintock.

==== 2014 ====
On September 3, 2013, Ose formally announced his candidacy for his old district, which had been renumbered as the 7th district, in hopes of facing freshman Democrat Ami Bera, who unseated Dan Lungren in 2012. On June 3, Ose qualified for the November general election by ranking second in the open primary with 26% of the vote. He defeated Republicans Igor Birman and Elizabeth Emken. Bera ranked first with 48% of the vote and faced Ose in the general election. The Rothenberg Political Report rated the contest as a "Pure Toss-up"; and even eight days after the November 4 election, the race was still undecided, with Bera leading Ose by just 711 votes at the time with 19,000 ballots yet to be counted. Ultimately, Ose lost the race to Bera by 0.8%.

=== 2018 California gubernatorial race ===
Ose hinted in 2017 that he was considering running for Governor of California in the 2018 election, telling the Los Angeles Times that he was "gravely concerned" about the state's future, elaborating "there's no other way to describe it – we've gone backwards. I don't care whether you're talking about housing or quality of jobs that are available or road maintenance or the homeless question. There's nobody in office today that's doing anything about it." He announced he would run in January 2018. In February, however, Ose determined this was not the right time. While discussing his decision to not pursue the office at that time, Ose told Fox Business' Stuart Varney: "Cost of housing is out of control, K-12's failing, homeless everywhere, traffic gridlock, no jobs, it's just like...go down the checklist and they're 0 for life." Ose then formed Rebuild California Foundation, a 501(c)(3) Tax-Exempt Educational Organization, to research and propose solutions for the top issues affecting the lives of everyday Californians.

=== 2021 California gubernatorial recall race ===
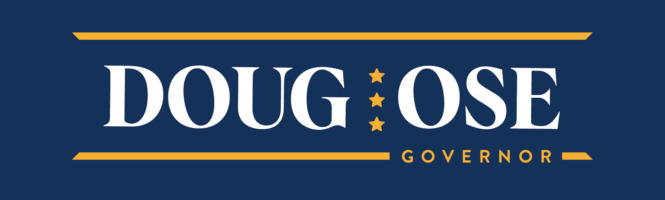
Campaign logo

On March 16, 2021, Ose announced his intention to run for Governor of California in the recall election of Gavin Newsom. However, on August 17, 2021, Ose announced he was dropping out of the race after suffering a heart attack. Despite having withdrawn from the race, he received 0.4% of the replacement candidate vote.

== Other notable work ==
Since his departure from Congress, Ose has been a member of the board of directors of the Republican Main Street Partnership, a more traditional conservative movement of Members of Congress. The 501(c)(4) is tied to more than 60 current Members of Congress.

== Personal life ==
Ose is married to Lynnda Ose. They have two daughters, Erika and Emily, who attended Ose's former high school, Rio Americano High School. Their main residence is in the unincorporated area of Sacramento County.

In 2011, when budget constraints forced the closure of Gibson Ranch Park in Rio Linda, Ose applied to run the facility as its private operator. Since Ose began managing the park in April 2011, the regional park was open daily and welcomed about 250,000 visitors. The park, as of December 1, 2019, is now being managed by the Sacramento County Department of Regional Parks.

Along with then-Senator Barbara Boxer, Ose had a cameo appearance in the 2002 Gilmore Girls episode "Those Lazy-Hazy-Crazy Days".

== Electoral history ==
United States House of Representatives elections
Party	Candidate	Votes	%
Republican	Doug Ose	100,621	52.41
Democratic	Sandie Dunn	86,471	45.04
Libertarian	Ross Crain	4,914	2.56
Total votes		192,006	100.0
Republican gain from Democratic			

United States House of Representatives elections
Party	Candidate	Votes	%
Republican	Doug Ose (Incumbent)	129,254	56.2
Democratic	Bob Kent	93,067	40.4
Libertarian	Douglas Arthur Tuma	5,227	2.2
Natural Law	Channing E. Jones	2,634	1.1
Total votes		230,182	100.0
Republican hold			

United States House of Representatives elections
Party	Candidate	Votes	%
Republican	Doug Ose (Incumbent)	117,466	62.4
Democratic	Howard Beeman	64,990	34.5
Libertarian	Douglas Arthur Tuma	5,847	3.1
Total votes		188,303	100.0
Republican hold			

California's 7th congressional district election, 2014
Party	Candidate	Votes	%
Democratic	Ami Bera (incumbent)	92,521	50.4
Republican	Doug Ose	91,066	49.6
Total votes		183,587	100.0
Democratic hold			

U.S. House of Representatives
Preceded by Vic Fazio	Member of the U.S. House of Representatives from California's 3rd congressional district 1999–2005	Succeeded by Dan Lungren
U.S. order of precedence (ceremonial)
Preceded by Jay Kim as Former U.S. Representative	Order of precedence of the United States as Former U.S. Representative	Succeeded by Laura Richardson as Former U.S. Representative
