= Edwin L. Z'berg =

American politician

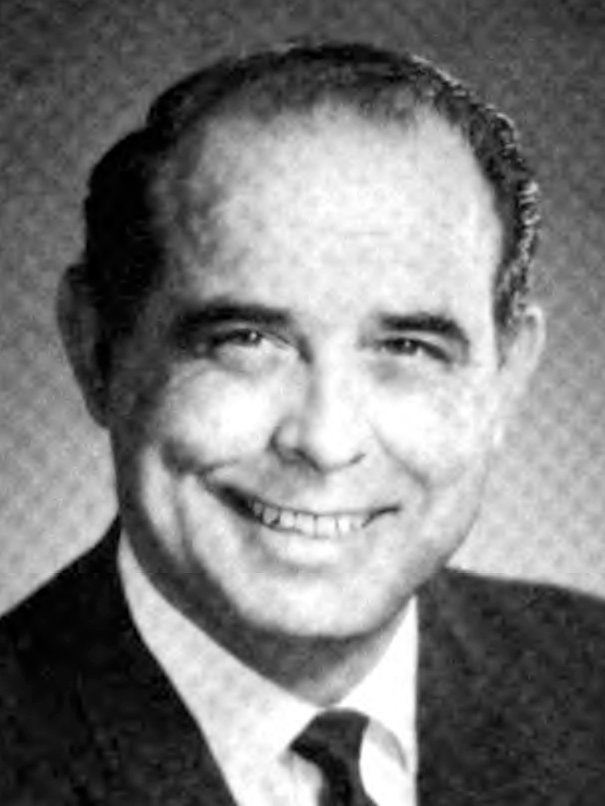
- Official portrait, 1975

Member of the California State Assembly from the 4th district
- In office December 2, 1974 – August 26, 1975
- Preceded by: Ray E. Johnson
- Succeeded by: Vic Fazio

Member of the California State Assembly from the 9th district
- In office January 5, 1959 – November 30, 1974
- Preceded by: Roy J. Nielsen
- Succeeded by: Michael Wornum

Personal details
- Born: Edwin Lewis Z'berg; March 20, 1926 Sacramento, California, U.S.
- Died: August 26, 1975 (aged 49) Sacramento, California, U.S.
- Party: Democratic
- Spouse: Edna Merle Coz
- Children: 4

Military service
- Branch/service: United States Navy
- Rank: Lieutenant (junior grade)

Edwin Lewis Z'berg (March 20, 1926 – August 26, 1975) was a Democratic member of the California State Assembly representing the 9th district from 1958 to 1974, and 4th district from 1974 until his death in 1975. He served in the United States Navy during the World War II era. As chair of the Committee on Natural Resources, he crafted legislation that established open space, funded state park acquisitions, created a workable system of state timber management, and established off-road vehicle policies. In the 1960s and early 70s he led California's actions to protect Lake Tahoe's environment, authoring a bistate regional authority bill that created the Tahoe Regional Planning Agency, TRPA. He was unstinting in efforts to strengthen TRPA's protections of the lake. Ed Z'berg Sugar Pine Point State Park on Tahoe's west shore is named for him, as are a neighborhood and park in southwestern Sacramento near Interstate 5.

== Early life ==
Z'berg was born in Sacramento, California, the son of Swiss immigrants Louis and Katherine Z'berg. He graduated as valedictorian from Sacramento High School. During World War II he enlisted in the United States Navy in 1944 and was discharged in 1947 as an Ensign. He then became a member of the U.S. Naval Reserve intelligence unit, eventually retiring in 1966 at the rank of Lieutenant (junior grade). Z'berg attended the University of California, Los Angeles where he earned a Bachelor of Arts degree and a President's Scholarship to attend the University of San Francisco School of Law. He graduated summa cum laude from law school, with the highest scholastic record in his class.

== Career ==
Z'berg first practiced law in Sacramento as a deputy District Attorney, then in October 1952 he opened a private law office as a criminal defense attorney to handle the cases of a fellow lawyer who had been called into the Navy. He became active in local political organizations, serving as president of the Sacramento County Young Democrats and chairman of the Sacramento County Democratic Council.

Z'berg first ran for elected office in 1956, running as the Democratic Party candidate for California's 9th District in the California State Assembly. Z'berg lost by a narrow margin to the long-time Republican Party incumbent. The following election in 1958, Z'berg again ran for the 9th District seat which was being vacated by the Republican Party incumbent. Z'berg was never seriously challenged and defeated his opponent 43,183 votes to 20,421.

Z'berg was recognized as a legislative leader on environmental issues. He was the chairman of Natural Resources, Planning and Public Works Committee. As chairman of the Resources and Land Use Committee in the California State Assembly, Z'berg created legislation to fund anti-litter campaigns, to ban pull-tab drink cans, and to increase the rate of clean-up along roads and shorelines.

Through the 1960s, Z'berg introduced multiple bills that made him an important proponent of the conservation movement and his political efforts were supported financially by more than a dozen conservations groups including the Sierra Club, California Roadside Council, Antilitter League, League to Save Lake Tahoe, Save the Bay Association, California State Horsemen's Association and the Planning and Conservation League.

Z'berg's greatest impact on environmental policy was his focus on preserving the esthetics and natural beauty of Lake Tahoe. He used his position on the Natural Resources committee to defeat plans for a freeway along the west side of the lake and a bridge over Emerald Bay. In 1966, in support of bill AB11 to protect Lake Tahoe's south shore from sewage pollution, Z'berg said, "we shouldn't delude ourselves into thinking this will have a long-range effect." He warned that there would be multiple environmental crises and it required a long-term solution.

The following year, he introduced a bill to create a bistate agency with both California and Nevada board members to regulate pollution and overdevelopment in the entire Lake Tahoe area. Z'berg fought against a competing plan which would have limited agency authority to only the California portion of Tahoe, or lack of a bistate plan that would have ceded regulatory control to the federal government. The California portion of Z'berg's Tahoe Regional Planning Agency was signed into law by governor Ronald Reagan on November 8, 1967. However, Nevada's sister bill was called "ineffectual" and "water-downed" by Z'berg for too many amendments by special interests and he had it defeated in committee. Both Reagan and Nevada governor Paul Laxalt publicly criticized Z'berg. Reagan said that Zberg would be known as the "man who was responsible for the destruction of one of the world's greatest scenic wonders." A compromise plan by Z'berg for the bistate agency which allowed the stronger California standards for the Nevada side of the lake was soon passed in a special session of the Nevada legislature. The TRPA bistate agency was ratified by the U.S. Congress in December 1969

By 1971, the use of dune buggies, jeeps and ATVs had exploded on California public lands but these vehicles remained unregulated and a broad spectrum of government regulators, conservationists, livestock owners and private land owners desired regulation. Z'berg co-authored the Chappie-Z'berg Off-Highway Motor Vehicle Law with Republican assemblyman Eugene A. Chappie to protect and preserve public lands. The bill required registration of all vehicles, set limits on noise output and used registration fees to acquire and to develop special areas for OHV use. Governor Reagan signed the law in December 1971.

After the California court tossed out state regulations for cutting timber on privately owned forests because oversight was dominated by the lumber industry, Z'berg introduced a bill which returned majority control of the 8 million acres of privately owned forests to the public. He negotiated with a competing bill in the state senate and with Governor Ronald Reagan's administration before the combined Z'berg-Nejeldy Forest Practices Act was signed into law in 1973.

Z'berg was convicted of Driving under the influence following a traffic accident in 1972. He had been previously convicted of DUI in 1969 and had also been arrested for public intoxication in Monterey in 1965. For the second DUI he served the mandatory sentence of two days in jail, one year of probation and a required 8-hour rehabilitation course.

In 1974, Z'berg again ran for reelection, but now for the assembly seat in California's 4th district due to a reapportionment plan. Because reapportionment had decreased the number of registered Democrats in the district by 10%, his Republican Party opponent made a strong push to defeat Z'berg. Z'berg narrowly won reelection for a ninth straight term, winning 50.5% of the vote.

Z'berg died while in office in 1975. Shortly thereafter, legislators passed a resolution naming a portion of Lake Tahoe's Sugar Pine Point State Park as the Z'berg Natural Preserve. In 2003, despite objection by local residents and against an unofficial policy of naming parks for politicians, Governor Gray Davis signed legislation renaming the entire park as the Ed Z'berg Sugar Pine Point State Park.

== Awards ==
- In 1967, Z'berg was given an honorary award by the California Conservation Council for legislative efforts to protect the environment of the Lake Tahoe area.
- In 1969, he received the Man of the Year Award by the Mother Lode Chapter of the Sierra Club.
- In 1970, the California Landscape Contractors Association awarded him their Daisy Award.
- In 1971, he won the Audubon Society's Conservation Award and the Fraternal Order of Eagles' Civic Service Award.
- In 1972, Z'berg was designated Legislator of the Year by the California Trial Lawyers Association.
- In 1974, the California Department of Parks and Recreation named Z'berg as the year's outstanding environmentalist with the Golden Bear Award.

== Personal life ==
On March 29, 1953 Z'berg married Edna Merle Coz (1925-2004). They raised four children together: Vicki, John, and Cynthia as well as Edna's daughter, Susan, from a previous marriage. Z'berg was a member of the Veterans of Foreign Wars, Sacramento Swiss Lodge, the Fraternal Order of Eagles and the Aircraft Owners and Pilots Association.

He died of heart failure on August 26, 1975 at the age of 49.
