= Loutit =

Loutit is a surname. Notable people with the surname include:

- Blythe Loutit (1940–2005), South African illustrator
- Isobel Loutit (1909–2009), Canadian statistician
- Jessie Loutit (born 1988), Canadian rower
- John Freeman Loutit (1910–1992), Australian haematologist and radiobiologist
- Margaret Loutit (1929–2020), New Zealand microbiologist

== See also ==
- Louttit, a related surname
