= Ed Z'berg Sugar Pine Point State Park =

State park in California, United States

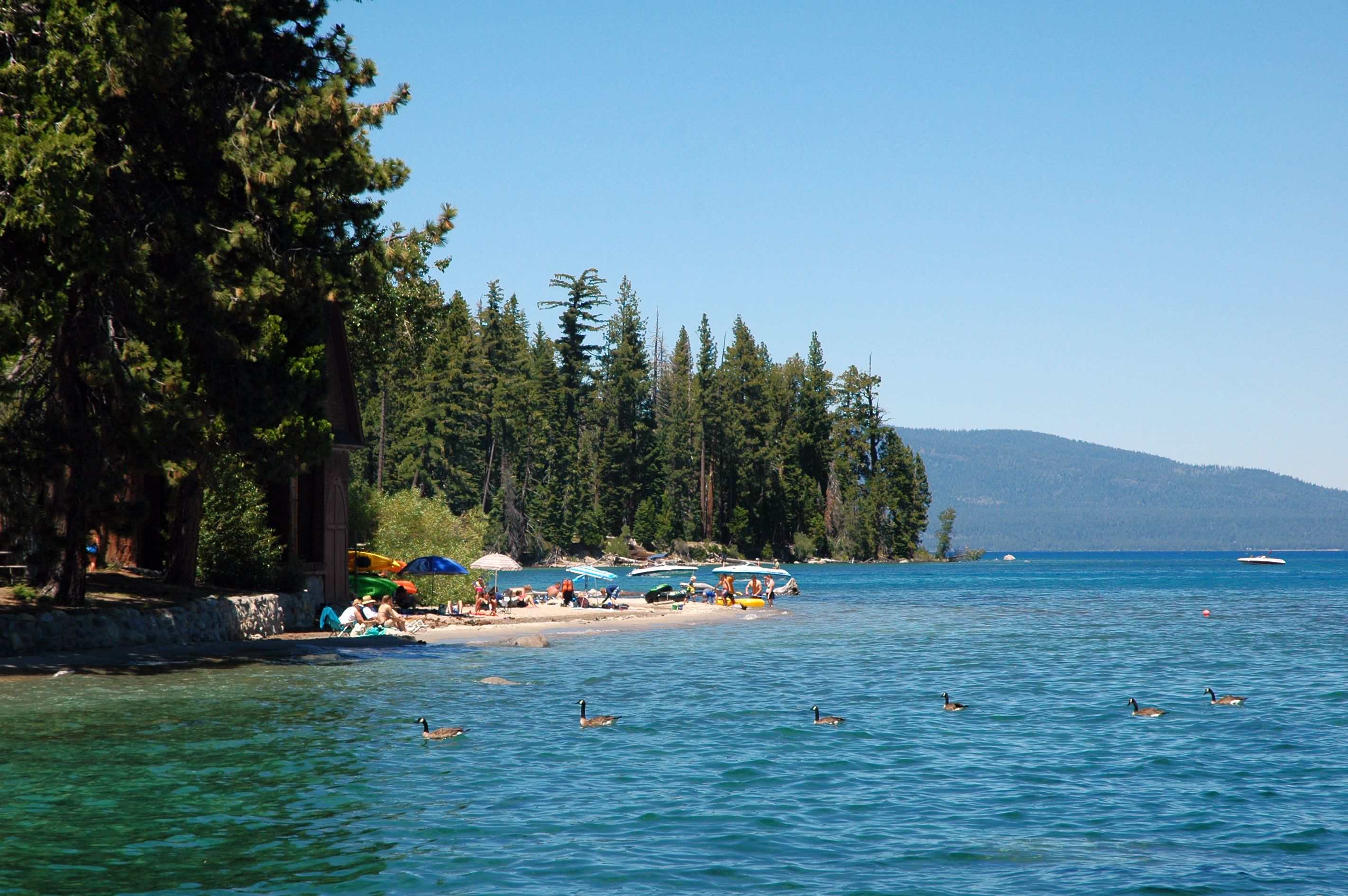
- Lake Tahoe

- Location within California Location within the United States
- Location: El Dorado County, California
- Nearest city: Tahoma, California
- Coordinates: 39°03′27″N 120°07′21″W
- Area: 1,000 hectares (2,500 acres)
- Established: 1965
- Governing body: California Department of Parks and Recreation
- Ed Z'berg Sugar Pine Point State Park
- U.S. National Register of Historic Places
- NRHP reference No.: 73000401
- Added to NRHP: March 30, 1973

Ed Z'berg Sugar Pine Point State Park is a state park in California in the United States. It occupies nearly two miles of the western shore of Lake Tahoe and a total of about 1,000 hectares (2,500 acres) of forested mountains in El Dorado County. Originally called Sugar Pine Point State Park, its name was changed in 2003 to honor Edwin L. Z'berg, a California state assemblyman who specialized in environmental legislation and worked to develop state parks and other natural areas. Part of the natural area is old-growth forest and recognized by Old-Growth Forest Network.

== Natural features ==
The park is in the high Sierra Nevada mountain range at an elevation of around 1,900 metres (6,200 ft). It is covered in mixed coniferous forest with tree species such as Jeffrey pine (Pinus jeffreyi), white fir (Abies concolor), Sierra lodgepole pine (Pinus contorta ssp. murrayana), California incense cedar (Calocedrus decurrens), sugar pine (Pinus lambertiana), and red fir (Abies magnifica). Black cottonwood (Populus trichocarpa) and quaking aspen (Populus tremuloides) are part of the local fall foliage display. This forest is not pristine, having been subjected to heavy logging in the late 1800s. Wood was used by miners in the Comstock Lode and other great mineral deposits. Long-term fire suppression and periods of drought and bark beetle infestation have altered the fire regime. Controlled burns are used to help prevent very destructive wildfires.

The park is bisected by General Creek, a stream about 15 kilometers long which runs from the Desolation Wilderness into Lake Tahoe. On the General Creek Trail along the stream there are lakes, mountain meadows with wildflowers, and two large moraines. The trail leaves the park and enters Eldorado National Forest.

In the summer, the high temperature is about 80 °F (27 °C) and the low is near 40 °F (4 °C). Winter highs reach about 40 °F and the coolest lows are below 0 °F (−18 °C). The park receives about 32 inches (810 mm) of precipitation in an average year, mostly in the form of snow in the winter.

== History ==
The area was inhabited by the Washoe people, who made a summer home on the lakeshore. Their stone mortars can be found in the park. The trapper William "General" Phipps was the first white settler on the land. The cabin he built in 1860 still stands.

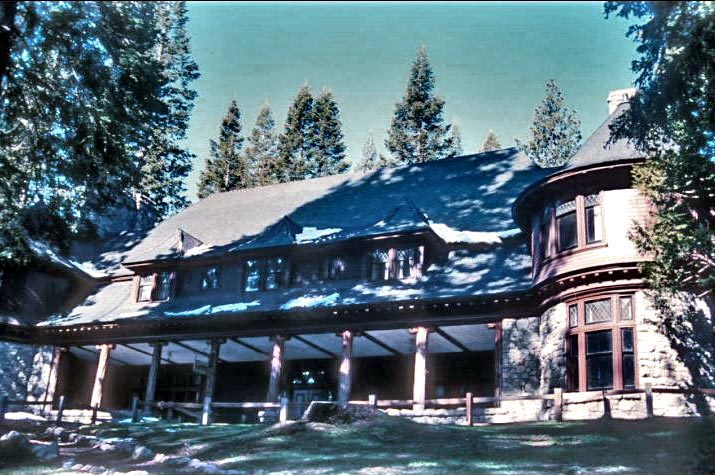
Hellman-Ehrman Mansion

In 1903 the wealthy San Francisco banker Isaias W. Hellman obtained land and built the Pine Lodge, now also known as the Hellman-Ehrman Mansion. The house was designed by Walter Danforth Bliss and featured electric lighting, indoor plumbing, and water directly from the lake. The estate included a tennis court, two boathouses, and cabins for the 27 resident staff. Hellman's family spent summers on the estate for decades, and sold it to the state in 1965 when the park was established. The family still provides funds for the upkeep of the mansion and property.

The 1960 Winter Olympics were held in and around the nearby Squaw Valley Ski Resort. The biathlon and cross-country skiing events took place in what is now the state park. The park and the communities of the western shore of Lake Tahoe hold an annual Olympic Heritage Celebration Week every January to commemorate the events.

== Recreation ==
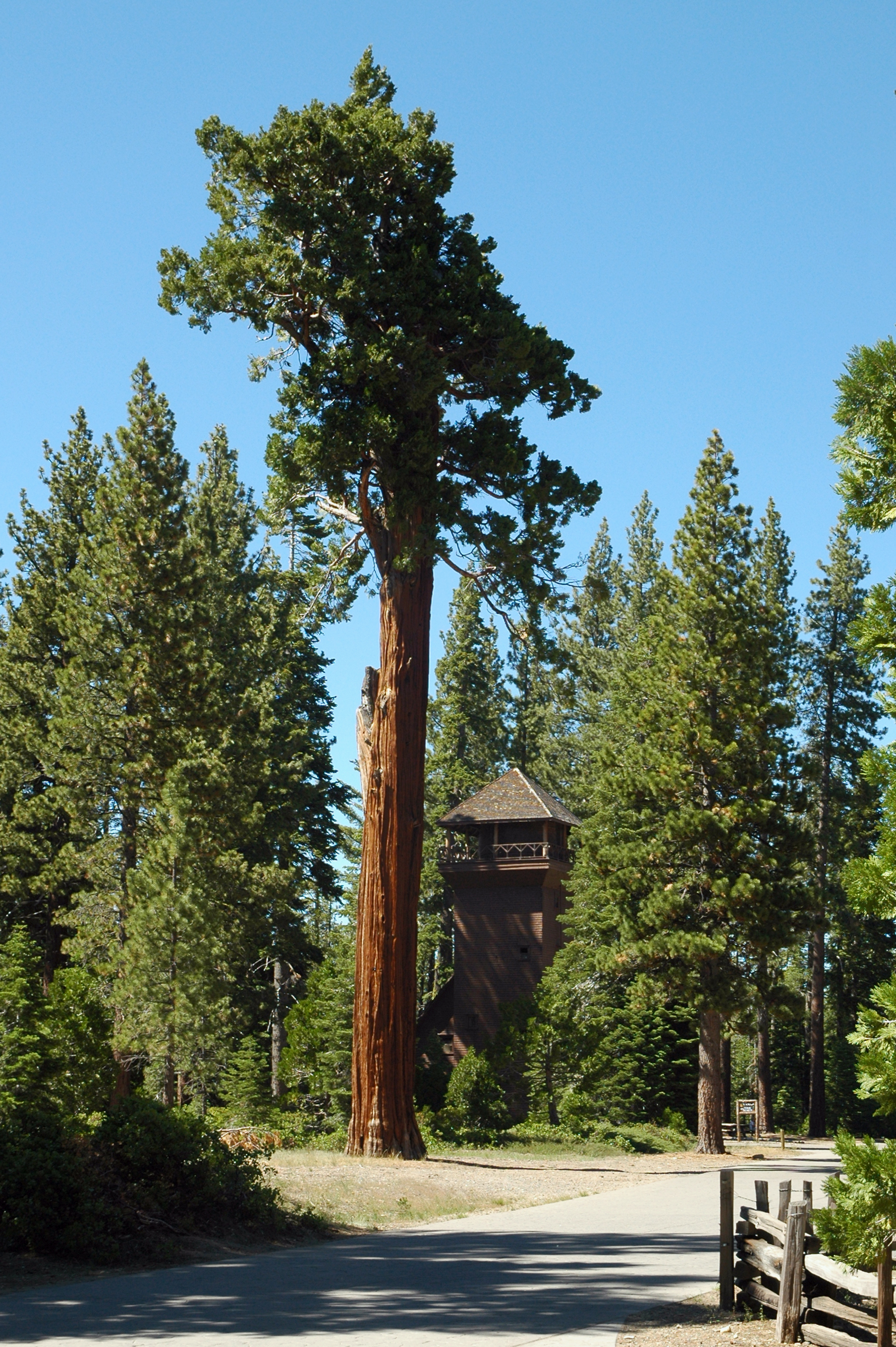
Sequoia tree and nature center tower in summer.

This is the only California state park in the Sierra Nevada that operates recreational facilities during the winter. There are 11 miles (18 km) of skiing and snowshoeing trails for public use, some of which were sites of the Olympic events in 1960. Some snow paths are machine groomed. Park rangers lead occasional snowshoeing tours of the park. Winter camping is available, with many more sites opening for the summer.

Other summer recreation includes swimming and other beach activities, fishing, and hiking. There is a nature center for education and interpretation.

== See also ==
- D. L. Bliss State Park
- Sugar Pine Point Light
