= Calgary Marathon =

Annual race in Calgary, Alberta, Canada

- Date: May
- Location: Calgary, Alberta, Canada
- Event type: Road
- Distance: Marathon; Half marathon 10 km 5 km
- Primary sponsor: Servus Credit Union
- Established: 1963
- Website: Calgary Marathon
- Participants: 17,280 (2025)

The Calgary Marathon is an annual race held in Calgary, Alberta, Canada. First held in 1963, and annually since 1971, it has a certified running distance of 26.219 mi (42.195 km). The marathon is certified by Athletics Canada and is registered with the Association of International Marathons and Distance Races (AIMS), allowing it to serve as a qualifying marathon race.

In 2014, a record 15,000 participants came out to celebrate Canada's longest running marathon turning 50, including 500 participants who competed in the first-ever 50 km ultra. In 2022, the Calgary Marathon welcomed Servus Credit Union as the title sponsor. In 2023, the finish line was relocated to Enmax Park.

In 2024, the Calgary Marathon celebrated its 60th "Diamond" Anniversary with a one-time 60 km ultramarathon road race and finisher medals that featured two "diamonds". In 2024 the marathon handed out non-alcoholic beer at aid stations, becoming the first marathon in North America to offer non-alcoholic beer at an official aid station along the course.

In 2025, the Calgary Marathon saw 17,280 runners participate in its races, roughly 17% more than the previous record of 14,750 from 2014. 2025 was also the first year that saw races held over two days, with 5 km and 10 km races held on Saturday, and the half marathon and marathon held on Sunday.

== History ==
The Calgary Marathon was founded in 1963 by Canadian Olympian Doug Kyle and local runner Bill Wyllie. The inaugural race was held on 10 August 1963 beginning at Glenmore Stadium in Calgary. Nineteen runners entered the race and twelve completed the course. Kyle won the inaugural race in a time of 2:45:54.

The race was originally organized in part to help Calgary host the Canadian Olympic marathon trials ahead of the 1964 Summer Olympics. After the inaugural event the marathon was held intermittently for several years before becoming an annual event beginning in 1971.

During the 1970s and 1980s the event gradually expanded as distance running became more popular in North America. Local running clubs and volunteers played a significant role in organizing and sustaining the race during its early decades. Over time the event developed into a larger community road race and began attracting competitive runners from across Canada and internationally.

By the early 2000s the race had grown into one of Western Canada’s largest running events. Additional race distances were introduced, including the half marathon, 10 km, and 5 km races, allowing runners of varying experience levels to participate in race weekend events.

In 2014 the race celebrated its 50th anniversary with approximately 15,000 participants and introduced a 50 km ultramarathon distance for the first time.

In 2017, as part of celebrations marking the 150th anniversary of Canadian Confederation, the event organized a special 150 km relay ultramarathon known as the Canada 150 Ultramarathon.

The race continued to expand during the 2020s, introducing new race formats and community initiatives. In 2024 the Calgary Marathon celebrated its 60th anniversary with a one-time 60 km ultramarathon event.

== Course and event format ==
The marathon follows a certified 42.195 km road course through Calgary neighbourhoods and along portions of the city's pathway system along the Bow River. The race typically finishes at Enmax Park near the Calgary Stampede grounds.

At approximately 1,045 metres (3,428 ft) above sea level, the race is held at a higher elevation than many major North American marathons.

Race weekend includes several distances:

- Marathon (42.2 km)
- Half marathon (21.1 km)
- 10 km
- 5 km

Beginning in 2025 the event adopted a two-day race format, with the 5 km and 10 km races held on Saturday and the half marathon and marathon held on Sunday.

== Participation and community impact ==
Participation in the Calgary Marathon has increased significantly since the race’s founding. While the inaugural race had only nineteen entrants, modern editions of the race attract tens of thousands of participants across all race distances.

In 2014 approximately 15,000 runners participated during the race’s 50th anniversary.

Participation reached a record high in 2025 when 17,280 runners took part across all race distances.

The event also attracts thousands of volunteers and spectators each year and is considered one of Calgary’s largest community sporting events.

== Servus Charity Challenge ==
The Calgary Marathon hosts the Servus Charity Challenge, a fundraising initiative that allows runners to raise funds for registered charities while participating in the race.

Introduced in 2012, the program has raised millions of dollars for charitable organizations in the Calgary region.

== COVID-19 pandemic ==
The 2020 edition of the Calgary Marathon was converted to a virtual event due to the global COVID-19 pandemic. Participants were encouraged to complete their race distance independently while following public health guidelines.

== Notable race features ==
In 2024 the Calgary Marathon became the first marathon in North America to offer non-alcoholic beer at an official aid station along the course.

== Organization ==
The Calgary Marathon is organized and operated by Run Calgary (The Calgary Marathon Society), a non-profit race organization dedicated to promoting running and community fitness in Calgary.

Run Calgary organizes several road races and community running programs throughout the year in addition to the Calgary Marathon race weekend. The organization’s events collectively bring together more than 25,000 runners annually and raise significant funds for local charities.

Run Calgary is governed by the Calgary Marathon Society, a volunteer-led non-profit organization supported by professional staff, a volunteer board of directors, and a race committee responsible for planning and delivering events.

In addition to organizing races, the organization supports community programs, youth running initiatives, and charity fundraising activities intended to promote healthy and active lifestyles in the Calgary region.

== Past results ==
Key: Course record

Edition	Year	Men's winner	Time (h:m:s)	Women's winner	Time (h:m:s)
61st	2025	Kip Kangogo (CAN)	2:28:42	Kelly Challinor (CAN)	2:52:05
60th	2024	Jordan Clay (CAN)	2:35:59	Emily James (CAN)	2:49:16
59th	2023	Lance Risseeuw (CAN)	2:36:04	Maria Zambrano (CAN)	2:48:02
58th	2022	Kip Kangogo (CAN)	2:32:54	Maria Zambrano (CAN)	2:46:49
57th	2021	Justin Kurek (CAN)	2:33:15	Lauren Barr (CAN)	2:57:09
56th	2020	*moved to virtual event*			
55th	2019	Jonathan Chesoo (KEN)	2:19:34	Leanne Klassen (CAN)	2:51:04
54th	2018	Feyera Gemeda (ETH)	2:16:37	Caroline Kiptoo (KEN)	2:43:36
53rd	2017	Daniel Kipkoech (CAN)	2:22:33	Gladys Tarus (KEN)	2:42:15
52nd	2016	Jonathan Chesoo (KEN)	2:21:55	Andrea Glover (CAN)	3:02:14
51st	2015	Jonathan Chesoo (KEN)	2:17:12	Lioudmila Kortchaguina (CAN)	2:48:24
50th	2014	Kip Kangogo (CAN)	2:19:47	Maria Zambrano (CAN)	2:52:45
49th	2013	Bernard Arasa (KEN)	2:28:53	Nadyia Fry (CAN)	2:51:35
48th	2012	Bernard Arasa (KEN)	2:22:47	Tanaya Gallagher (USA)	2:54:24
47th	2011	Jason Loutitt (CAN)	2:33:03	Alisha MacDonald (CAN)	3:15:55
46th	2010	Graeme Wilson (CAN)	2:32:14	Ellie Greenwood (GBR)	2:52:23
45th	2009	Predrag Mladenović (SRB)	2:30:15	Melissa Kalyn (CAN)	3:02:39
44th	2008	David-John Corbett (CAN)	2:32:39	Ann-Marie Gill (CAN)	3:08:54
43rd	2007	Ken Myers (CAN)	2:33:45	Amanda McLeod (CAN)	2:58:46
42nd	2006	Jason Loutitt (CAN)	2:34:58	Jody Urbanoski (CAN)	3:12:19
41st	2005	Jason Loutitt (CAN)	2:27:49	Shauna Skinner (CAN)	3:02:18
40th	2004	Ken Myers (CAN)	2:34:14	Denise McHale (CAN)	3:04:36
39th	2003	Dennis Colburn (CAN)	2:35:58	Sylvia Corbett (CAN)	3:05:54
38th	2002	Dennis Colburn (CAN)	2:46:25	Sylvia Corbett (CAN)	3:04:17
37th	2001	Dennis Colburn (CAN)	2:38:24	Colleen Catley (CAN)	3:05:38
36th	2000	Kelvin Broad (CAN)	2:35:08	Maria Zambrano (CAN)	3:00:55
35th	1999	Ricardo Guerrero	2:33:55	Zita Mulligan	3:06:49
34th	1998	Kelvin Broad	2:27:04	Esther Wolsey	2:50:12
33rd	1997	Kelvin Broad	2:30:07	Colleen Catley	2:59:22
32nd	1996	Kelvin Broad	2:31:55	Jennifer Clark	2:56:08
31st	1995	Kelvin Broad	2:27:54	Jennifer Clark	2:56:08
30th	1994	Kelvin Broad	2:26:19	Sharisse Kyle	3:11:24
29th	1993	Kelvin Broad	2:26:41	Karen Haggard	2:55:07
28th	1992	Dennis Colburn	2:27:38	Frances Bagley	2:53:03
27th	1991	Kelvin Broad	2:23:49	Donna Grisak	2:59:25
26th	1990	Ashley Dustow	2:28:28	Clare Kroshus	2:45:59
25th	1989	Stefan Fekner	2:30:56	Lisa MacBeth	2:51:26
24th	1988	John Bolter	2:25:37	Sharisse Kyle	2:55:31
23rd	1987	John Tolton	2:32:47	Colleen Stevens	2:56:56
22nd	1986	Rob Reid	2:33:05	Colleen Stevens	3:00:33
21st	1985	Roy Davis	2:24:59	Lorna Hawley	2:59:00
20th	1984	John Bolger	2:28:15	Lorna Hawley	2:54:45
19th	1983	Frank Lewis	2:23:37	Lorna Hawley	2:55:42
18th	1982	Rob Reid	2:29:13	Lorna Hawley	2:56:52
17th	1981	Rob Reid	2:26:37	Lorna Hawley	3:07:25
16th	1980	Rob Reid	2:31:29	Joan Groothuysen	3:15:34
15th	1979	David Strand	2:33:28	Linda Edmonds (nee Currie)	2:55:31
14th	1978	Craig Storey	2:37:45	Mary Pat Petley	3:21:15
13th	1977	Peter Moore	2:28:32	Debbie Lane	3:35:47
12th	1976	Peter Moore	2:30:00	Jane Gelineau	4:02:21
11th	1975	Brian Spielman	2:35:15	Carmen Robinson	3:50:12
10th	1974	Bill Herriot	2:35:04		
9th	1973	Wolf Schamberger	2:31:18		
8th*	1972*	Bob Hamilton	2:31:29		
7th	1972	Morris Aarbo	2:33:04		
6th	1971	Michael Graham	2:33:59		
5th	1969	Jim Haddow	2:38:07		
4th	1968	Andy Boychuk	2:29:21		
2nd	1964	Gordon Dixon	2:39:55		
1st	1963	Doug Kyle	2:45:54		

*In 1972 two races were held.

== See also ==
- List of marathon races in North America
- Doug Kyle
- Sport in Calgary
