= Edward Craig (politician) =

American politician (1896–1979)

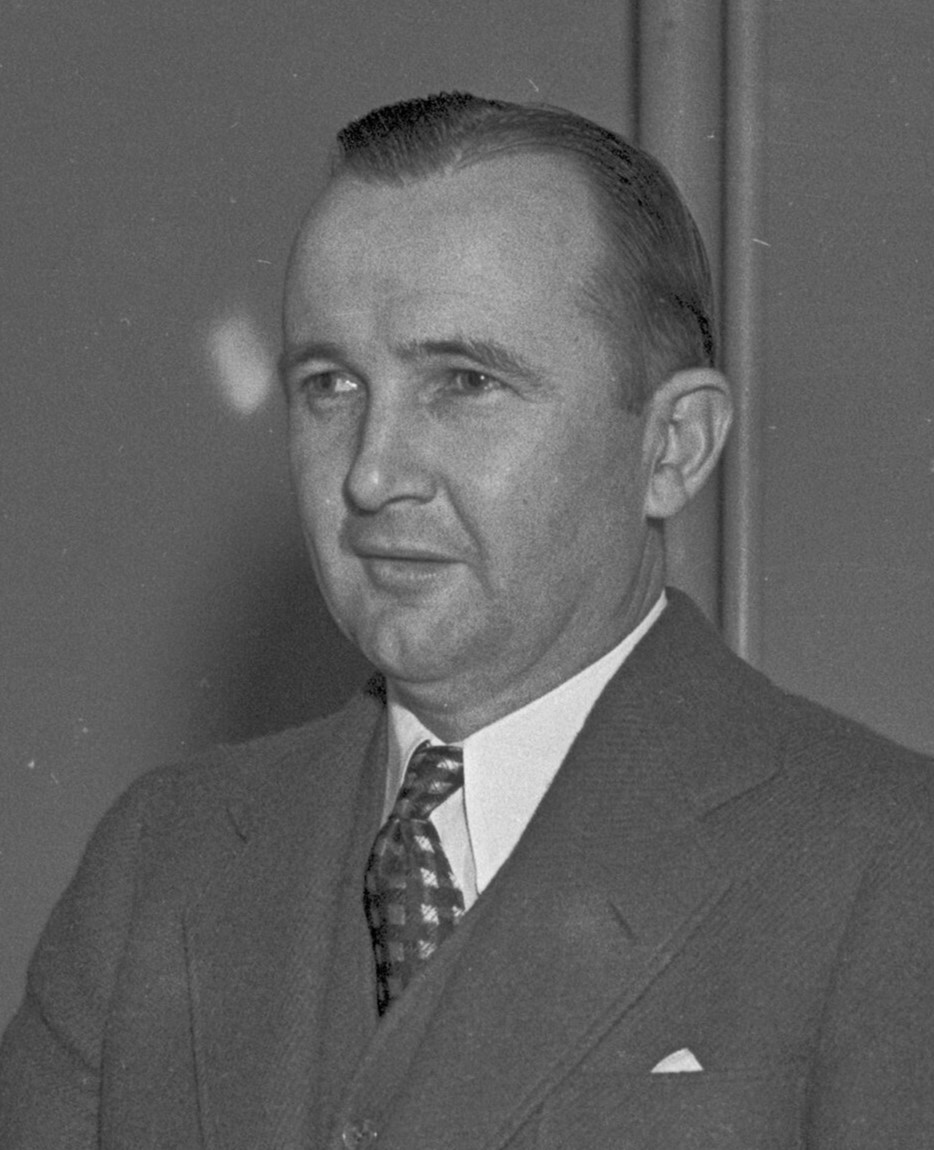
- Craig in 1935

45th Speaker of the California State Assembly
- In office January 1935 – November 1936
- Preceded by: Forsythe Charles Clowdsley
- Succeeded by: William Moseley Jones

Member of the California State Assembly
- In office January 5, 1931 – January 4, 1937
- Preceded by: Emory J. Arnold
- Succeeded by: Thomas Kuchel
- Constituency: 75th district
- In office January 7, 1929 – January 5, 1931
- Preceded by: Charles Dexter Ball
- Succeeded by: Chester M. Kline
- Constituency: 76th district

Personal details
- Born: Edward Craig; November 12, 1896 Los Angeles, California, US
- Died: August 3, 1979 (aged 82) Yorba Linda, California, US
- Party: Republican
- Spouse: Ruth Mary Gatchell (m. 1923)
- Children: 2
- Profession: Machinist, Legislator, Lobbyist

Military service
- Branch/service: United States Army
- Battles/wars: World War I

Edward Craig (November 12, 1896 – August 3, 1979) was a Republican politician from Orange County, California who served in the California State Assembly from 1929 to 1937. Craig served as Speaker of the Assembly from 1935 through 1936.

== Biography ==
Edward Craig was raised in Olinda, California until 1912, when his family moved to Brea. With only an 8th grade education, Craig's original career was as an oil tool machinist. His lack of a higher education did not stop later success in life. In 1928, Craig was elected to the Brea City Council to fill the seat held by his father, who had just retired. That same year, he won a seat in the State Assembly.

Craig was elected Speaker of the Assembly in 1935. As Speaker, he was instrumental in switching from the archaic and time-consuming "oral roll call" voting process in the Assembly, to a new push-button electric voting system in 1935. Craig also served as Mayor of Brea while he was Speaker of the Assembly, as the Assembly was a part-time institution in the 1930s. The low legislative salary caused Craig to decide to not run for reelection to his Assembly seat in 1936. That year, during the Great Depression, Democrats would gain a brief Assembly majority for the first time in over 40 years.

Craig became a lobbyist for Pacific Lighting Corporation late in 1936, a position he held for 28 years. As a lobbyist, Craig was credited in 1953 for convincing Congress to exempt the El Paso Natural Gas Pipeline from requirements of being a common carrier. In 1964, Craig retired from Pacific Lighting and became the lobbyist for Orange County, California. He was credited for passing a legislative amendment to allow Orange County to use revenue bonds to finance public buildings. As a fixture at the State Capitol for 50 years, Ted Craig was still referred to by legislators and staff as "Mr. Speaker" as he lobbied the legislature in the late 1970s.

He died at age 82 in August 1979, survived by his son, Thomas Craig of Wichita, Kansas. Edward Craig is buried at Loma Vista Cemetery in Fullerton, California. In 1980, the California legislature adopted Senate Concurrent Resolution 45 to honor the life and legacy of former Assembly Speaker Edward Craig.

Ted Craig's legacy also exists as Ted Craig Regional Park in Fullerton, California and an alley known as Craig Circle.

Ted Craig was also instrumental in helping Richard Nixon (37th President of the United States of America) becoming more involved in politics.

Preceded by Forsythe Charles Clowdsley	Speaker of the California State Assembly; January 1935–November 1936	Succeeded by William Moseley Jones
