= Tom H. Louttit =

American politician

Tom Louttit

Member of the California State Assembly from the 20th district
- In office January 5, 1925 - January 3, 1927
- Preceded by: George A. Dean
- Succeeded by: Forsythe Charles Clowdsley

Personal details
- Born: December 13, 1898 California
- Died: September 19, 1967 (aged 68) Stockton, California
- Party: Republican
- Spouse: Carolyn L.
- Children: 1

Military service
- Branch/service: United States Army
- Battles/wars: World War I

Tom Hunter Louttit (December 13, 1898 – September 19, 1967) served in the California State Assembly for the 20th district from 1925 to 1927. During World War I he also served in the United States Army.
