= Louttit Laundry =

- U.S. National Register of Historic Places
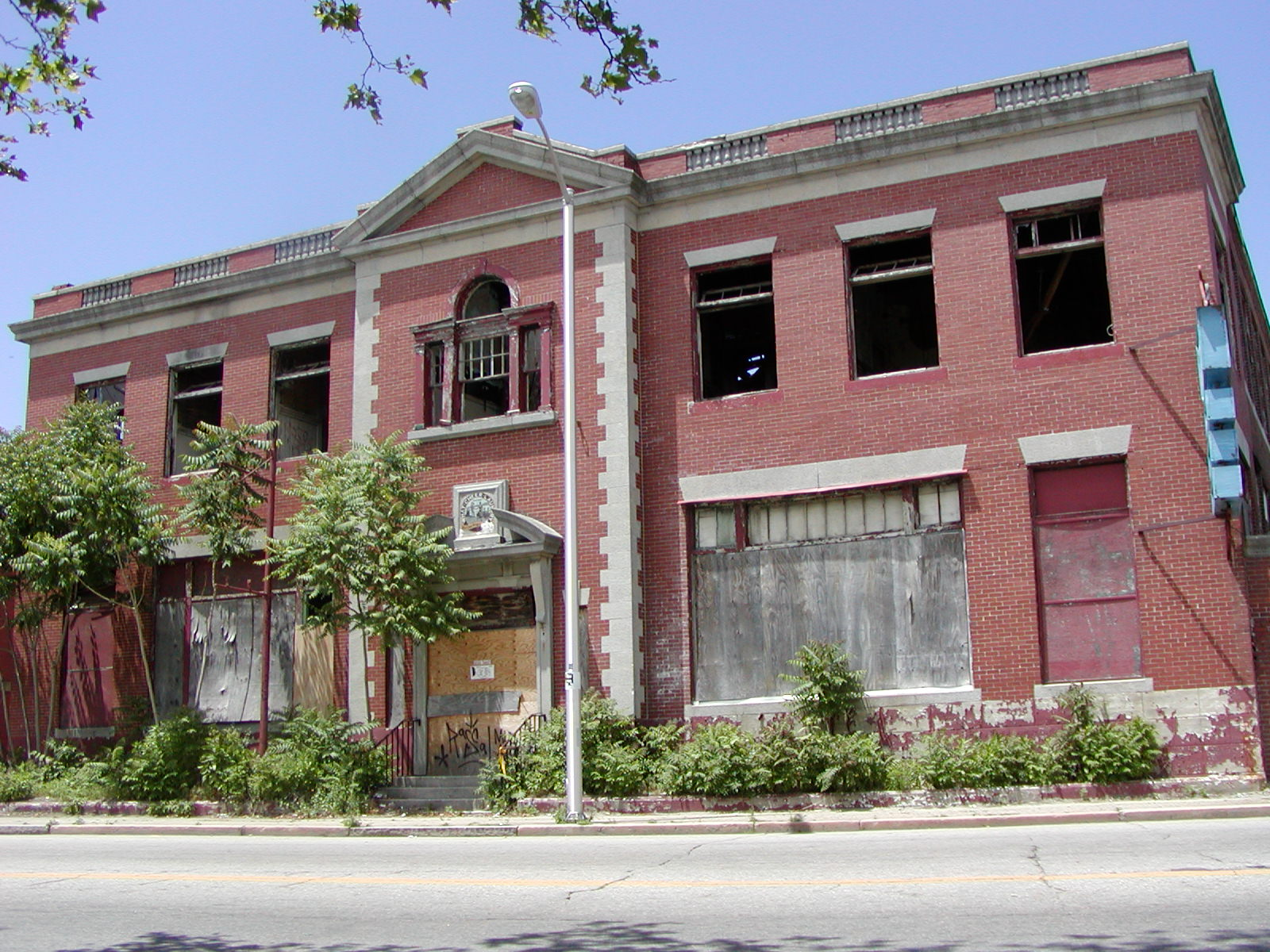
- Louttit Laundry southern facade, April 2002, looking west northwest

- Location within Rhode Island Location within the United States
- Location: Providence, Rhode Island
- Coordinates: 41°49′4″N 71°25′27″W
- Built: 1906, 1925
- Architectural style: Georgian Revival
- Demolished: 2008
- NRHP reference No.: 04000197
- Added to NRHP: March 18, 2004

Louttit Laundry was at one time the largest laundry business in Rhode Island, with 150 employees and 16 outlets throughout the state. Their historic building at 93 Cranston Street (previously home to What Cheer Steam Laundry) was on the National Register of Historic Places. The company was sold in 1985 and closed in 1987. The Cranston Street building was built in 1906, expanded in 1925, damaged by fire in 2001, and demolished in 2008.

== History ==
William Louttit's Home Hand Laundry was established in 1896 by William E. Louttit. His business grew rapidly. A receipt from 1912 shows Louttit locations added in 1897, 1899, 1902, and operating "today" out of 307 Broad Street. The receipt lists a "downtown office" address in the Howard Building at 171 Westminster Street.

== Building at 93 Cranston Street ==
The main building was a long two-story brick structure with modest Georgian Colonial Revival styling built in 1906, with an office block at one end, added in 1925. Its frontispiece featured a "projecting pedimented entrance."

Louttit moved to the 93 Cranston Street location in 1918, where the What Cheer Laundry (purchased by Loutitt) had operated since 1901. Loutitt operated from a 1906 building built by the What Cheer proprietors, and expanded in 1925 with the construction of this larger facility. At that time, Louttit was the largest laundry facility in Rhode Island, with over 150 employees and 16 locations. The building complex was sold in 1985 for 1.2 million dollars, and it closed two years later. A fire in 2001 destroyed most of the original 1906 building, leaving only the 1925 building standing.

The ground under the lot was contaminated over the years with cleaning chemicals and heating oil, requiring an extensive cleanup before the land could be used again. In 2005, the city received a $200,000 grant from the Environmental Protection Agency for a cleanup.

The building sat vacant from 1987 to 2008 and appeared on preservationist lists several times. The city foreclosed on the property in 1999.

Unfortunately, the soil contamination was judged so bad that the only way to clean up the site would be to take down the building. Even efforts to keep Cranston Street Façade intact were decided in the end to be impractical. The city's Historic District Commission gave permission for demolition in October 2007, and in December 2008 the entire structure was demolished by the J.R. Vinagro Corp.

The lot is now home to Urban Greens, a food co-op, and a sustainably built apartment complex.

== Preservation efforts ==
In an effort to attract attention to the site, the Providence Preservation Society listed the site on their Most Endangered List seven times, as well as listing it on the National Register of Historic Places in 2004.

== Gallery ==
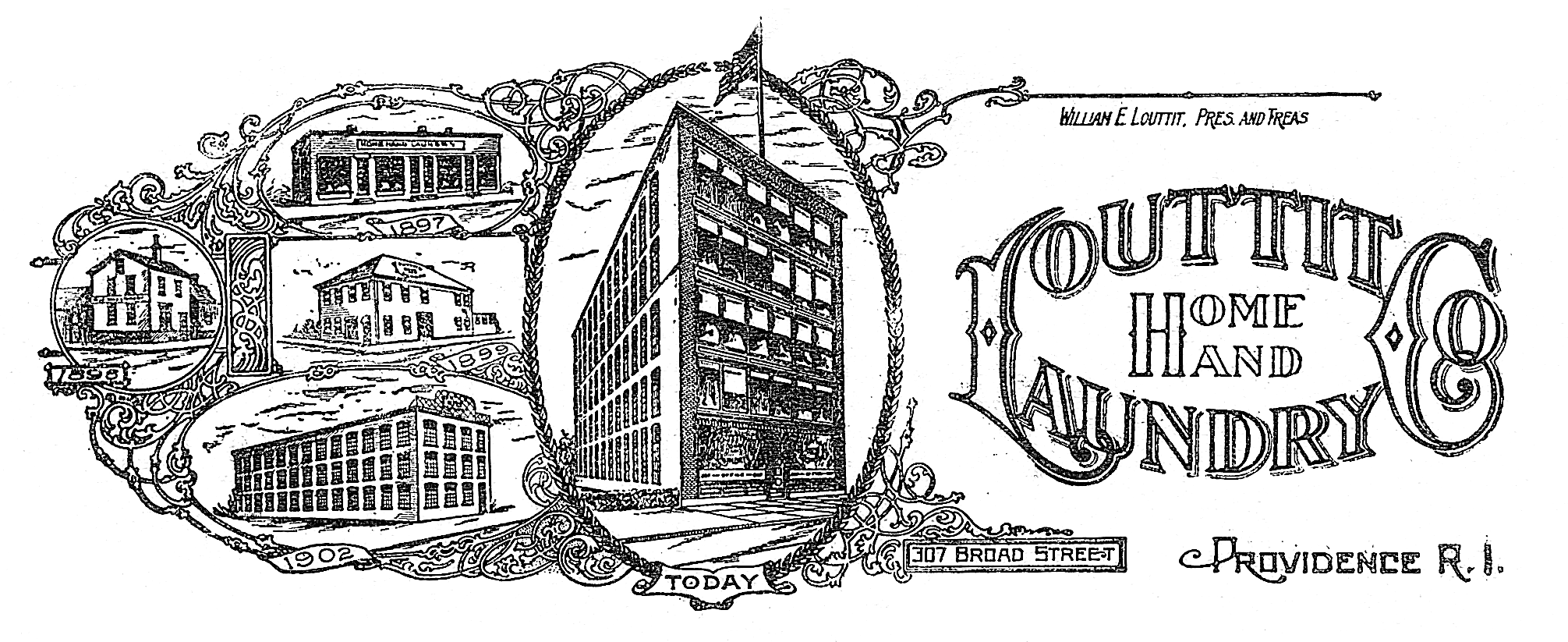
Receipt masthead of Louttit Laundry

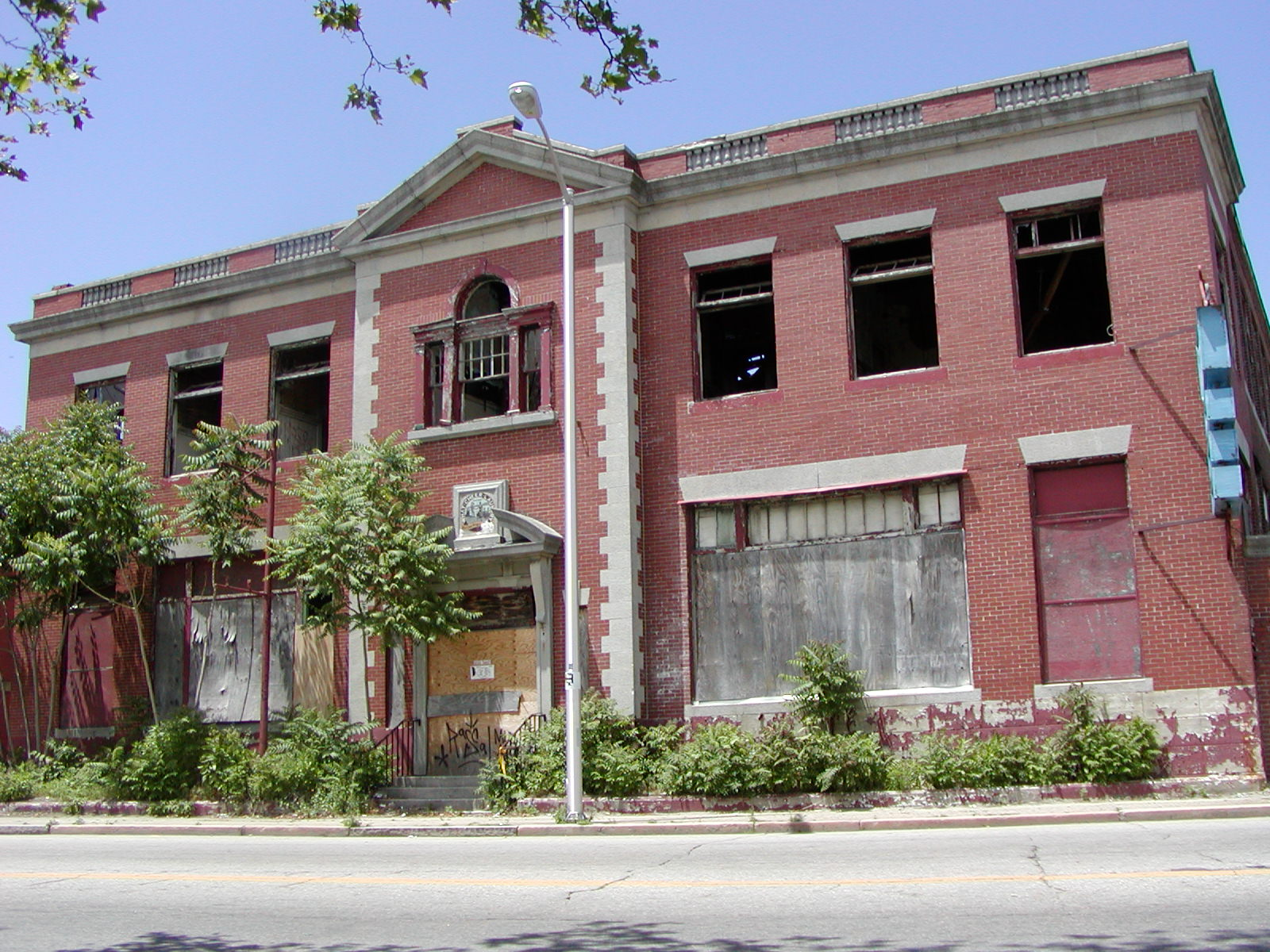
Southern façade of Louttit Laundry, 2002

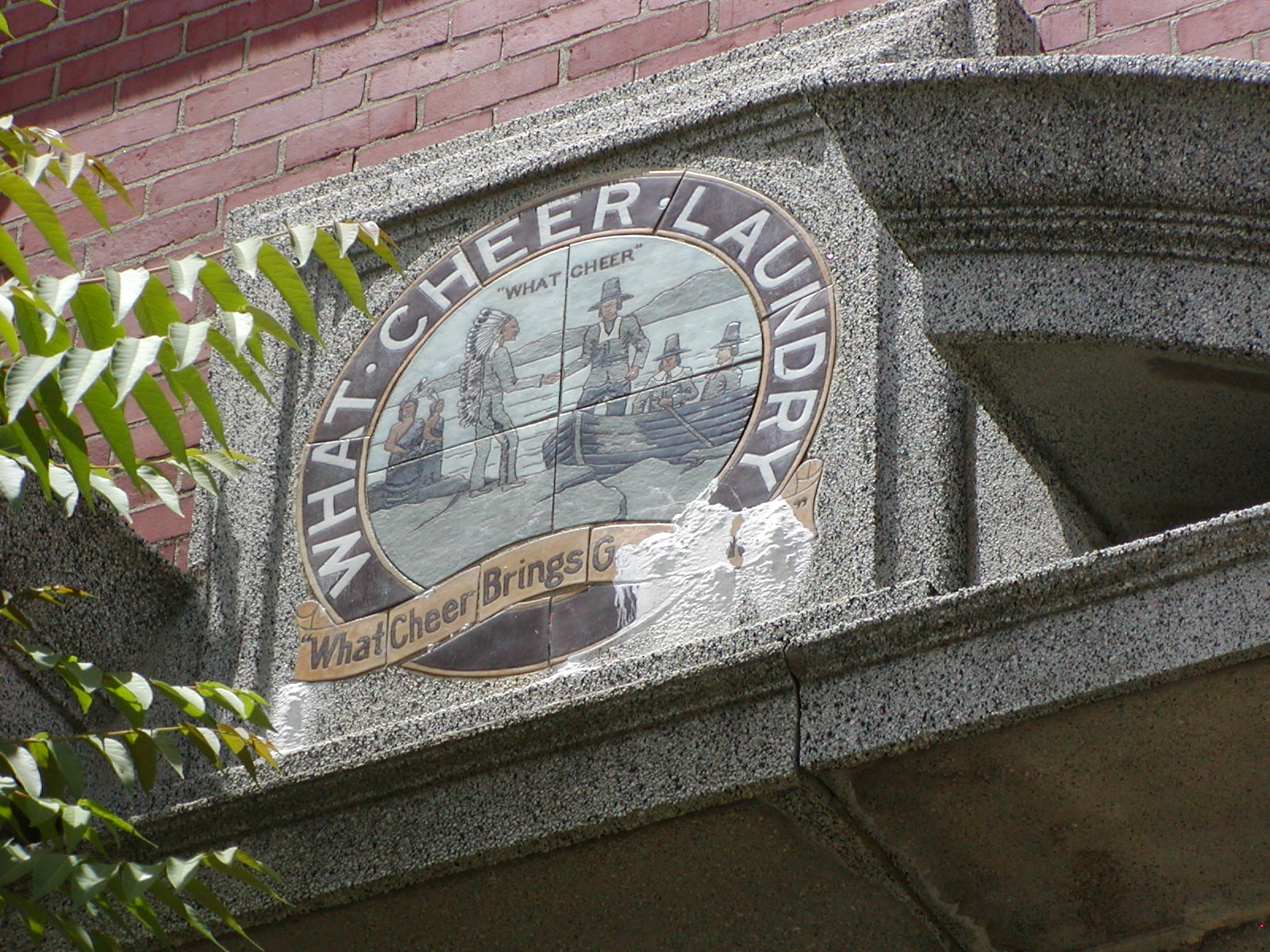
Detail of medallion above main entrance, 2002

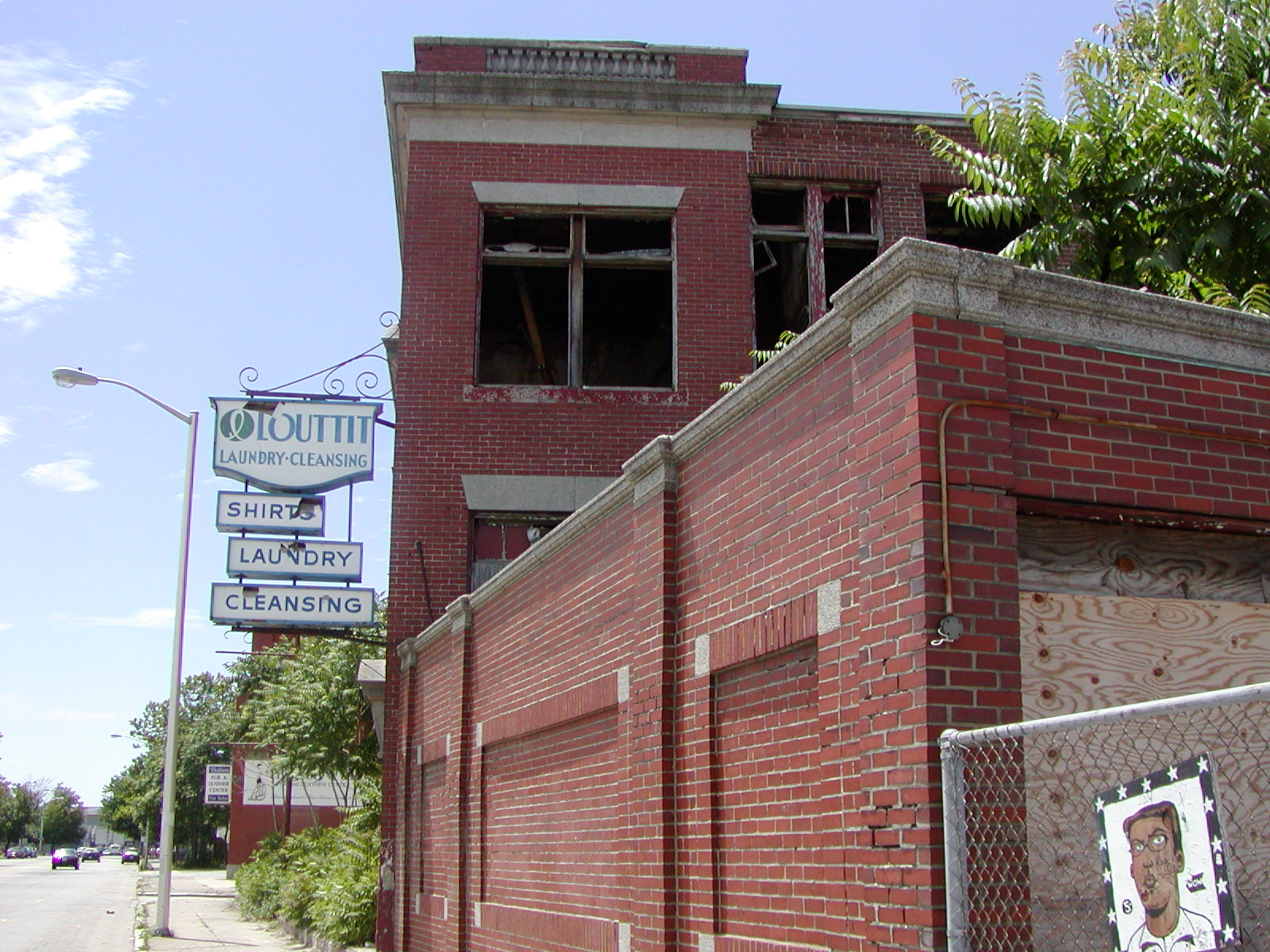
Sign details along Cranston Street, 2002

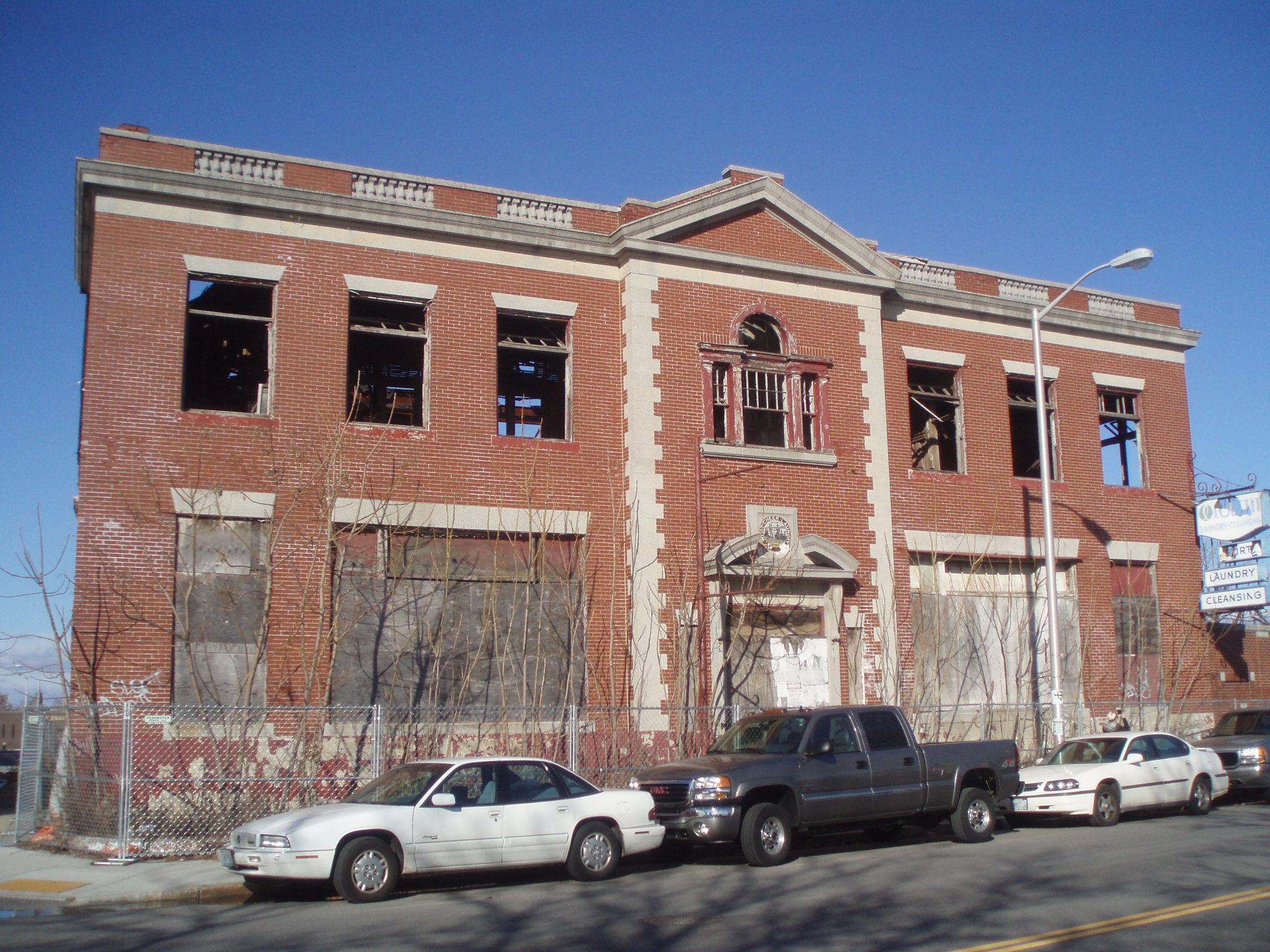
Facade along Cranston St in 2008

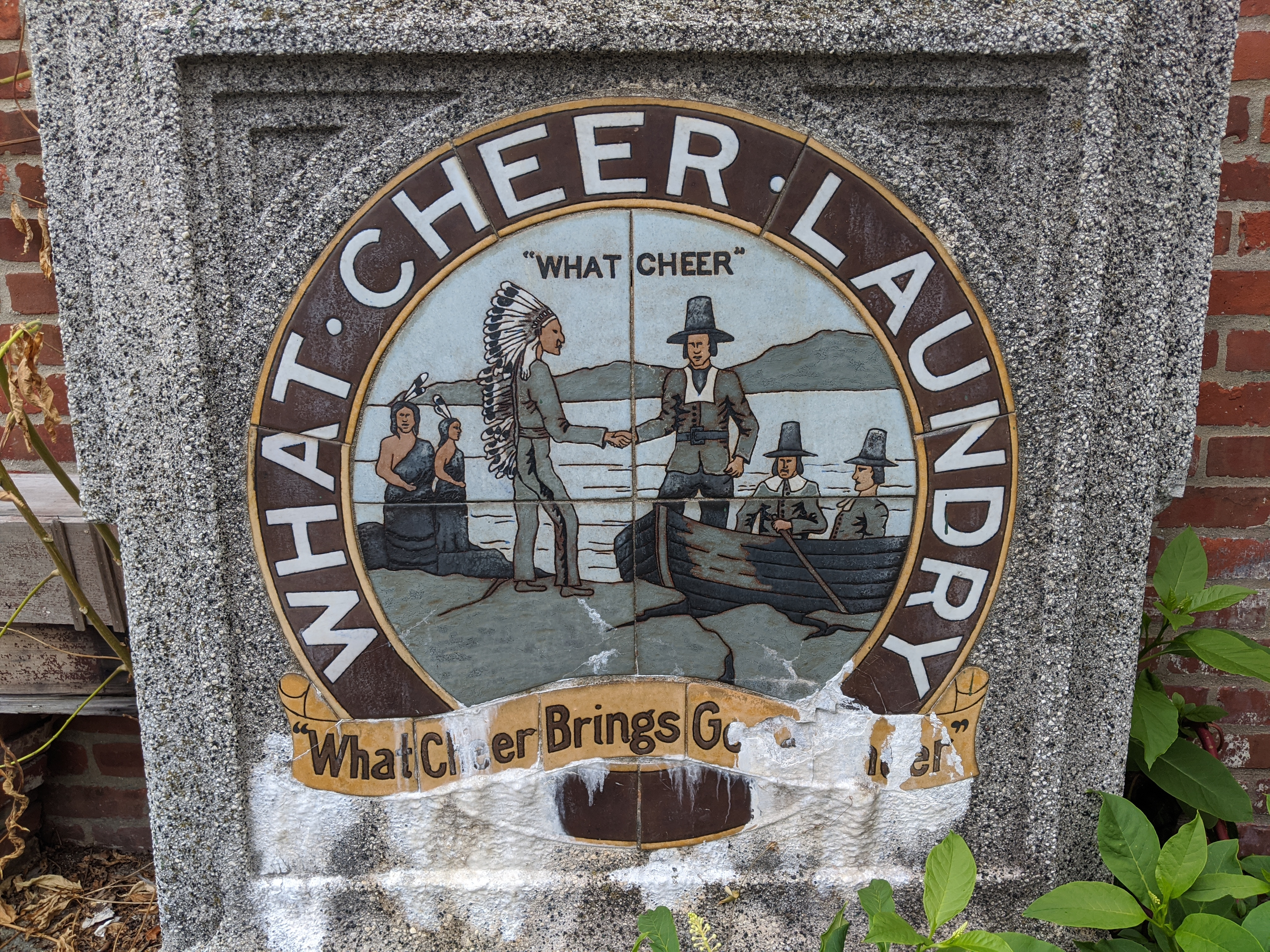
Saved medallion of the former What Cheer Laundry

== See also ==
- National Register of Historic Places listings in Providence, Rhode Island
