= Jason Loutitt =

Canadian long-distance runner

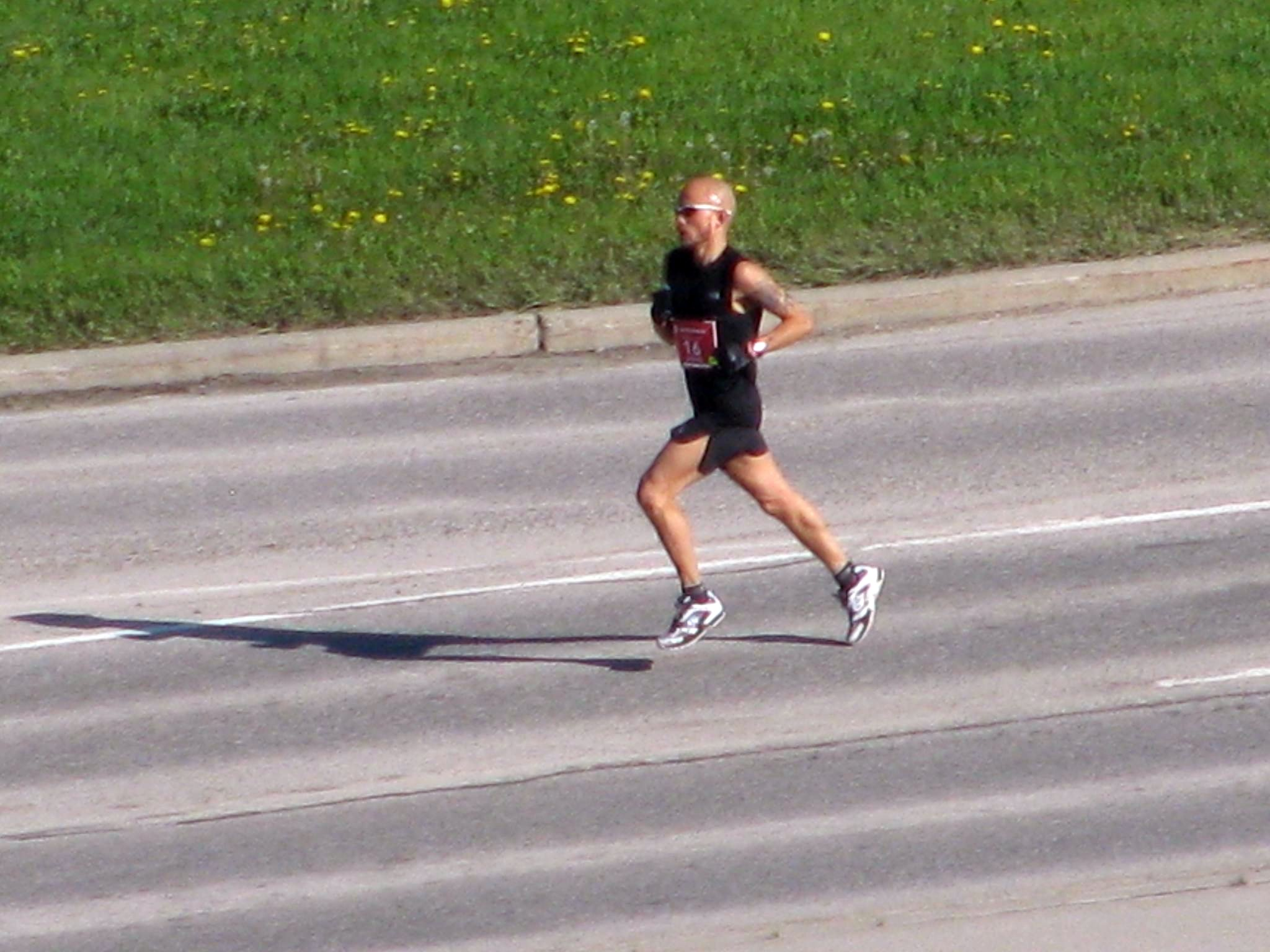
- Jason Loutitt at 2011 Calgary Marathon
- Born: April 26, 1974; Trail, British Columbia, Canada
- Died: June 7, 2021 (aged 47); Squamish, British Columbia, Canada
- Occupations: Long-distance Runner & Cyclist

Jason Loutitt (April 26, 1974 – June 7, 2021) was a Canadian marathon and long-distance mountain runner and cyclist from Squamish, British Columbia. Loutitt was the recipient of the Tom Longboat Award in 2001.

== Personal life ==
Loutitt ran the Service Canada office in Squamish, then moved on to working Aboriginal programs in Vancouver. Loutitt left work to focus on running and training, he was also an Aboriginal role model and motivational speaker.

On June 19. 2020, Loutitt set out from Whistler, British Columbia for Winnipeg, Manitoba by bike to raise funds for Squamish Helping Hands Society's Under One Roof program. He planned to ride to the Canadian Museum for Human Rights in Manitoba's capital and then return.

After reaching Winnipeg, he decided to continue across Canada to Halifax, and reached it July 11 - in just over 21 days. He returned to Whistler on August 30, 2020, completing the coast to coast return trip in just 44 days.

== Athletic career ==
Loutitt ran his first race in the Columbia Icefields in 1999, in the relay portion for 2PPCLI Infantry.

Loutitt was honoured as a Tom Longboat Award recipient in 2001. The Tom Longboat Awards were created in 1951 to honour Aboriginal athletes for their "outstanding contributions to sport in Canada". Loutitt was a Tom Longboat Award recipient for his success in ultra-distance running, including wins in the Calgary Marathon in May 2011, the HURT 100 mile endurance race in Hawaii, and the Bear Mountain 10k in 2011, which is regarded as "Canada's Hardest 10K" race. Loutitt also had runner-up finishes in the Vancouver Marathon in 2010, as well as in the World Ultra Trail Running Championships in Ireland in July 2011.
