= Roy J. Nielsen =

American politician

Roy Nielsen
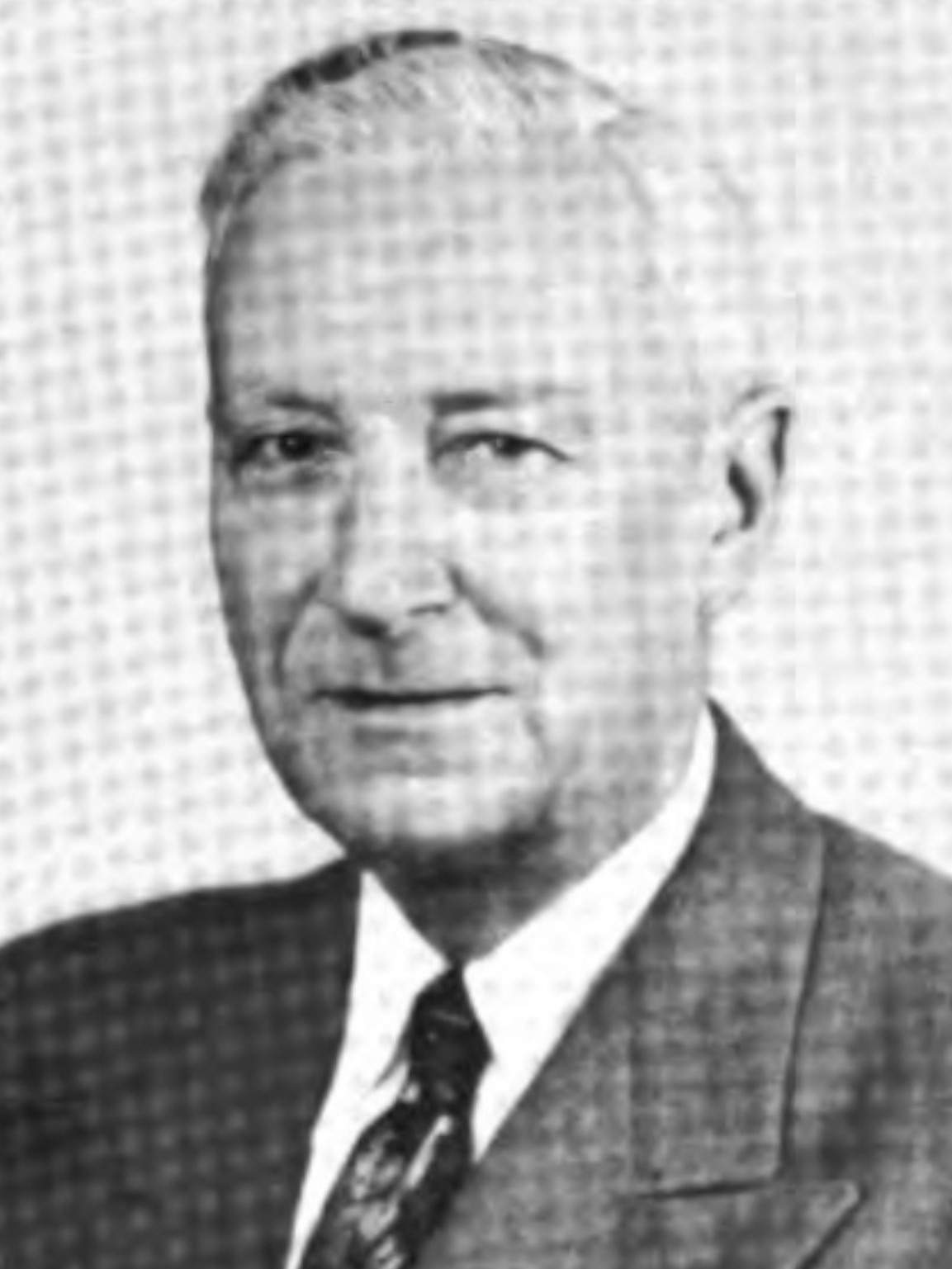

Member of the California State Assembly from the 9th district
- In office January 5, 1953 – January 5, 1959
- Preceded by: John E. Moss
- Succeeded by: Edwin L. Z'berg

Member of the California Senate from the 19th district
- In office January 4, 1937 – January 6, 1941
- Preceded by: Thomas P. Scollan
- Succeeded by: John Harold Swan

Member of the California State Assembly from the 8th district
- In office January 2, 1933 – January 4, 1937
- Preceded by: Frank L. Gordon
- Succeeded by: Chester M. Gannon

Member of the California State Assembly from the 11th district
- In office January 5, 1931 – January 2, 1933
- Preceded by: Frank Coombs
- Succeeded by: Forsythe Charles Clowdsley

Member of the California State Assembly from the 14th district
- In office January 5, 1925 – January 5, 1931
- Preceded by: John W. Johnston
- Succeeded by: Frank S. Israel

Personal details
- Born: November 9, 1886 Sacramento, California
- Died: August 12, 1964 (aged 77) Sacramento, California
- Party: Republican
- Spouse: Teresa A. Van Der Beets (m. 1933)

Military service
- Branch/service: United States Army
- Battles/wars: World War I

Roy J. Nielsen (November 9, 1886 – August 12, 1964) served in the California State Assembly and Senate. Nielsen served in the 14th, 11th, 8th and 9th Assembly districts and served in the 19th Senate district. From 1942 to 1952, he served as Sacramento City Council. During World War I he also served in the United States Army.
