= 1874–1875 state visit by Kalākaua to the United States =

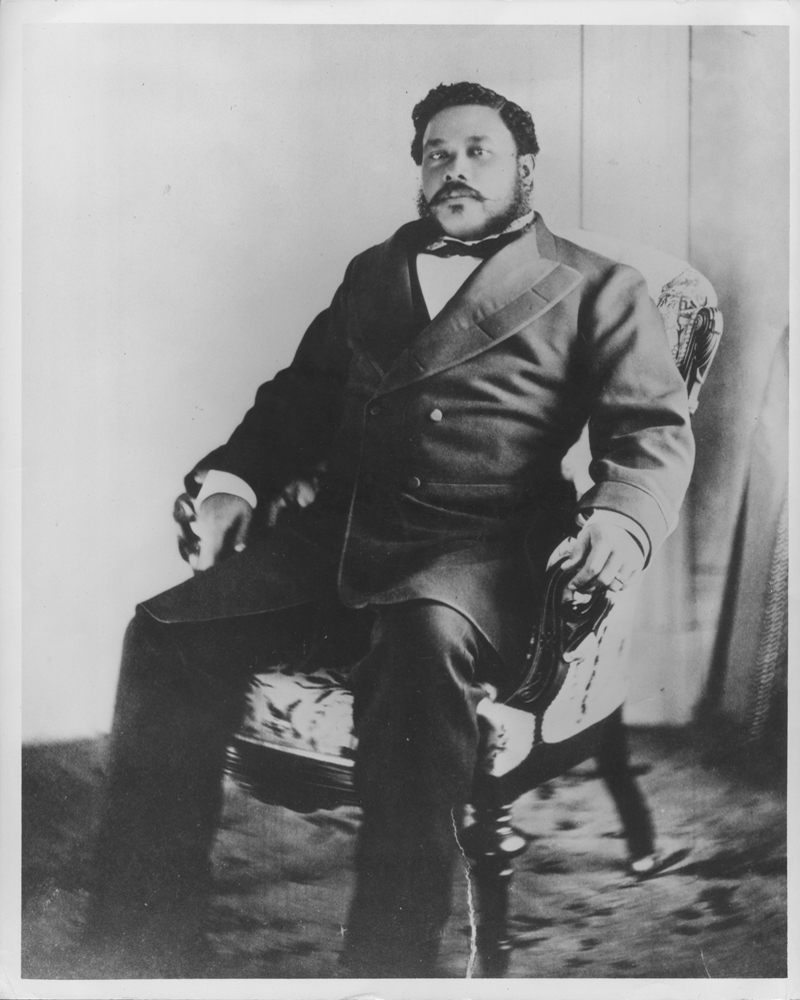
Formal portrait of Kalākaua at the White House, 1874

King Kalākaua of the Hawaiian Kingdom made a state visit to the United States during the period November 28, 1874, through February 3, 1875. Authorized by the legislature of Hawaii, the purpose of the visit was for the ratification of the reciprocity treaty. The 91-day round-trip journey across the United States began in Honolulu on November 17, 1874, and was completed on February 15, 1875. His arrival at San Francisco on November 28, made him the first reigning monarch of any nation to set foot in the United States. Upon his arrival in Washington, D.C., the United States Congress held the first joint meeting in the body's history, less formal than a joint session, to receive him. US President Ulysses S. Grant hosted him as honoree of the first state dinner at the White House.

A career politician who rose through the ranks of chiefs, Kalākaua had previously been to California and Canada with Prince Lot in 1860 as a 23-year-old government bureaucrat, more than a dozen years away from his accession to the throne. In 1874, the Hawaiian government sent him to Washington, D.C., this time to seek the elimination of tariffs on the kingdom's sugar exports, after previous attempts had failed. There had been concerns about Kalākaua's willingness to make the journey; however, after putting Elisha Hunt Allen in charge of the negotiations, he sailed for San Francisco, and journeyed across the United States by rail. He was well-received by government officials on federal, state and local levels, and accorded respect as a commander-in-chief by military representatives.

Although ill with a viral infection throughout much of his trip, the king accommodated the relentless attention of being in the spotlight across America. He accorded journalist requests for interviews, and interacted with the general public, shaking hands and signing autographs, while crowds of curiosity seekers grew with each stop. Anticipation had grown so strong by the time he reached Washington, D.C., that spectators gathered on rooftops to watch him pass by. Goodwill generated by Kalākaua is credited for doing much to help move legislation for the Reciprocity Treaty of 1875 through the necessary channels. The resulting close economic ties between the Hawaiian islands and the United States became a major factor leading to the overthrow of the Hawaiian Kingdom in 1893.

== Background ==
Kalākaua was a career politician who rose through the ranks of chiefs, and was named by Kamehameha III in 1844 as eligible to be king. Kamehameha V, the last of the Kamehameha dynasty, died on December 12, 1872, without naming a successor to the throne. Under the 1864 Constitution of the Hawaiian Kingdom, if the king did not appoint a successor, a new king would be elected by the legislature to start a new royal line of succession. Lunalilo became the first elected monarch of Hawaii, with Kalākaua holding the rank of Colonel on the royal military staff. Upon Lunalilo's death on February 3, 1874, a legislative election was held, with Kalākaua being sworn in as monarch on February 13. Two weeks after taking office, he reorganized the Hawaiian military and restored the Household Guards recently abolished by Lunalilo. Like his predecessors, he belonged to fraternal organizations, as a member of the freemasonry Lodge Le Progres de l'Oceanie, and as the founding member of the Ancient Order of Foresters in Hawaii.

When Kalākaua embarked on his state visit to the United States, nine months after being elected, he was the first reigning monarch to visit America, but not the first member of Hawaii's royal family to do so. He was the second reigning Hawaiian monarch to travel abroad, having been preceded in 1824 by King Kamehameha II and Queen Kamāmalu, who had traveled to the United Kingdom via the Strait of Magellan, both of them dying of measles while in London. Prior to either of their accessions, brothers Prince Liholiho (Kamehameha IV) and Prince Lot (Kamehameha V) had accompanied Dr. Gerrit P. Judd on a year-long diplomatic mission, from September 11, 1849, to September 9, 1850. Judd's mission took them to San Francisco, Panama, Jamaica, New York, London and Paris. Kamehameha IV's widow Queen Emma had visited New York and San Francisco in 1866 on her return from a personal visit to England and France.

Kalākaua had previously visited the United States in late 1860, when he was chief clerk of the kingdom's Department of the Interior. On that trip, he had accompanied Minister of the Interior Prince Lot, high chief Levi Haʻalelea, and Hawaii's Consul for Peru Josiah C. Spalding on a two-month tour of British Columbia and California.

== The quest for tariff easement ==
Since the days of visits by whaling ships, and the arrival of the first missionaries in 1820, Hawaii became increasingly populated by non-residents operating within the kingdom's business community. Many of them became friends and advisors to the monarchy. The Alien Land Ownership Act was written by American attorney William Little Lee who arrived in Hawaii only a year before being appointed Land Commissioner. The Act, passed by the legislature of the Hawaiian Kingdom on July 10, 1850, allowed non-residents to own Hawaiian land.

During the reign of Kamehameha III, sugar production in Hawaii became a successful enterprise, with sugar refineries in Oregon and California as the primary customers, and the kingdom looking to expand its market, but being increasingly hampered by tariffs on their product. The kingdom also had strong economic ties to the United Kingdom. Queen Emma was descended from a British subject, and Queen Victoria had been the godmother of Emma's son Prince Albert Kamehameha. Anglo-American planters operated tariff-free within their own customer bases. In the latter half of the 19th century, the sugar trade had become a booming industry, but import taxes severely dampened Hawaii as a viable economic competitor.

Hawaii's sugar planters had worked for decades with the legislature of the Hawaiian Kingdom to find a viable remedy to the global market impingement on their profits caused by the tariffs. Solutions debated were tariff reciprocity treaties, annexation of Hawaii by the United States, formal alliances with other countries, and the cession of Pearl Harbor. An 1854 treaty for Hawaii's annexation to the United States was submitted to Kamehameha III, but he never signed it. In 1867, a proposed reciprocity treaty got as far as the United States Congress, but was defeated in the Senate. An aborted 1873 effort to offer Pearl Harbor in return for tariff reciprocity was heavily favored by American owners of Hawaiian plantations. Strong opposition came from Kalākaua and other leaders among the Hawaiian people.

The reciprocity treaty, giving away land, is much discussed these days . . . There is a feeling of bitterness against these rude people who dwell on our land and have high handed ideas of giving away somebody else's property as if it was theirs.

— Queen Emma

On August 1, 1874, Hawaii's legislature authorized Kalākaua to ratify a reciprocity treaty in Washington, DC There was speculation that he was lukewarm on the idea. Diplomat Henry A. Peirce, who was serving as the United States Minister to Hawaii, stated, "I don't think the King cares much about the Treaty, but he hopes, as we Americans say, 'to have a good time' generally." The king actually supported the idea of a reciprocity treaty, just not one that ceded Hawaiian land, and he did not want Hawaii to appear to be favoring a single nation. Concern arose that his absence might trigger a hostile takeover of the kingdom by a foreign power. After consulting with his privy council, he agreed to accompany the diplomatic team, but rather than being involved in the negotiations himself, Kalākaua appointed Hawaiian Kingdom Minister to the United States Elisha Hunt Allen to take charge.

After exchanges between Peirce and Secretary of State Hamilton Fish, the US government extended a formal invitation to the king for a state visit and placed the man-of-war ship USS Benicia at his disposal. The king would leave the negotiating to his appointed commission, and focused his own efforts on building goodwill between the two nations, raising the island nation's visibility with visits to government leaders across the United States. On October 18, Minister Allen and Privy Councilor Henry A. P. Carter, of C. Brewer & Co., sailed for the United States. The members of the reciprocity commission who traveled with the king included Peirce, Oahu Governor John Owen Dominis, husband of Kalākaua's sister Liliʻuokalani, and Maui Governor John Mākini Kapena, a full-blood Hawaiian who supported a reciprocity treaty but who, during the reign of Lunalilo, had spoken out against cession of Hawaiian territory.

== Departing Hawaii (November 14–17, 1874) ==
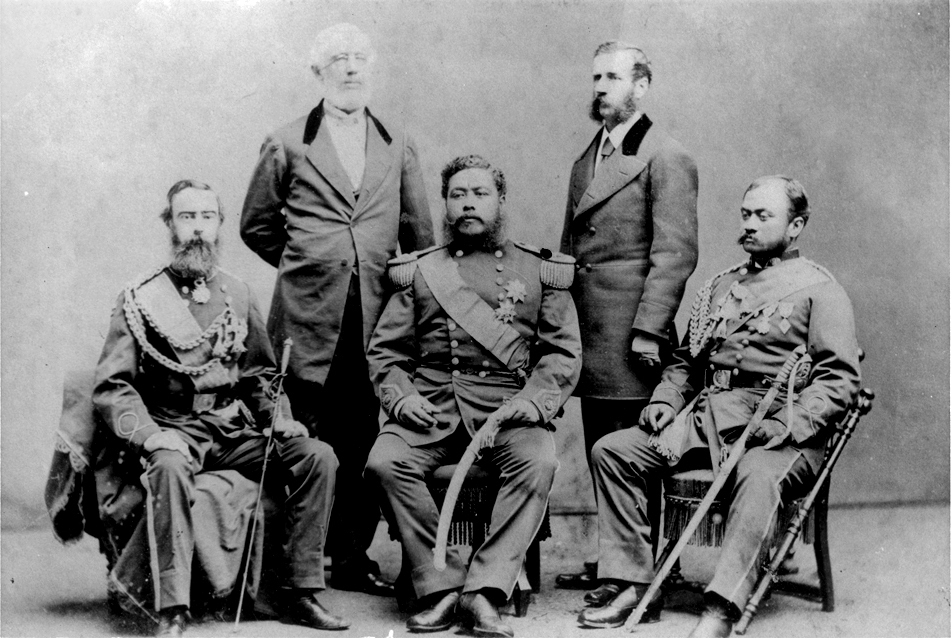
King Kalākaua and members of the Reciprocity Commission: John Owen Dominis, Governor of Oahu; Henry A. Peirce, the presiding US Commissioner to Hawaii; Kalākaua; Henry W. Severance, the Hawaiian Consul in San Francisco, and John M. Kapena, Governor of Maui.

At ʻIolani Palace on November 14, the doors were opened to native Hawaiians for a traditional "hoʻokupu", a ceremonial giving of gifts to the king prior to his departure. Kalākaua appointed his brother Leleiohoku II to act as regent during his absence. Likewise, Dominis appointed William F. Allen as acting governor of Oahu, and Kapena appointed Luther Aholo acting governor of Maui. Minister of the Interior William Luther Moehonua closed all government offices on November 16, as a public day of thanksgiving on Kalākaua's 38th birthday.

Celebration of the king's birthday began with morning services by various Christian denominations, extolling the historical significance of the upcoming visit. Salutes were fired from the three foreign warships in Honolulu Harbor. At the commencement of the morning service at Kawaiahaʻo, the king and members of the royal family entered the church around noon to address the assembled crowds. Rev. Moses Kuaea, of the Kaumakapili Church, offered a prayer, praised the king's efforts to save the nation's agricultural interest, and asked for the people to pray for his safety during his upcoming trip. The church choir performed "God Save the King", "He Mele Lāhui Hawaiʻi", the national anthem written by Liliʻuokalani, and "Hawaiʻi Ponoʻī", composed by the king and Henri Berger. In his farewell address, Kalākaua stated: "... I believe that if such a Treaty can be secured, the beneficial effects will be soon apparent to all classes, and our nation, under its reviving influences, will grow again."

The royal party consisting of Kalākaua, his personal secretary E. M. Mayor, diplomat Peirce, governors Dominis and Kapena, and three or four servants departed Hawaii on the morning of November 17. The king was conveyed to the wharf on the personal carriage of Captain William E. Hopkins, of the Benicia. An estimated 3000 to 4000 well-wishers lined the wharf, and the crowds chanted Hawaiian mele, cheered, and wailed at the occasion of the king's leaving. The Hawaiian royal standard was unfurled and salutes fired from the ship as the king and his party boarded and sailed east.

== San Francisco (November 28 – December 5, 1874) ==
Map of Kalākaua's journey across the United States, 1874–75

Flying the Hawaiian royal standard, the ship docked in San Francisco the evening of November 28. A formal reception by local dignitaries, along with a 21-gun salute from the Alcatraz Citadel, took place the next morning. They were joined on board by Edward C. Macfarlane, General John Schofield and his chief of staff, William M. Wherry, and Hawaiian Consul for California Henry W. Severance. San Francisco mayor James Otis, members of the First Regiment National Guard, and the Presidio Band playing "He Mele Lahui Hawaii", escorted all to their suite at the Grand Hotel.

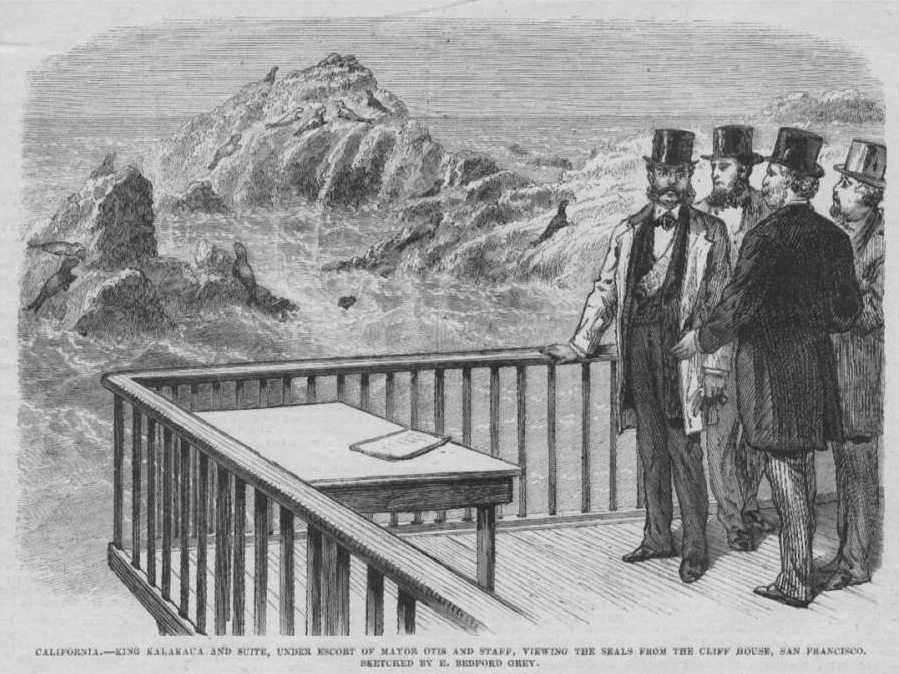
Kalākaua and his entourage with Mayor James Otis and staff viewing seals on Seal Rock from Cliff House, San Francisco, 1874

During the king's week-long stay in San Francisco, the city absorbed all costs. Consul Severance acted as the royal greeter for the in-suite November 30 public reception. The following morning, Severance and the king's entourage sat for a portrait at the Bradley and Rulofson photograph gallery. Celso Caesar Moreno, who would later serve in the king's cabinet, presented himself as owner of three telegraph cable charter companies, regaling Kalākaua with his tales of global adventures.

The king made inspections of the military operations at Alcatraz Island and Mare Island Naval Shipyard on December 2, prior to relaxing at a private men's club. His appearances began to draw spectators, as he accompanied Japanese Minister Yoshida Kiyonari and Japanese Consul Charles Wolcott Brooks to the San Francisco Board of Brokers (predecessor to the San Francisco Stock and Bond Exchange) on December 3, followed by an afternoon at Woodward's Gardens.

On December 4, the king visited the San Francisco Mint, and the Western Union Telegraph office, where he wired greetings to President Ulysses S. Grant and Chicago Mayor Harvey Doolittle Colvin, receiving an immediate reply from Grant. He sat for a portrait by photographer Thomas Houseworth, and granted a parting interview to the San Francisco Chronicle.

San Francisco's enthusiastic reception for the dark-skinned monarch was less than a decade after the American Civil War had divided the nation over the issue of enslavement of persons of color. Giving non-white people equal access to public accommodations would be fought through legislatures and courts for years to come. The African-American newspaper Pacific Appeal noted the irony and speculated, "... there has either been a sudden abandonment of colorphobia prejudice, or an extraordinary amount of toadyism to a crown head by the San Francisco American people."

The royal party boarded three private cars provided by the rail company on December 5, and began their trip across the continent. In addition to Dominis, Kapena, Mayor and Peirce, the king's official party now included Schofield, Wherry, and Lieutenant Commander William H. Whiting, a junior officer of the Benicia. From that point forward, writer Joseph Irwin accompanied the royal party as an embedded journalist for The Daily Alta California.

== Train trip across America (December 5–11, 1874) ==
The train passed through Sacramento, then through Nevada, by way of Winnemucca, Battle Mountain and Elko. They continued through Ogden, Territory of Utah to Fort Bridger, Territory of Wyoming, where they were entertained by the 4th Infantry Division band. Their train stopped at the Laramie depot on December 8 for a reception at the Railroad Hotel in Cheyenne, hosted by Governor John Allen Campbell. Among the dignitaries at the hotel were associate justice of the Supreme Court of the Territory of Wyoming Joseph M. Carey, and Colonel Thaddeus H. Stanton.

In Omaha, the train was met at the depot by an estimated 5,000 people, and accorded a 20-gun salute under the direction of General Edward Ord. They remained long enough for Mayor Champion S. Chase and the Omaha City Council to give them a personal tour of the city. At Aurora, Illinois, a boisterous crowd cheered as the train passed through their town on its way to Chicago.

During a late-night layover in Chicago on December 10, the king's cars were switched over to another line going east. On December 11, just after midnight, the train pulled through Fort Wayne, Indiana, and reporters from The Fort Wayne Sentinel boarded in hopes of being granted an audience. In spite of the king already being in bed, he tolerated being interrupted from his sleep to be interviewed.

== Washington, DC (December 12–22, 1874) ==
... men, women and children, all anxious to catch a glimpse of the first reigning King ever on our shores. Every window seemed to be filled with anxious spectators, and the house tops were covered with people. The appearance of the street could only remind one familiar with such scenes of an inauguration day.

— National Republican

When the train carrying Kalākaua arrived in Washington, D.C., on December 12, it was met at the station by treaty negotiator Minister Allen. The king's car was boarded by Secretary of State Hamilton Fish, Secretary of the Navy George M. Robeson, and Secretary of War William W. Belknap. Journalists on hand represented the New-York Tribune, the New York Times, the New York Telegram, the New York Star, the Baltimore Press Association, and The Republican. After a champagne reception, a United States Marines battalion and the Marine Corps Band escorted them past massive crowds lining B Street and Pennsylvania Avenue to the Arlington Hotel.

Kalākaua had become ill with a head cold on the trip and was being attended by a US Navy physician, when a message arrived from President Ulysses S. Grant, inviting him to be the guest of honor at a White House state dinner. Visitors to his suite were received by the other members of his entourage, and the White House state dinner was postponed.

=== Joint meeting of Congress (December 18) ===
On December 18, Kalākaua was the first person in history received by the United States Congress in a joint meeting, in this case occurring in the President's Room of the United States Senate. This differs from a joint session of Congress, for which the United States Constitution requires a joint resolution, and is often used for formal addresses. Joint meetings of Congress are rare, and another one was not called until the 1900 Centennial of the Capital City.

The king was escorted in by Senator Simon Cameron, Chairman of the Senate Committee on Foreign Relations, and Representative Godlove Stein Orth, Chairman of the House Committee on Foreign Affairs. He was formally welcomed by a short speech from Speaker of the United States House of Representatives Michael C. Kerr. Kalākaua's illness had hindered his ability to deliver an oration. Minister Allen instead read prepared remarks expressing the king's thanks for their hospitality, and hopes for continued favorable relations between their nations. He met privately with Massachusetts senator William B. Washburn, who extended an invitation from the American Board of Commission of Foreign Missionaries to visit them in Boston.

=== State dinner (December 22) ===
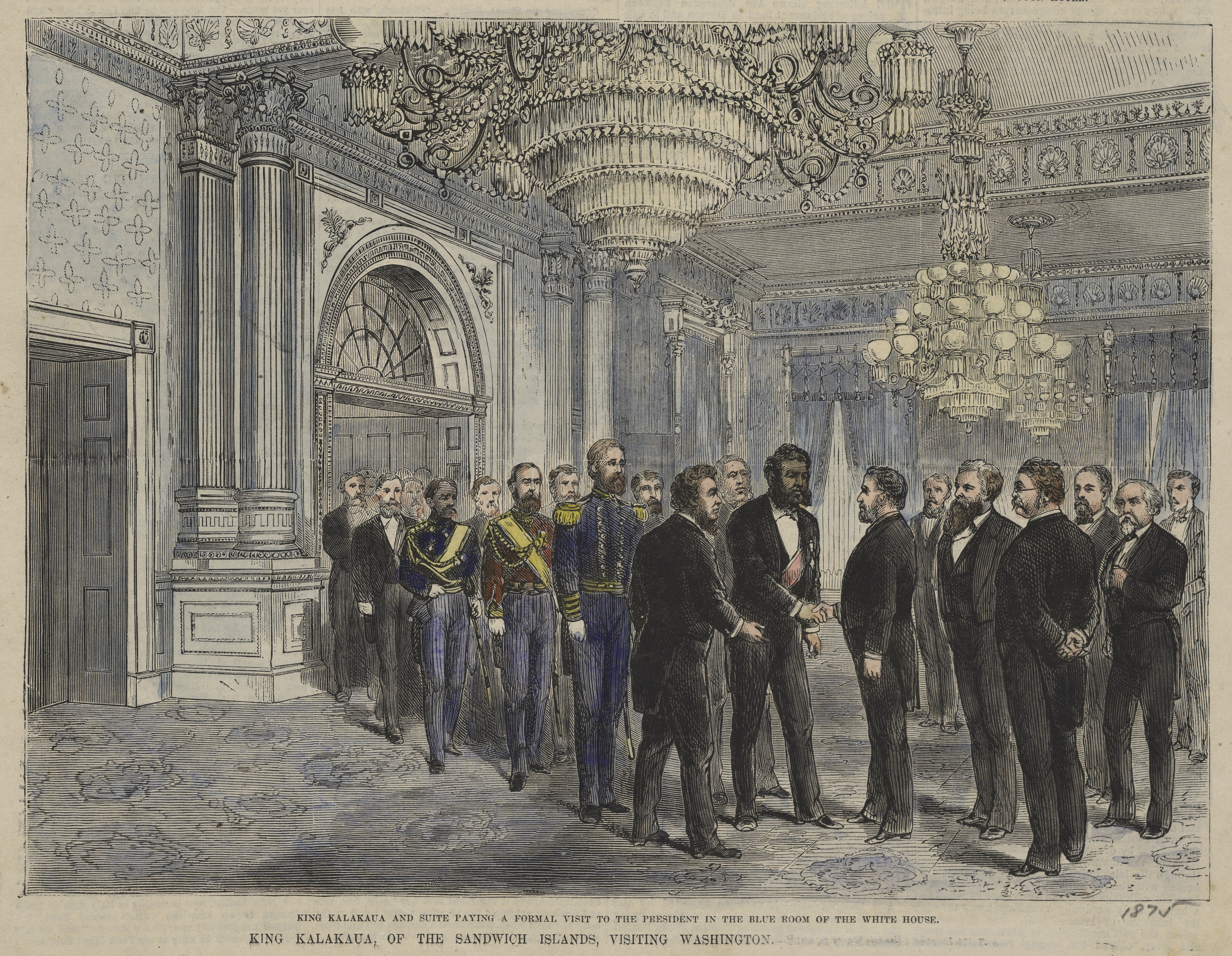
Illustration of Kalākaua's state dinner at the White House, meeting with President Ulysses S. Grant, from Frank Leslie's Illustrated Newspaper

President Grant initiated the White House state dinner tradition when he hosted the December 22 dinner to honor Kalākaua. Written invitations were sent out on December 19, for the 7–11 p.m. event. Dignitaries attending were:

- Vice President Henry Wilson
- Secretary of State and Mrs. Hamilton Fish
- Secretary of War William W. Belknap
- Secretary of the Navy George M. Robeson
- Secretary of the Treasury Benjamin H. Bristow
- Secretary of the Interior Columbus Delano
- Postmaster General and Mrs. Marshall Jewell
- Attorney General and Mrs. George Henry Williams
- Chief Justice and Mrs. Morrison Waite
- Senator Simon Cameron, Chairman of the Senate Committee on Foreign Relations
- Speaker of the House of Representatives and Mrs. James G. Blaine
- Representative Godlove Stein Orth, Chairman of the House Committee on Foreign Affairs
- Admiral and Mrs. David Dixon Porter
- Sir Edward Thornton, 2nd Count of Cacilhas (dean of the diplomatic corps) and Lady Thornton

Unable to attend, but also invited, was General William Tecumseh Sherman.

== Visit to the Northeast (December 23, 1874 – January 9, 1875) ==
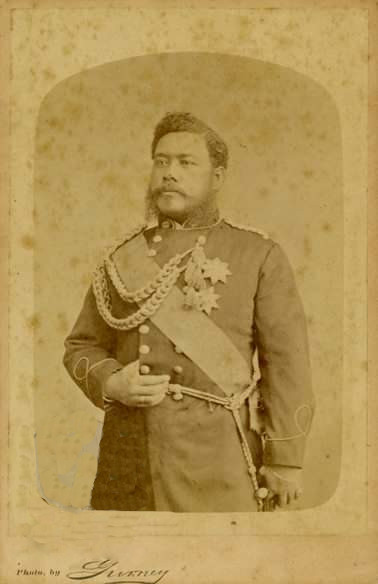
King Kalakaua, photograph taken in New York City on his return trip to Hawaii in December 1874.

=== New Jersey and New York (December 23–30, 1874) ===
Spectators lined the December 23 route, amassing at depots in Washington, D.C, Baltimore, Maryland, Wilmington, Delaware, West Philadelphia and stations through New Jersey. Guards foiled an attempted security breach at Trenton, as several men caught up in the frenzy of the moment tried to gain access to Kalākaua. The New York City council held a reception at the train depot, followed by a carriage ride past throngs of curiosity seekers en route to the Windsor Hotel.

During dinner with New York mayor Samuel B. H. Vance and city officials, they were entertained by a local musical band. On Christmas Eve, Kalākaua, Wherry and Dominis enjoyed a sleigh ride through Central Park. At an unannounced visit to the coed Normal School, they were given a tour of the facilities by its founder Thomas Hunter. The king's visit to the New York Stock Exchange created excitement among the brokers. Capping the day, they attended a performance of The Black Crook at the Grand Opera House. A Christmas Day observance at Saint Thomas Church was followed by a photo session at Jeremiah Gurney's studio.

Acknowledging the king's previous service as foreman of Hawaii Engine 4 in Honolulu, the New York City Fire Department took him on an inspection tour of nearby facilities on December 26. Kalākaua and staff donned their dress uniforms for a private in-suite presentation of Army and Navy officers, during which members of the Board of Trade were also introduced.

Kalākaua accepted an invitation to appear on December 29 at P. T. Barnum's Great Traveling World's Fair, Museum, Menagerie and Hippodrome. Barnum was the founder of Barnum & Bailey Circus, and had promoted the 1850–52 Jenny Lind tour of America. An advertisement for Kalākaua's appearance ran in the New-York Tribune, and Barnum would later remember the event's attendance record as 20,000. Barnum provided the royal party with bannered box seats to view the performances. For the finale, Barnum and Kalākaua rode the perimeter of the arena in an open carriage, as Kalākaua waved and tipped his hat to the cheering crowd.

The King immediately arose, and, amid tremendous cheering, he stepped into the carriage. I took a seat by his side, and he smilingly remarked, sotto voce: "We are all actors."

— P. T. Barnum

That evening, Kalākaua invited author Mark Twain to join the royal group in attending a stage production of Twain's 1873 novel The Gilded Age: A Tale of Today at New York's Park Theatre. The two had become acquainted in Hawaii in 1866 during the reign of Kamehameha V, when Twain was there as a reporter for the Sacramento Union. Unable to attend the play with the king, Twain invited Kalākaua to dine at his Connecticut home. The king was unable to accept the invitation, due to a prior commitment in New Haven.

On December 30, the New York masonic Lodge No. 330 held a reception at Doric Hall for their masonry brother Kalākaua.

=== New England (December 31, 1874 – January 9, 1875) ===
En route to Boston, they made a December 31 stopover in New Haven, Connecticut, home to Yale College. During a luncheon at New Haven City Hall, Kalākaua paid tribute to Yale's role in training many of the kingdom's leaders. Speeches from Connecticut governor Charles Roberts Ingersoll and New Haven mayor Henry Gould Lewis were followed by an official review of the New Haven Fire Department, a service at Center Church, and a visit to the home of Yale professor Chester Lyman, where the king signed autograph books and photos of himself. A banquet at the home of New Haven postmaster Nehemiah D. Sperry concluded the day's events.

New Bedford, Massachusetts, had been the point of origin for many whaling ships and missionaries sent to Hawaii. The day after stopping in New Haven, they accepted an invitation from New Bedford's mayor George B. Richmond to visit the town. Kalākaua obliged autograph seekers during his visit to the Potomaka Mills plant. A collation (religious fasting meal) for the king was hosted by Mayor George B. Richmond, and attended by nearly 100 master mariners who had visited Hawaii, the New Bedford City Guards and the Schouler Guards. At city hall, a large audience joined them for the playing of the Hawaiian national anthem. Before departure, the king shook hands with every individual. Dinner with 60 guests at the Parker House included the king's cousin Mary Pitman, and another autograph session.

On their January 2 arrival in Boston, the king indulged in a shopping trip, escorted by Massachusetts Lieutenant Governor Thomas Talbot and Governor-elect William Gaston. Kalākaua was a guest at the swearing-in ceremony for the second term of Mayor Samuel C. Cobb, who hosted a banquet for him at the Revere House. The royal party attended services at Park Street Church on Sunday. Kalākaua attended a legislative session of the Board of Aldermen and was the guest of honor at a joint reception by the United States Army and the United States Navy.

Over the next few days, they participated in a guided tour of select schools in Boston and visits to the Merchants Exchange and the Massachusetts General Court. He was escorted through an inspection tour of the newly completed Boston and Providence Railroad depot at Park Square. He sat for a photo session at the studio of James Wallace Black. A tour of the manufacturing district of Lowell, Massachusetts, was followed by a lunch with 150 guests, where he shook hands with many spectators. Arriving at the depot for his return trip to Boston, the king once again indulged anyone who approached him for an autograph.

Kalākaua and party arrived at Waltham by sleigh on January 8, to visit the Waltham Watch Company. Escorted through the factory by company executives, the king expressed interest in the details of how watches were manufactured. Following a visit to an art gallery in Watertown, they proceeded to Newton, boarding a Boston-bound train. Their return trip to San Francisco began on January 9.

== Train trip homewards (January 10–20, 1875) ==
=== Niagara Falls (January 10–11, 1875) ===
The train carrying the king arrived in Niagara Falls, New York, on January 10, for an overnight stay in a large suite at the Spencer House. Advance notice of his visit drew a crowd of spectators who waited for hours in the frigid temperatures at the train station. Accompanied by Kapena, Whiting, and Lieutenant G. M. Totten, and never having recovered from the illness he picked up at the start of his trip, the king confined himself to his suite. The following morning, they departed for Chicago in a private car provided by the Lake Shore and Michigan Southern Railway.

=== Chicago and Milwaukee (January 12–16, 1875) ===
Upon arrival the morning of January 12, Kalākaua's party was met at the depot by Chicago mayor Harvey Doolittle Colvin and numerous city officials. A private reception was held at the Grand Pacific Hotel, where the king's 5-room suite accommodations were provided at no cost by hotel manager John Drake.

The following two days, accompanied by Mayor Colvin, Commissioner John Jones, and several members of the city council, the royal party inspected city infrastructure projects. The agenda included a tour of the city water works, grain storage elevators at Armour's Warehouse, the Union Stock Yards and a visit to the Chicago Board of Trade. Hooley's Theatre hosted the king's party for a performance of the play Lost in London.

On January 15, Kalākaua made a daytrip to Milwaukee as the guest of honor at the formal luncheon hosted by United States Congressman William Pitt Lynde. The congressman was a cousin to Amos Starr Cooke, who ran the Chiefs' Children's School that Kalākaua and his siblings had attended. Lynde's daughter Clara had once visited Hawaii as house guest of the Cookes, when a youthful David Kalākaua had been her unofficial guardian. Also in attendance at the luncheon was Wisconsin Governor Harrison Ludington.

Upon his return to Chicago that same day, he attended a reception at Oriental Lodge No. 33, A.F. & A.M. On the morning of January 16, the royal party departed on the Chicago & Alton Railroad, bound for St. Louis, Missouri.

=== Missouri (January 18–20, 1875) ===
General William Tecumseh Sherman, unable to attend the White House state dinner, visited with the king at a stopover in St. Louis on January 18. The reception at the train station included Sherman, various city officials, newspaper reporters, and a police escort. Due to a large crowd gathered at the front entrance to the Southern Hotel, the police instead brought him through what was described as "the ladies' entrance". After a private reception by the gathered officials in the hotel, Kalākaua was received at the Merchants' Exchange and later given a tour of the city. In Jefferson City, Missouri, he was the guest of a joint session of the state legislature on January 20. Following the visit, the royal party boarded a Missouri Pacific Railroad train heading for California.

== Return to Hawaii (January 27 – February 15, 1875) ==
Arriving in San Francisco on January 27, they quartered at the Grand Hotel. Consul H. W. Severance, who had been appointed by Kamehameha V in 1868, received the Royal Order of Kalākaua in gratitude for his service. Kalākaua made a visit to the Robin Hood Lodge of the Ancient Order of Foresters while he was in the city. On their last evening, the king received proposals from entrepreneurs interested in expanding their operations to Hawaii. Farewell speeches were made by the king, and by former speaker of the California State Assembly George Barstow, representing the Temperance Societies.

On February 3, a volley of artillery salutes rang out from nearby forts as the USS Pensacola carrying the royal party was escorted out of the bay at 11 a.m. by General Schofield and crew on the USS McPherson. US Commissioner to Samoa Albert Barnes Steinberger was a fellow passenger on the voyage home. Ninety-one days after the king had left Hawaii, the Pensacola docked in Honolulu on February 15, 1875.

== Aftermath ==
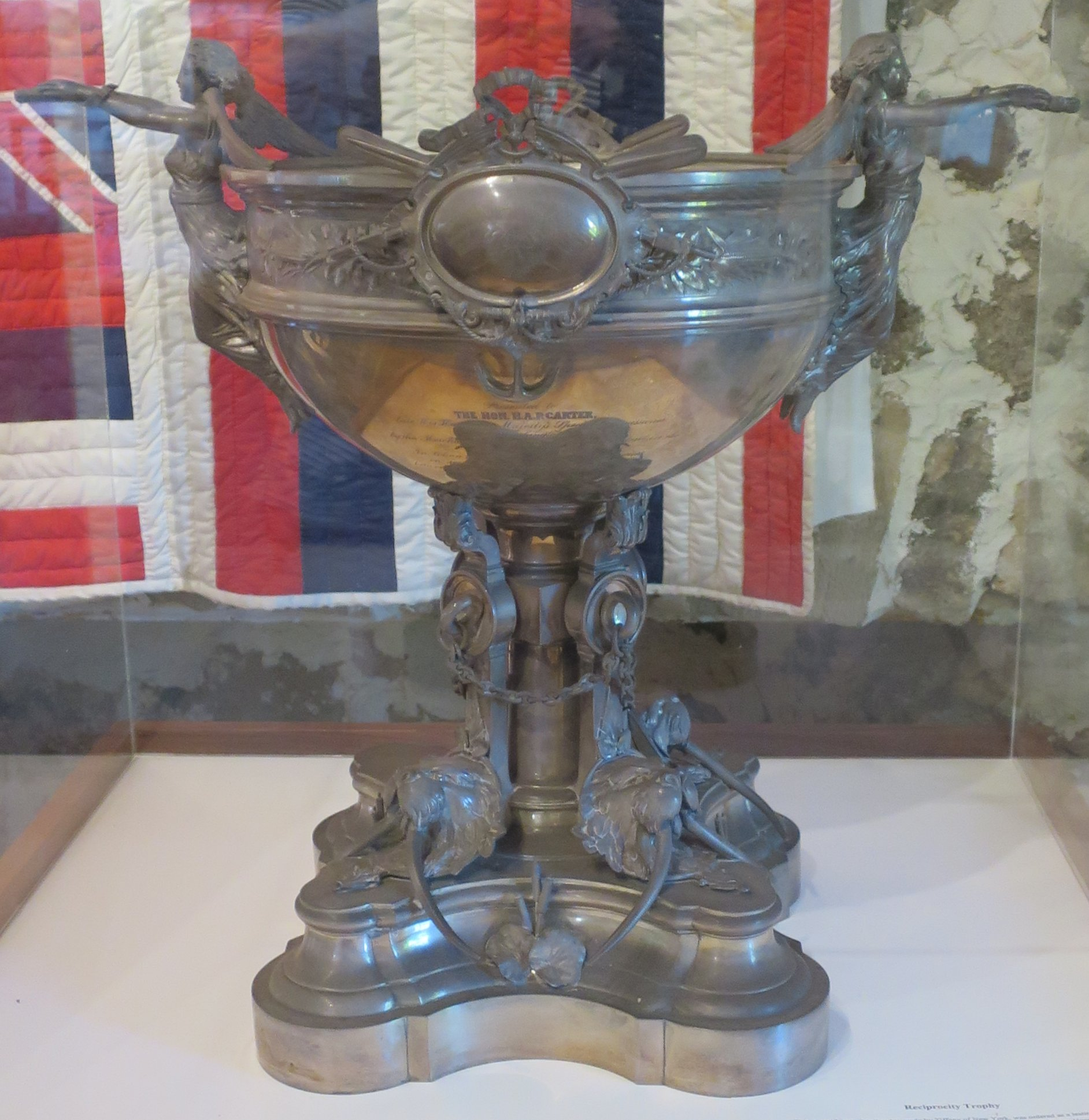
Reciprocity Trophy presented to Henry A. P. Carter for negotiating the Reciprocity Treaty of 1875

The Daily Alta California commented that the king's presence moved the process forward to where, "It is generally conceded that the reciprocity treaty will go through but with little opposition". Hawaiian historian Ralph S. Kuykendall believed Kalākaua's state visit not only gave the king a greater understanding of the American people and the workings of their government, but also educated Americans about the Pacific island nation. The spotlight on Hawaii, "enormously increased the general interest in the current discussion of the proposed reciprocity treaty." Hawaiian legislators Joseph Nāwahī and George Washington Pilipō led the native Hawaiian opposition who saw the treaty as a step towards annexation of the kingdom and only beneficial to the elite number of Euro-American businessmen.

A seven-year reciprocity treaty was negotiated and ratified in 1875. Going into effect September 9, 1876, it admitted Hawaii's sugar products into the United States duty-free. No Hawaiian land was ceded in the agreement. At the treaty's expiration, an extension was negotiated that ceded exclusive use of Pearl Harbor to the United States.

The treaty's most immediate result was an increase in new United States plantation owners. San Francisco sugar refiner Claus Spreckels became a prime investor in Hawaii's sugar industry. Over the term of Kalākaua's reign, the treaty had a major effect on the kingdom's income. In 1874, Hawaii exported $1,839,620.27 in products. In 1881, Kalākaua embarked on a world tour to negotiate with friendly nations for contract labor for Hawaii's plantations. Exported products for 1890, the last full year of his reign, amounted to $13,282,729.48 (all figures given are Hawaiian dollars) Exportation of sugar during that time period went from 24,566,611 pounds (11,143,227 kg) to 330,822,879 pounds (150,058,734 kg).

As the kingdom's income rose, so did Kalākaua's expenditures (all figures given are Hawaiian dollars): this included $343,595 to build and furnish ʻIolani Palace; a delayed coronation in excess of $50,000; and a $75,000 public celebration of his 50th birthday. He made an attempt, subsequently blocked by the legislature, to allocate a $1,000,000 bonus for his San Francisco friend Celso Caesar Moreno to lay an undersea telegraph cable, and briefly appointed him Minister of Foreign Affairs. Moreno and Prime Minister Walter Murray Gibson proposed a Polynesian Confederation administered by Hawaii. The concept never came to fruition, but in an attempt to interfere in the politics of Samoa, an island group that consisted of what is now Samoa and American Samoa, Gibson persuaded the legislature to allocate $100,000 for a confederation steamboat.

Increase in land ownership by businessmen, either missionary descendants or more recent investors, led to a proliferation of non-Hawaiians being elected to the kingdom's legislature. In 1887, Kalākaua was forced to sign the Bayonet Constitution, codifying the legislature as the supreme authority over any actions by the monarchy. Sanford B. Dole, who helped draft it, asserted that key issues were the king's handling of finances, and the lack of a system of checks and balances over the monarchy's stewardship. The new law allowed non-residents to vote, while also placing economic and literacy restrictions on voting rights of residents. Asians, the primary work force on the plantations, had their voting rights stripped.

Kalākaua's brother and heir apparent Leleiohoku II died April 9, 1877. The king then proclaimed his sister Liliʻuokalani to be his successor. Upon his 1891 death, she ascended to the throne. On January 17, 1893, the Kingdom of Hawaii fell to a coup d'état, planned and executed by the Committee of Safety, mostly foreign-born residents in Honolulu, whose goal was the annexation of Hawaii by the United States.

== See also ==
- Bibliography of Kalākaua
- Kalākaua's 1881 world tour

== Bibliography ==
- Barnum, P. T.; Bryan, George Sands (1927). Struggles and triumphs (v. 2 (full view) ed.). New York: A. A. Knopf – via HathiTrust.
- Baur, John E. (1922). "When Royalty Came To California". California Historical Society Quarterly. 67. Honolulu: Hawaiian Historical Society: 244–264. doi:10.2307/25158494. JSTOR 25158494.
- Dole, Sanford B. (1936). Farrell, Andrew (ed.). Memoirs of the Hawaiian Revolution. Honolulu: Advertiser Publishing Company. OCLC 4823270 – via HathiTrust.
- Grant, Ulysses Simpson (2003). The Papers of Ulysses S. Grant: 1874. Southern Illinois University Press. ISBN 978-0-8093-2498-9. OCLC 249193698.
- Kanahele, George S. (1999). Emma: Hawaii's Remarkable Queen. Honolulu: University of Hawaii Press. ISBN 978-0-8248-2240-8. OCLC 40890919.
- Karpiel, Frank J. Jr. (August 2000). "Mystic Ties of Brotherhood: Freemasonry, Ritual, and Hawaiian Royalty in the Nineteenth Century". Pacific Historical Review. 69 (3). University of California Press: 357–397. doi:10.2307/3641714. JSTOR 3641714.
- Kuykendall, Ralph Simpson (1965) [1938]. The Hawaiian Kingdom 1778–1854, Foundation and Transformation. Vol. 1. Honolulu: University of Hawaii Press. ISBN 0-87022-431-X. OCLC 47008868.
- Kuykendall, Ralph Simpson (1953). The Hawaiian Kingdom 1854–1874, Twenty Critical Years. Vol. 2. Honolulu: University of Hawaii Press. ISBN 978-0-87022-432-4. OCLC 47010821.
- Kuykendall, Ralph Simpson (1967). The Hawaiian Kingdom 1874–1893, The Kalakaua Dynasty. Vol. 3. Honolulu: University of Hawaii Press. ISBN 978-0-87022-433-1. OCLC 500374815.
- MacLennan, Carol A. (2014). Sovereign Sugar. Honolulu: University of Hawaii Press. ISBN 978-0-8248-3949-9 – via Project MUSE.
- Osorio, Jon Kamakawiwoʻole (2002). Dismembering Lāhui: A History of the Hawaiian Nation to 1887. Honolulu: University of Hawaii Press. ISBN 0-8248-2549-7. OCLC 48579247.
- Twain, Mark (2002). Mark Twain's Letters, Volume 6: 1874-1875. Oakland, California: University of California Press. ISBN 978-0-520-92993-7.
- Van Dyke, Jon M. (2008). Who Owns the Crown Lands of Hawaii?. University of Hawaiʻi Press. ISBN 978-0-8248-6560-3.
- Vecoli, Rudolph J.; Durante, Francesco; Gabaccia, Donna R.; Venditto, Elizabeth O. (2018). Oh Capitano!: Celso Cesare Moreno – Adventurer, Cheater, and Scoundrel on Four Continents. New York City: Fordham University Press. ISBN 978-0-8232-7989-0 – via Project MUSE.
- Votaw, Homer C. (January 1948). When the Navy was Host to Hawaii's King. Vol. 74. Annapolis, MD: United States Naval Institute. pp. 71–?. ISSN 0041-798X. OCLC 213527336.
