= Ransom Burnell =

American politician

14th President pro tempore of the California State Senate
- In office April 4, 1864 – December 4, 1865
- Preceded by: Addison M. Crane
- Succeeded by: S. P. Wright

Member of the California State Senate from the 14th district
- In office 1861–1865

12th Speaker of the California State Assembly
- In office January 1861 – May 1861
- Preceded by: Phillip Moore
- Succeeded by: George Barstow

Member of the California State Assembly from the 19th district
- In office January 1861 – December 1861

Personal details
- Born: Ransom Burnell; 1821 Sinclairville, New York, U.S.
- Died: February 13, 1880 (age 58-59) Napa, California, U.S.
- Party: Democratic; Union

Ransom Burnell (1821–1880) was a politician from California who served in the California State Assembly and California State Senate, and as President pro tempore of the State Senate and as Speaker of the Assembly, being one of only three people to hold both offices, along with James T. Farley and Toni Atkins. Burnell was elected speaker as a compromise candidate after the State Assembly took 10 days and 109 ballots to elect a speaker.

Preceded by Phillip Moore	Speaker of the California State Assembly; January 1861–May 1861	Succeeded by George Barstow
Preceded by Addison M. Crane	President pro tempore of the California State Senate; 1865-1865	Succeeded by S. P. Wright
