= E. T. Beatty =

American politician (1815–1883)

President of the Idaho Territorial Council
- In office 1877

Member of the Idaho Territorial Council
- In office 1874–1877
- Constituency: Lemhi County

Speaker of the Idaho Territorial House of Representatives
- In office 1868–1869

Member of the Idaho Territorial House of Representatives
- In office 1865–1866
- Constituency: Alturas County
- In office 1868–1869
- Constituency: Idaho County

8th Speaker of the California State Assembly
- In office January 1857 – April 1857
- Preceded by: James T. Farley
- Succeeded by: Ninian E. Whiteside

Member of the California State Assembly from the 19th district
- In office 1854–1857

Personal details
- Born: Elwood T. Beatty; 1815 Philadelphia, Pennsylvania, U.S.
- Died: March 26, 1883 (aged 67–68) Salt Lake City, Utah, U.S.
- Party: Democratic
- Other offices: 1872, 1880–1883: Probate Judge for Lemhi County, Idaho

Elwood T. Beatty (1815–1883) was an American Democratic politician in California and the Idaho Territory.

Beatty was born in Philadelphia, Pennsylvania in 1815. He joined the gold rush in 1849, and served in the California State Assembly from 1854 to 1857, serving as speaker in 1857.

He moved to Idaho City, Idaho Territory, in 1863, and lost an election to represent Boise County in the territorial council that year. He then moved to Rocky Bar, and was elected to the territorial house of representatives in 1865, representing Alturas County. He lost re-election, but was retained by the house of representatives as its sergeant-at-arms for the 1866–1867 term. He moved to Salmon, and in 1868 was elected to represent Boise County in the house of representatives, which elected Beatty as speaker. In 1870, he was elected as county attorney for newly created Lemhi County, and the territorial council selected Beatty as its sergeant-at-arms for the 1870–1871 term. He was appointed as probate judge for Lemhi County in 1872. He was elected to represent the county in the territorial council in 1874 and was re-elected in 1876, serving as the council's president in the latter term, before losing re-election in 1878. He was then elected as probate judge for the county in 1880 and 1882.

Beatty, who was frequently referred to as "the father of Lemhi county," which owed its existence to Beatty's legislative efforts, died at St. Mark's Hospital in Salt Lake City on March 26, 1883.

| Preceded by James T. Farley | Speaker of the California State Assembly; January 1857 – April 1857 | Succeeded by Ninian E. Whiteside |
| Preceded by Unknown | Speaker of the Idaho Territory House of Representatives; 1868–1869 | Succeeded by Unknown |
| Preceded by Unknown | President pro tempore of the Idaho Territorial Council; 1877 | Succeeded by Unknown |
