= Arlington Hotel (Washington, D.C.) =

1868–1912 hotel in Washington, D.C.

Coordinates: 38°54′2.8″N 77°02′4.0″W

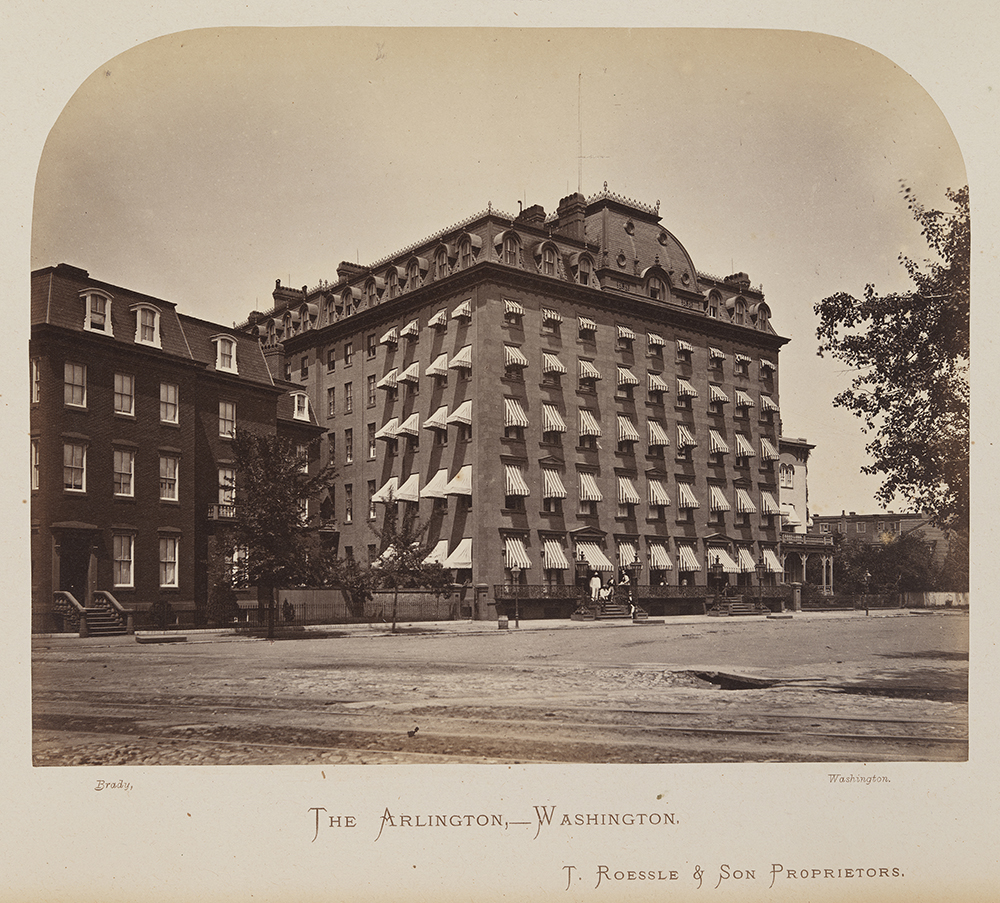
The Arlington Hotel, 1872

The Arlington Hotel was a hotel in Washington, D.C. It was built in 1868 and was considered the most opulent hotel in Washington, D.C. during the post-Civil War era, described as a "distinctive but low-keyed example of the Second Empire style."

The hotel was located at Vermont Avenue and I Street, N.W. in Washington, D.C.

== History ==
=== 19th century ===
The hotel was built in 1868 and was expanded in 1889. It served as the Washington, D.C. residence for several U.S. government officials, including Garret Hobart, who served as the nation's 24th U.S. vice president in the McKinley administration.

Three-term Speaker of the House Thomas Brackett Reed, who also resided in the hotel, died there from Bright's disease in December 1902.

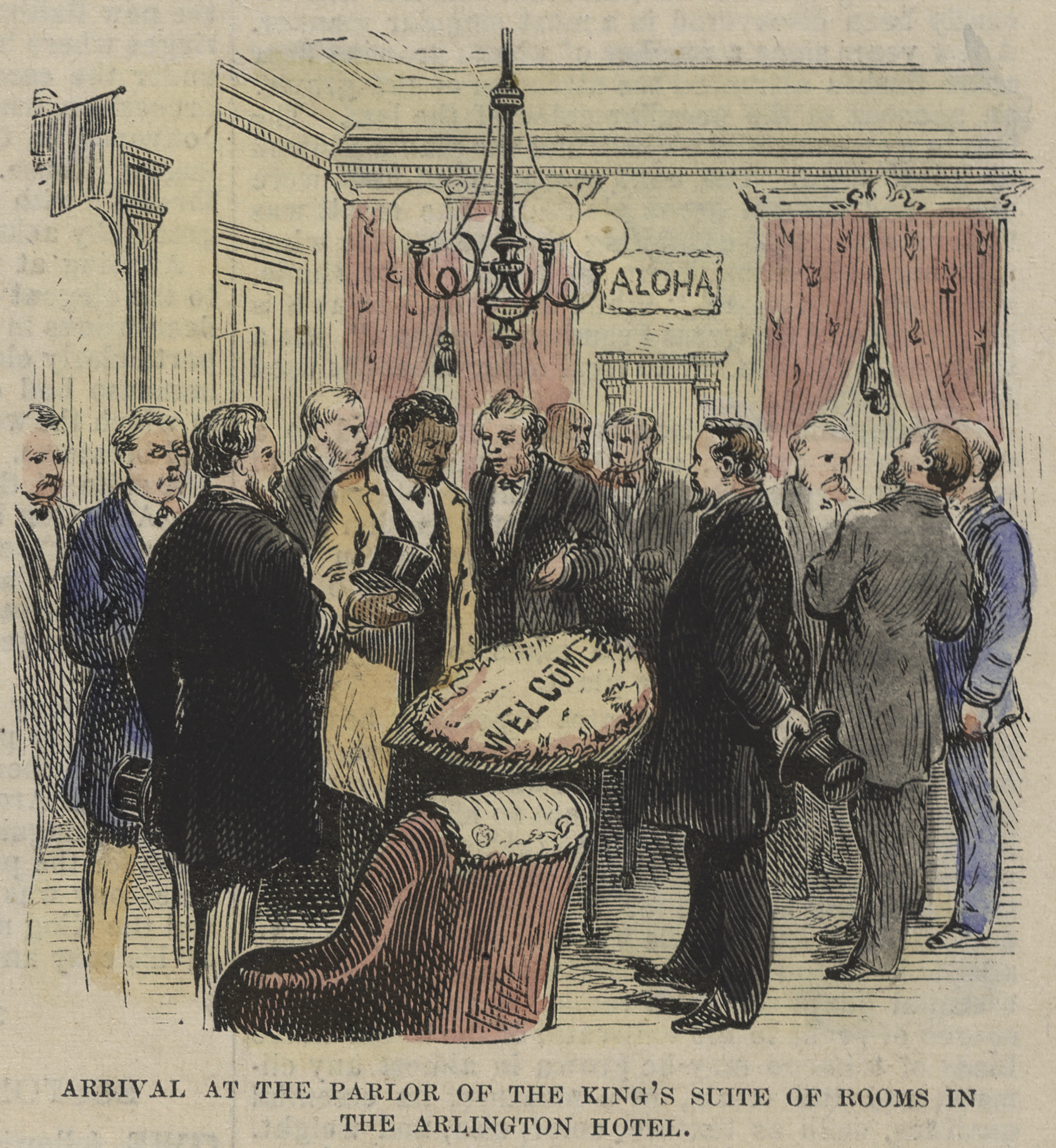
Arrival At The Parlor Of The King's Suite Of Rooms In The Arlington Hotel, a January 1875 portrait of Kalākaua's 1874–75 state visit to the United States

Several international notables also stayed at The Arlington Hotel during their visit to the nation's capital, including King Kalākaua of Hawaii, King Albert I of Belgium, Grand Duke Alexei Alexandrovich of Russia, and Emperor Pedro II of Brazil as well as industrialists and financial magnates Andrew Carnegie and J. P. Morgan.

In 1899, The Successful American magazine recognized the Arlington Hotel as "one of the foremost hotels of the country," reporting that the hotel had "sheltered every preeminent American for years and has been the temporary home of every potentate" visiting Washington, D.C. in the era.

=== 20th century ===
In 1912, the hotel was demolished in order to proceed with plans to build an even larger hotel on the location. When financing fell through for the new hotel, however, the building and land were sold to the U.S. government in 1918, which built the U.S. Department of Veterans Affairs headquarters on the property.
