= Wentworth letter =

Letter written in 1842 by Joseph Smith

The "Wentworth letter" was a letter written in 1842 by Joseph Smith, founder of the Latter Day Saint movement, to "Long" John Wentworth, editor and proprietor of the Chicago Democrat. It outlined the history of the Latter Day Saint movement up to that time, and included Mormonism's Articles of Faith.

The letter was written in response to Wentworth's inquiry on behalf of one of his friends, George Barstow, who was writing a history of New Hampshire. The letter was first published on March 1, 1842, in the Times and Seasons in Nauvoo, Illinois.

A similar letter (with some slight revisions) was published by Daniel Rupp in 1844 in a book called An Original History of the Religious Denominations at Present Existing in the United States.

== Significance ==
The Wentworth Letter is significant for several reasons.

First, it connects the message of what Mormons believe to be the Restoration with the history of said Restoration: "By these things we know..." (Doctrine and Covenants 20:1-17)

Second, it emphasizes the First Vision as an essential part of Latter-day Saint message.

Third, it contains the Standard of Truth, which has become a mission statement for missionaries:

“Our missionaries are going forth to different nations . . . the Standard of Truth has been erected; no unhallowed hand can stop the work from progressing; persecutions may rage, mobs may combine, armies may assemble, calumny may defame, but the truth of God will go forth boldly, nobly, and independent, till it has penetrated every continent, visited every clime, swept every country, and sounded in every ear, till the purposes of God shall be accomplished, and the Great Jehovah shall say the work is done.” (History of the Church 4:540)

Fourth, it ends with the statements which later became the Articles of Faith. B. H. Roberts said of these,

“These Articles of Faith were not produced by the labored efforts and harmonized contentions of scholastics, but were struck off by one inspired mind at a single effort to make a declaration of that which is most assuredly believed by the church, for one making earnest inquiry about the truth."

"The combined directness, perspicuity, simplicity and comprehensiveness of this statement of the principles of our religion may be relied upon as strong evidence of a divine inspiration resting upon the Prophet, Joseph Smith.” (B. H. Roberts, Comprehensive History of the Church, Vol.2, Ch.47, p.131)

And finally, the Wentworth letter re-establishes Joseph Smith's teachings that the Lamanites are the principal ancestors of the American Indians. In the Wentworth letter we read,

"They were principally Israelites, of the descendants of Joseph. The Jaredites were destroyed about the time that the Israelites came from Jerusalem, who succeeded them in the inheritance of the country. The principal nation of the second race fell in battle towards the close of the fourth century. The remnant are the Indians that now inhabit this country." (Wentworth Letter)

== Changes in published versions ==
The wording of some of the articles was modified by the Church of Jesus Christ of Latter-day Saints, the largest denomination in the Latter Day Saint movement, in 1851 and 1902:

1. The fourth article of faith originally read, “We believe that these ordinances are: 1st. Faith in the Lord Jesus Christ; 2d. Repentance; 3d. Baptism by immersion for the remission of sins; 4th. Laying on of hands for the gift of the Holy Ghost.”

- It now reads: “We believe that the first principles and ordinances of the Gospel are: First, faith in the Lord Jesus Christ; Second, Repentance; Third, Baptism by immersion for the remission of sins; Fourth, Laying on of hands for the gift of the Holy Ghost.” (emphasis added) (Answers to Gospel Questions 2:92) The original text was in reference to the third article, which ended in "by obedience to the laws and ordinances of the Gospel."

2. The tenth article originally read, “that Zion will be built upon this continent . . .” It was later changed to "that Zion will be built upon this [the American] continent . . ."

3. The eleventh article originally read, "We claim the privilege of worshiping Almighty God according to the dictates of our conscience,..."

- It now reads: "We claim the privilege of worshiping Almighty God according to the dictates of our own conscience,..."

Joseph Fielding Smith wrote:

“The reason for the adding of the word "principles," and that is the only change, was because the brethren considered when they were preparing the 1921 edition for publication of the D&C, that the term ordinances did not fully cover the article completely. For instance, "faith" is not an ordinance, neither is "repentance," but they are principles. Therefore we felt fully justified in making the article so that it would convey clearly just what the Prophet intended. So now it reads: "We believe that the first principles and ordinances are," and in doing this we were perfectly within the bounds of propriety. Were the Prophet here, he would fully justify our action.”

"We have no apology to make for this addition. We have in no sense destroyed the original meaning.” (Answers to Gospel Questions 2:92)
