= William C. Stratton =

American politician

10th Speaker of the California State Assembly
- In office January 1859–April 1859
- Preceded by: Ninian E. Whiteside
- Succeeded by: Phillip Moore

Member of the California State Assembly from the 17th district
- In office 1857 - 1861

Personal details
- Born: William C. Stratton; 1824 New York, U.S.
- Died: Unknown; after 1870
- Party: Democratic
- Other offices: 1861–1870: California State Librarian

William C. Stratton was a Democratic politician from California who served in the California State Assembly from the 17th district, serving between 1857 and 1861 and being reelected once. In 1859, he served as the Assembly's 10th Speaker. After retiring from the State Assembly he served as the California State Librarian between 1861 and 1870.

Preceded by Ninian E. Whiteside	Speaker of the California State Assembly; January 1859–April 1859	Succeeded by Phillip Moore
Preceded by Unknown	California State Librarian; 1861-1870	Succeeded by Unknown
