= Addison M. Crane =

American politician

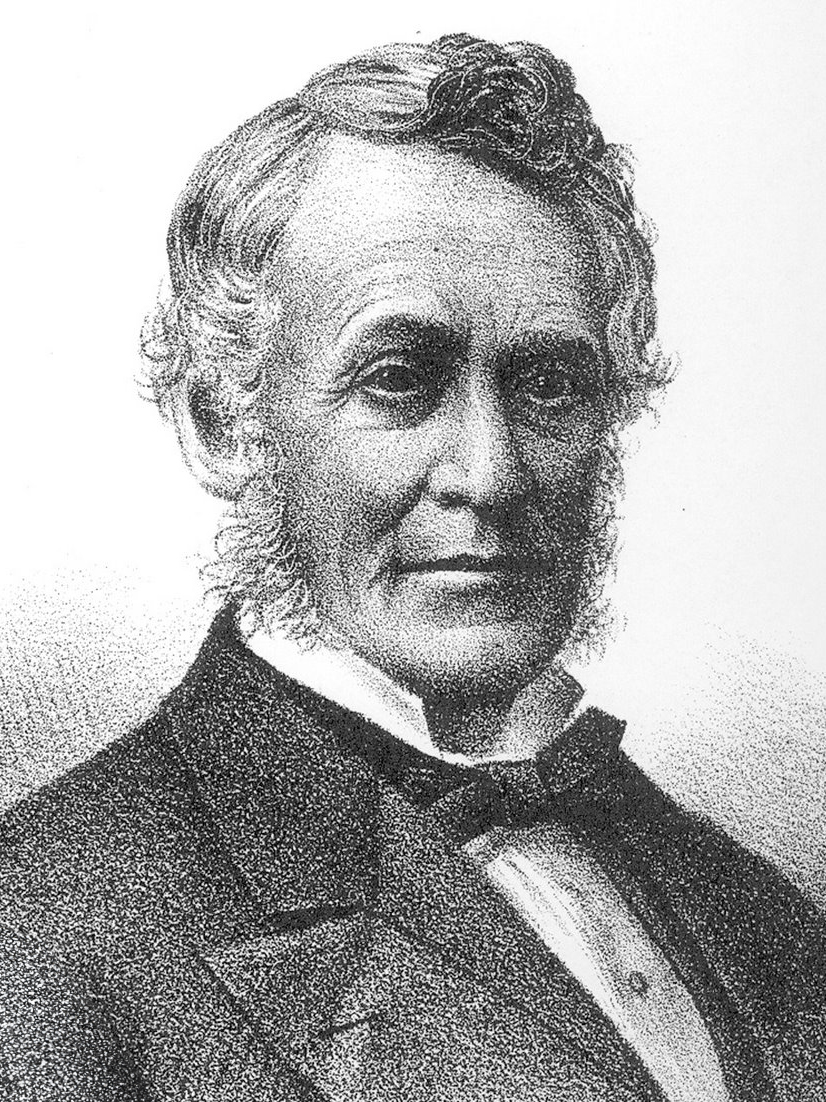

13th President pro tempore of the California State Senate
- In office December 7, 1863 – April 4, 1864
- Preceded by: James M. Shafter
- Succeeded by: Ransom Burnell

Member of the California State Senate
- In office 1862–1864
- Constituency: 9th district
- In office 1861–1862
- Constituency: 10th district

Personal details
- Born: Addison Moses Crane; July 2, 1814 Litchfield, New York, U.S.
- Died: October 20, 1889 (age 75) Oakland, California, U.S.
- Party: Republican; Union
- Spouse: Gertrude Ashley
- Children: 9
- Relatives: William Watrus Crane Jr.

Addison Moses Crane (July 2, 1814 – October 20, 1889) was a judge and politician who served in the California State Senate and served its President pro tempore between 1863 and 1864.

== Biography ==
Crane was born in Litchfield, New York on July 2, 1814. In Indiana he served as a judge on the Court of Common Pleas. Between 1853 and 1857, Crane was a justice on the Alameda County Municipal Court, before being elected to the California State Senate in 1861 as a Republican, representing the 10th district. He was later elected to the 9th district as a member of the Union party in 1862. Crane was the 13th President pro tempore of the Senate from 1863 to 1864. From 1880 to 1885, Crane served as a justice on the Alameda County Superior Court.

He died in 1889 in Oakland, California and was buried in the Mountain View Cemetery.

== Personal life ==
Crane was married to Gertrude Ashley, whom he had 9 children with. He was the brother of Oakland mayor William Watrus Crane Jr.

Preceded by James McMillan Shafter	President pro tempore of the California State Senate; 1863-1864	Succeeded by Ransom Burnell
