= Phillip Moore =

American politician

11th Speaker of the California State Assembly
- In office January 1860–April 1860
- Preceded by: William C. Stratton
- Succeeded by: Ransom Burnell

Member of the California State Assembly from the 16th district
- In office 1852-1861

Personal details
- Born: Phillip Moore; Date Unknown
- Died: Date Unknown
- Party: Democratic

Military service
- Allegiance: Confederate States of America
- Branch/service: Confederate Army

Phillip Moore was a Democratic politician from California, who served in the California State Assembly from the 16th district. He later served as Speaker of the Assembly in 1860. He also served in the Confederate Army during the Civil War

Preceded by William C. Stratton	Speaker of the California State Assembly; January 1861–May 1861	Succeeded by R. Burnell
