= Ninian E. Whiteside =

American politician (1812-1876)

9th Speaker of the California State Assembly
- In office January 1858 – January 1859
- Preceded by: Elwood T. Beatty
- Succeeded by: William C. Stratton

Member of the California State Assembly from the 15th district
- In office January 1858 – January 1859

1st Speaker of the Wisconsin State Assembly
- In office June 5, 1848 – January 1, 1849
- Preceded by: Timothy Burns^{(Territorial Legislature)}
- Succeeded by: Harrison Carroll Hobart

Member of the Wisconsin State Assembly from the Lafayette 1st district
- In office June 5, 1848 – January 1, 1849
- Preceded by: Position established
- Succeeded by: Daniel Morgan Parkinson

Member of the Council of the Wisconsin Territory from Iowa, Lafayette, and Richland counties
- In office October 18, 1847 – March 13, 1848
- Preceded by: Position Established
- Succeeded by: Position Abolished

Personal details
- Born: December 25, 1812 Illinois Territory
- Died: September 1, 1876 (aged 63) Marysville, California, U.S.
- Resting place: Marysville Cemetery; Marysville, California
- Party: Democratic
- Spouse: Caroline Ewing Vineyard
- Children: Bolin James; Ninian Edward
- Parents: William Bolen Whiteside (father); Elizabeth (Raine) Whiteside (mother)

Ninian Edward Whiteside (December 25, 1812 – September 1, 1876) was an American Democratic politician, attorney, and pioneer who served as the 1st Speaker of the Wisconsin State Assembly and 9th Speaker of the California State Assembly. Whiteside is believed to be the only person to serve as the Speaker of the House in two separate state legislatures in the United States.

== Early life and career ==
Born in the Illinois Territory, Whiteside settled in the mining district in southern Wisconsin. Whiteside practiced law as a member of the Wisconsin Bar.

== Legislative career ==
In 1846, Whiteside served in the first Wisconsin Constitutional Convention of 1846. In 1847–1848, Whiteside served in the Wisconsin Territorial Council. In 1848, Whiteside was elected to the first Wisconsin State Assembly from Belmont, Wisconsin and was elected the first Speaker of the Wisconsin Assembly. He then went to California to take part in the California Gold Rush. In the same year, he was elected to the California State Assembly and was elected Speaker of the California State Assembly by a vote of 66–6. Whiteside was a delegate to the Breckinridge Convention in 1860. Whiteside served in the State Assembly until an election defeat in 1863.

=== Achievements ===
While in the Wisconsin Legislature, Whiteside authored new laws regarding the renaming and restructuring of new villages and towns; renovations and repairs to the Wisconsin State Capitol; a new municipal water and well system for the capitol building; local tax levy requirements; establishment of the office of adjutant general of the militia of the State of Wisconsin; and plaintiff liabilities.

While in the California State Legislature, Whiteside authored new laws regarding incorporation of the Hornitos, California; restricting of herding of sheep to certain California county pastures; a new special tax levy for county jails; expansion of powers for the Board of Supervisors of the City and County of San Francisco and a funding bill for the City of Oakland, California.

== Death ==
Whiteside continued to practice law as a member of the State Bar of California until his retirement. He died in Marysville, California after an illness.

Wisconsin State Assembly
New state government	Member of the Wisconsin State Assembly from the Lafayette 1st district June 5, 1848 – January 1, 1849	Succeeded by Daniel Morgan Parkinson
Preceded by Timothy Burns (Territorial Legislature)	Speaker of the Wisconsin State Assembly; June 5, 1848 – January 1, 1849	Succeeded by Harrison Carroll Hobart
California Assembly
Preceded by Elwood T. Beatty	Speaker of the California State Assembly; January 1858 – January 1859	Succeeded by William C. Stratton
