= James T. Farley =

American politician (1829-1886)

James Thompson Farley
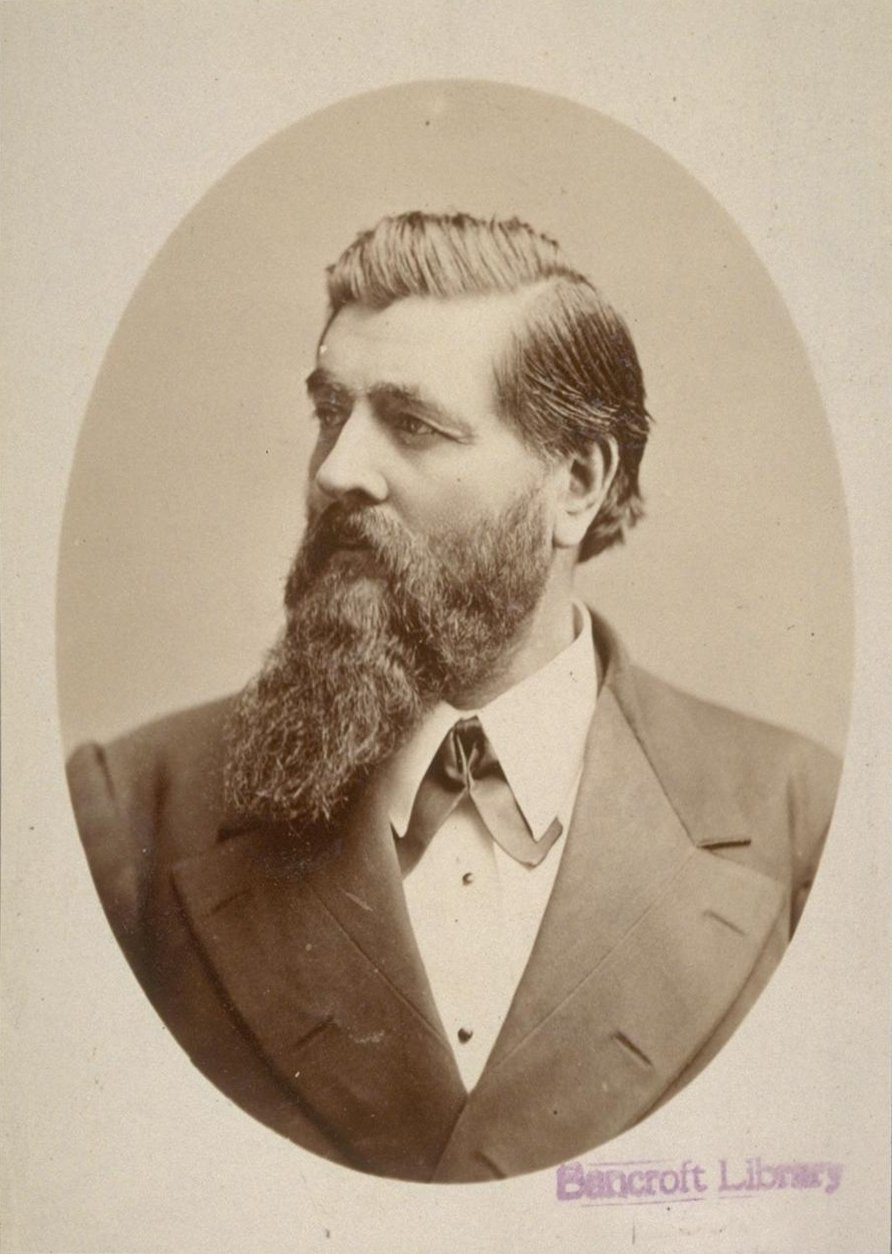
- Farley c. 1882

United States Senator from California
- In office March 4, 1879 – March 3, 1885
- Preceded by: Aaron A. Sargent
- Succeeded by: Leland Stanford

18th President pro tempore of the California State Senate
- In office December 1, 1871 - March 13, 1872
- Preceded by: Edward J. Lewis
- Succeeded by: William Irwin

Member of the California Senate
- In office 1869–1879
- Constituency: 16th district (1875–1879)
- Constituency: 14th district (1869–1875)

7th Speaker of the California State Assembly
- In office January 1856 – April 1856
- Preceded by: William W. Stow
- Succeeded by: Elwood T. Beatty

Member of the California State Assembly from 19th district
- In office 1855–1860

Personal details
- Born: August 6, 1829 Albemarle County, Virginia
- Died: January 22, 1886 (aged 56) Jackson, California
- Party: Democratic; Know Nothing (formerly); Whig (formerly)

James Thompson Farley (August 6, 1829 – January 22, 1886) was a United States Senator from California.

== Early life ==
He was born in Albemarle County, Virginia, and moved to Missouri at an early age. Drawn by the discovery of gold and hastened by a duel in which he nearly killed a man who had been his rival for a woman's affections, Farley moved to California in 1849. He tried mining for gold in Calaveras and Tuolumne counties but had little success. As an alternative to the mining work, he studied law. Farley was admitted to the bar in 1854, commencing his law practice in Amador County.

== Political career ==
He was elected to the California State Assembly from Amador County at the age of 25 as a member of the Whig Party. At the time, only five years after California had become a state and in accordance with the original Constitution of California, members of the assembly were chosen annually. Farley ran for re-election in 1855, this time as a member of the Know Nothing Party, which was in the majority of the legislature at the time. He again shifted allegiances to the Democratic Party following the collapse of the Know Nothing Party, remaining with the strong political contingent in the assembly and was elected to be Speaker of the Assembly in 1856.

He moved from the state assembly to the California State Senate where he served for as a Democrat. He served as president pro tempore for one session, from 1871 to 1872. He was a friend and spokesperson for the administration of Governor Haight.

He was for several years the recognized leader of the Democratic Party in California, and in 1873 received the caucus nomination of his party for U.S. Senate to fill the vacancy created by the retirement of John S. Hager. However, his nomination was defeated by Governor Newton Booth, an independent anti-monopolist. Fortuitously, Senator Aaron A. Sargent retired three years later and Farley was again nominated, and this time elected to the U.S. Senate from California in 1877. He served there from 1879 until 1885. He was not a candidate for renomination in 1884.

He resumed the practice of law after leaving Washington, D.C., and died in Jackson, California in 1886 after three years of struggling with illness. He is buried in Jackson City Cemetery in Jackson.

== Personal life ==
Farley was described as having a "fine appearance, warmth and congeniality of feelings." His law practice in Jackson served as a launching pad for other California politicians such as Judge Henry L. Waldo who became the district attorney of Amador County from 1867 until 1870, as well as Anthony Caminetti, who also became the district attorney of Amador County but later became a United States representative from California from 1891 to 1895.

He was married in 1876 to Flora Forester Phelps of Amador County. They were the parents of a son and a daughter.

Political offices
Preceded by Five members	California State Assemblyman, 19th District (Amador County seat); 1855–1857 (with J. W. D. Palmer, then George W. Wagner)	Succeeded by William M. Seawell
Preceded by William W. Stow	Speaker of the California State Assembly; January 1856 – April 1856	Succeeded by Elwood T. Beatty
Preceded by Aaron A. Sargent	U.S. senator (Class 3) from California; 1879–1885; Served alongside: Newton Booth, John F. Miller	Succeeded by Leland Stanford
