= Kaumakapili Church =

Historic church in Hawaii, United States

- U.S. National Register of Historic Places
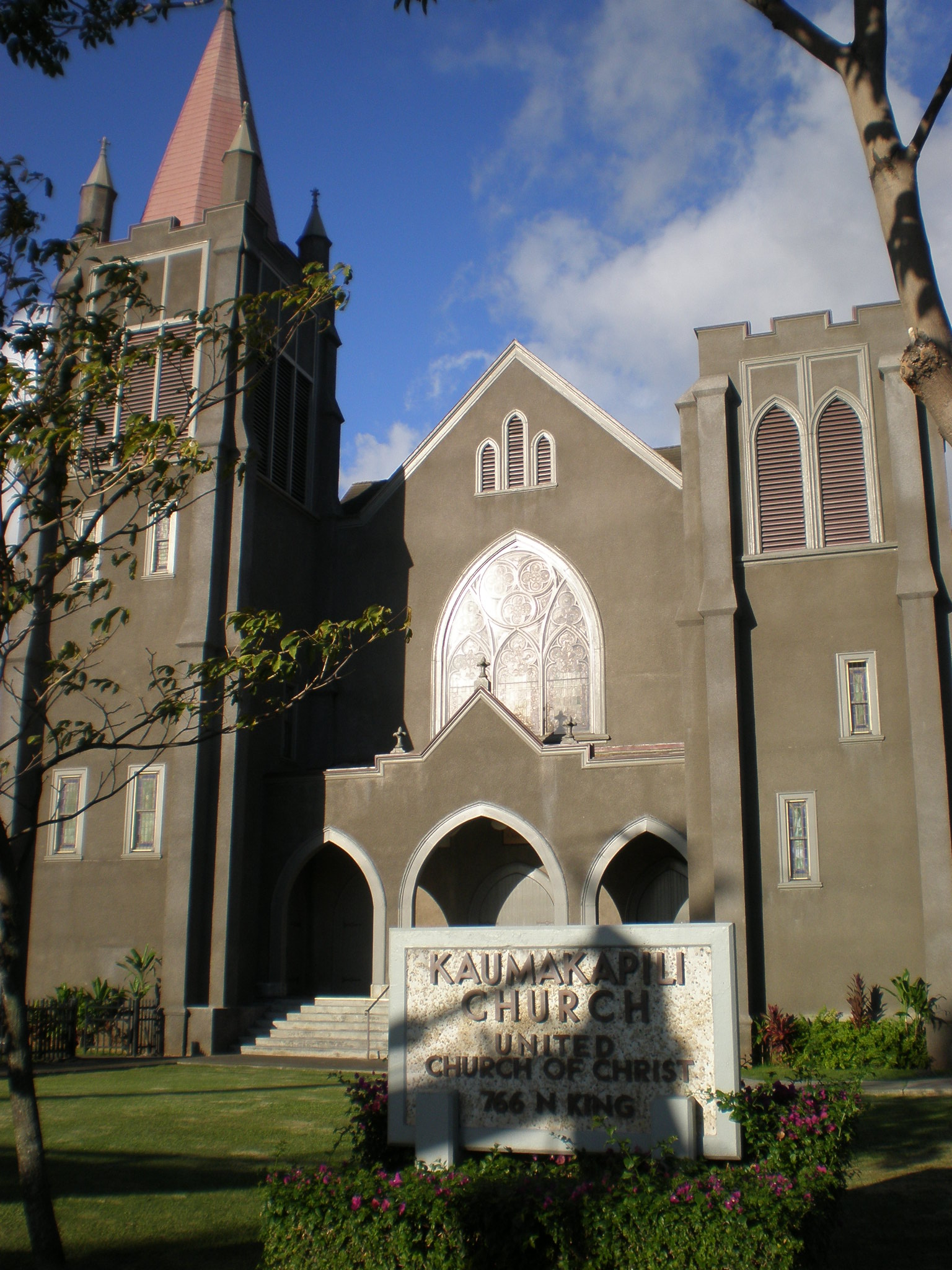

- Location within Hawaii
- Nearest city: Honolulu, Hawaii
- Coordinates: 21°19′18″N 157°52′00″W
- Area: 1.1 acres (0.45 ha)
- Built: 1910
- Architect: H. L. Kerr
- Architectural style: Late Gothic Revival
- NRHP reference No.: 08000372
- Added to NRHP: May 5, 2008

Kaumakapili Church is a Gothic Revival church located at 766 North King Street in the Kapālama neighborhood of Honolulu, Hawaii. It was originally established on April 1, 1838, at the corner of Smith and Beretania Streets as a Protestant church for commoners, as the only existing church at the time, the Kawaiahao Church, was primarily attended by Hawaiian nobility. A new brick and wood frame church building with two steeples was built from 1881 to 1888. However, that building was burned along with large areas of Chinatown in an attempt to control an outbreak of bubonic plague. Construction began on a third church building at the current site in 1910; this church, which is still in use, was dedicated in 1911. In 1993, a $2.4 million restoration project conducted by Mason Architects rehabilitated the church, which had been extensively damaged by nature and vandalism.

The church was added to the National Register of Historic Places on May 5, 2008.

== Gallery ==
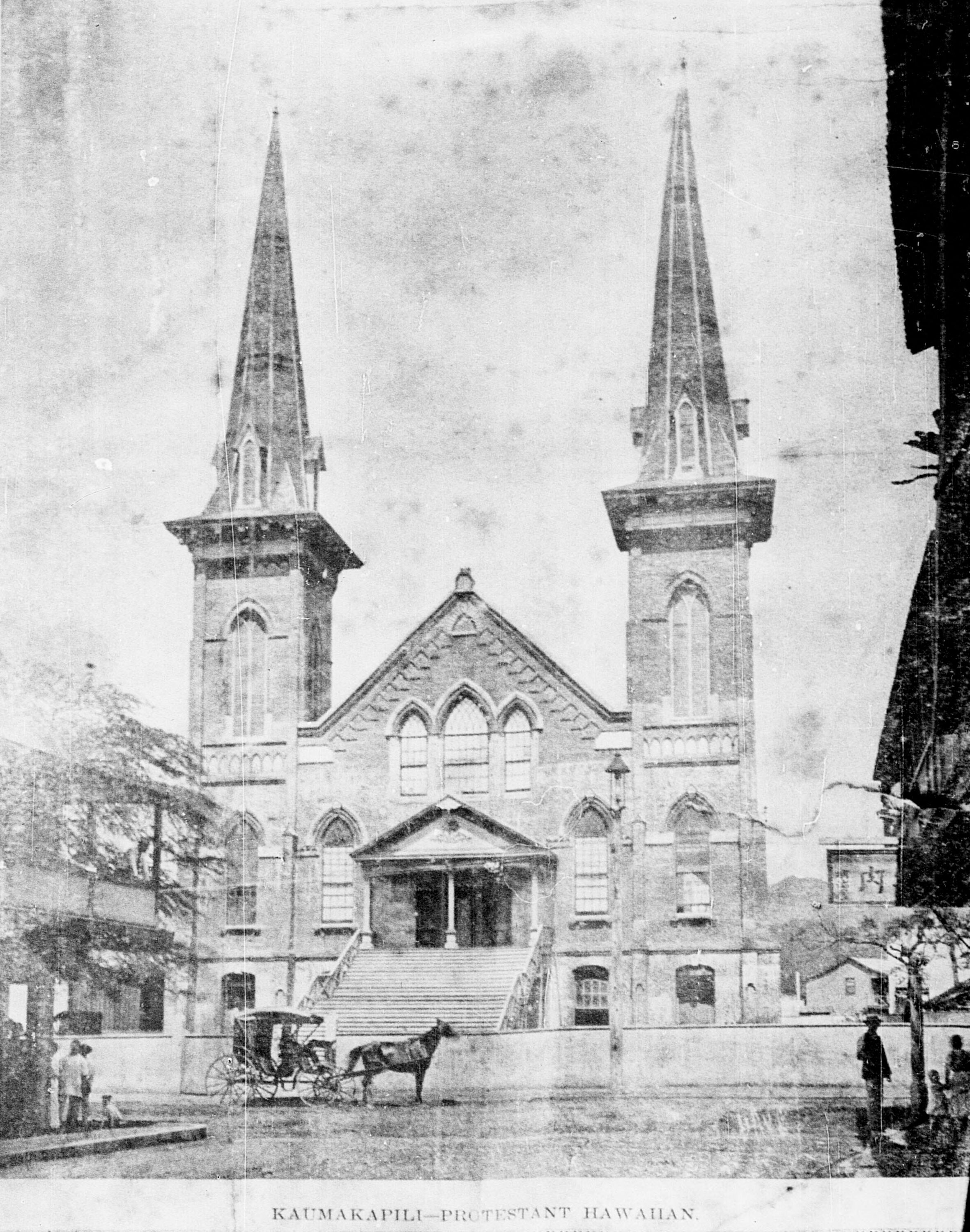
Kaumakapili Church

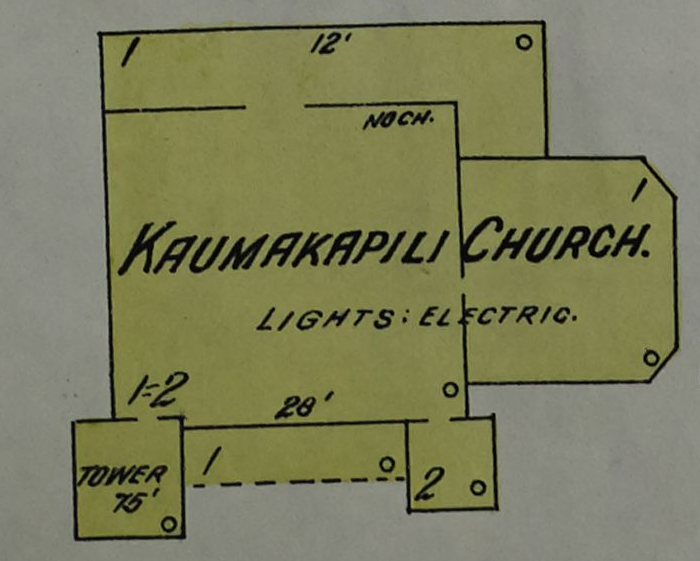
Kaumakapili Church in 1914 Sanborn fire insurance map
