= George Barstow (California politician) =

American politician

13th Speaker of the California State Assembly
- In office January 1862–May 1862
- Preceded by: Ransom Burnell
- Succeeded by: Tim N. Machin

Member of the California State Assembly
- In office 1877–1879
- Constituency: 10th district
- In office 1861–1865
- Constituency: 8th district

Personal details
- Born: George Barstow; June 19, 1812 Haverhill, New Hampshire, U.S.
- Died: September 9, 1883 (aged 59) San Francisco, California, U.S.
- Party: Republican; Union; Democratic
- Spouse: Emily E. Shipley (m. 1844)
- Education: Dartmouth College

Military service
- Allegiance: United States Army

George Barstow (June 19, 1812 – September 9, 1883) was a professor, lawyer, historian, and politician who served in the California State Assembly in the 1860s and 1870s. He was elected Speaker of the Assembly in 1862, becoming the first Republican to hold the post. He briefly left the legislature but returned in 1877, this time as a Democrat.

== Life and career ==
Barstow was born in 1824 in New Hampshire and studied at Dartmouth College, before moving to Boston, where he studied law and wrote The History of New Hampshire, a book about New Hampshire's history. While writing the book, Barstow played a part in the history of the Latter Day Saint movement, when he contacted a friend, John Wentworth, asking for information about the Mormon faith. Wentworth then forwarded the request to the movement founder Joseph Smith, who sent a letter back to Wentworth which outlined the principles of the religion. This list of principles became known to Mormons as the Articles of Faith. While living in Boston, Barstow was a failed Democratic candidate for the Massachusetts General Court and for the U.S. House of Representatives.

He married his wife, Emily E. Shipley, in 1844. He then moved back to New Hampshire and then to New York City before he arrived in San Francisco in 1858 where he was a professor of medical jurisprudence at the University of the Pacific. He was elected to the California State Assembly from the 8th district as a Republican in 1861 and was elected Speaker of the Assembly in 1862, being California's first Republican Assembly Speaker. While he was Speaker, Barstow was known as "Little Ironsides" due to his short stature. Barstow left the Assembly in 1865, but was re-elected from the 10th district as a Democrat in 1877, holding the office until 1879.

Barstow died in San Francisco in 1883.

Preceded by Ransom Burnell	Speaker of the California State Assembly; January 1862–May 1862	Succeeded by Tim N. Machin
