= President's Room =

Room in the US Capitol

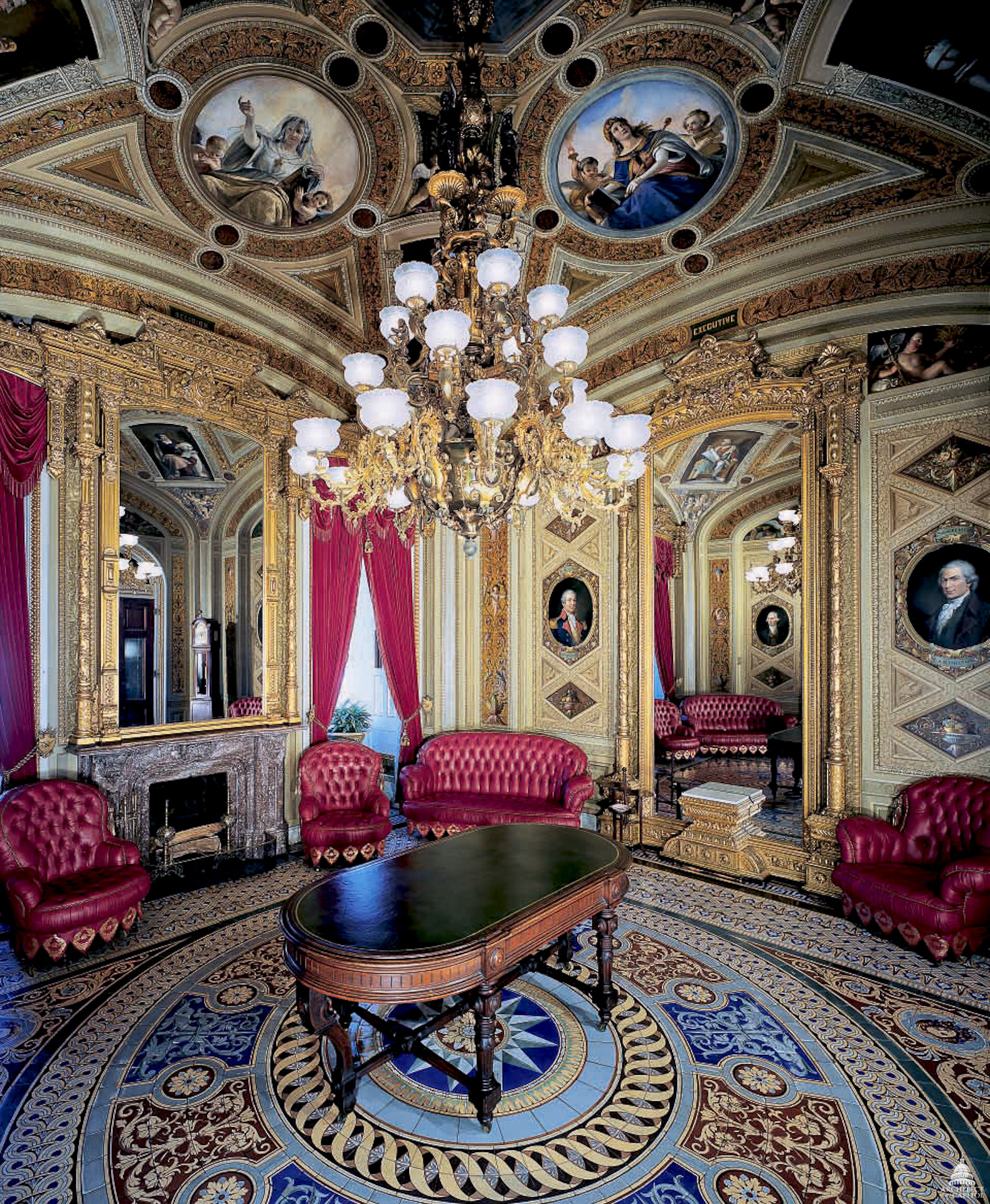
The President's Room, pictured in 2011

The President's Room is one of the most ornate rooms in the United States Capitol, richly adorned with fresco paintings by Greek-Italian artist Constantino Brumidi. The room was completed in 1859 as part of the Capitol's vast extension, which added new Senate and House wings and the new cast-iron dome. The President's Room is room number S-216.

== History ==
When architects designed the new Senate wing in the early 1850s, senators directed them to include a President's Room, partly to symbolize the Senate's constitutional responsibility to provide the president of the United States with advice and consent on nominations and treaties. Presidents used the room to sign legislation into law at the close of each session of Congress. This practice ended in 1933 with the ratification of the Twentieth Amendment to the United States Constitution, which established different ending dates for presidential and congressional terms of office. Although occasionally used by presidents, the room today is utilized primarily by senators for interviews and press conferences.

In 1991, the room's historic furnishings were restored to the 1870s period by the Senate Commission on Art. The ceiling and walls were also restored to their original glowing colors and subtle details, and the mirrors were regilded. The room is only accessible on a guided tour with a Congressional staff member when the Senate is not in session.

During the impeachment trial of Bill Clinton, Chief Justice William Rehnquist used the President's Room as an office. Chief Justice John Roberts used the room as an office during the first impeachment trial of Donald Trump.

=== Use by presidents ===
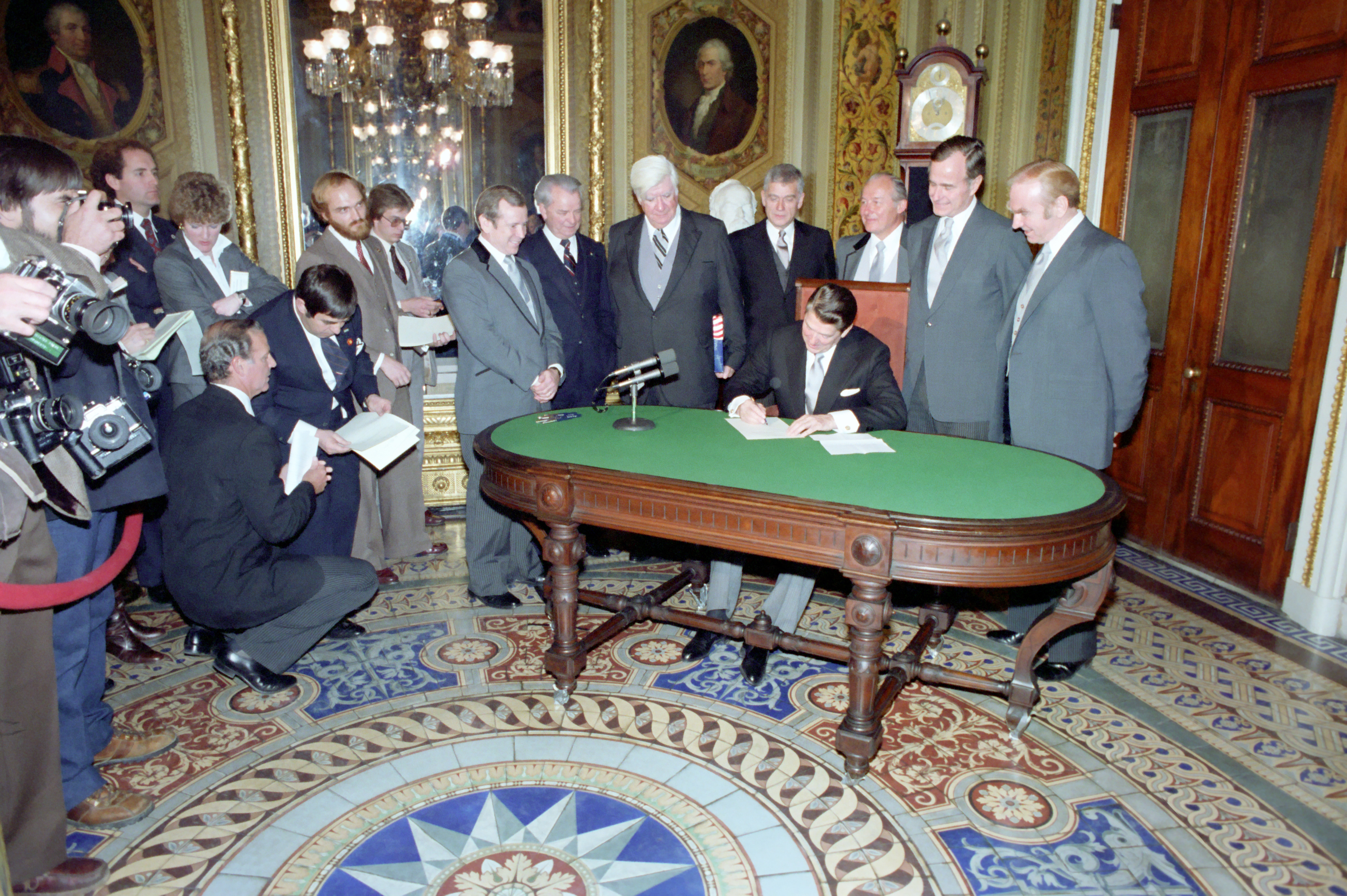
Ronald Reagan signing Executive Order on Federal Hiring Freeze and Cabinet Member Nominations in the President's Room on January 20, 1981

The room was first used by President James Buchanan on March 4, 1861, at a time of great peril for the nation, after several southern states had left the Union and a month before the Civil War began. The country was still at war on March 3, 1865, when President Abraham Lincoln visited the President's Room to sign the usual flurry of end-of-session legislation. There he received word from Union General Ulysses S. Grant that Confederate General Robert E. Lee had requested a meeting to discuss "the subjects of controversy between the belligerents."

After consulting with Secretary of War Edwin M. Stanton and Secretary of State William Henry Seward, Lincoln responded through Stanton that Grant was not to confer with the Confederate general, "unless it be for the capitulation of General Lee's army," but should "press to the utmost your military advantages."

Lee surrendered the Army of Northern Virginia to Grant the following month. A dozen years later, on March 3, 1877, President Grant used the President's Room to sign legislation enacted during the final days of the Forty-fourth Congress.

Woodrow Wilson had great plans for this room when he became president in 1913. The first Democratic president in sixteen years, he intended to use the President's Room as a working office to confer with congressional Democrats, who controlled both houses for the first time in eighteen years. At first, Wilson was a frequent caller, but he visited the Capitol less often as support for his legislative agenda faltered and his relations with Congress deteriorated. Republicans, who regained the Senate majority in 1918, resented Wilson's failure to confer with the Senate before negotiating the treaty ending World War I, as did many members of Wilson's own party, and the President suffered a humiliating defeat when the Senate rejected the Versailles Treaty on November 19, 1919, and again on March 19, 1920.

Wilson's last visit to the President's Room was particularly painful. While signing end-of-session legislation on March 4, 1921, he was informed by Foreign Relations Committee chairman Henry Cabot Lodge (R-Mass.), who had led the fight against the treaty, that Congress had completed its work and awaited "further communication from you." His health broken by an exhausting campaign to secure popular support for the treaty, Wilson refused to look at his adversary, responding with a terse "I have no further communication."

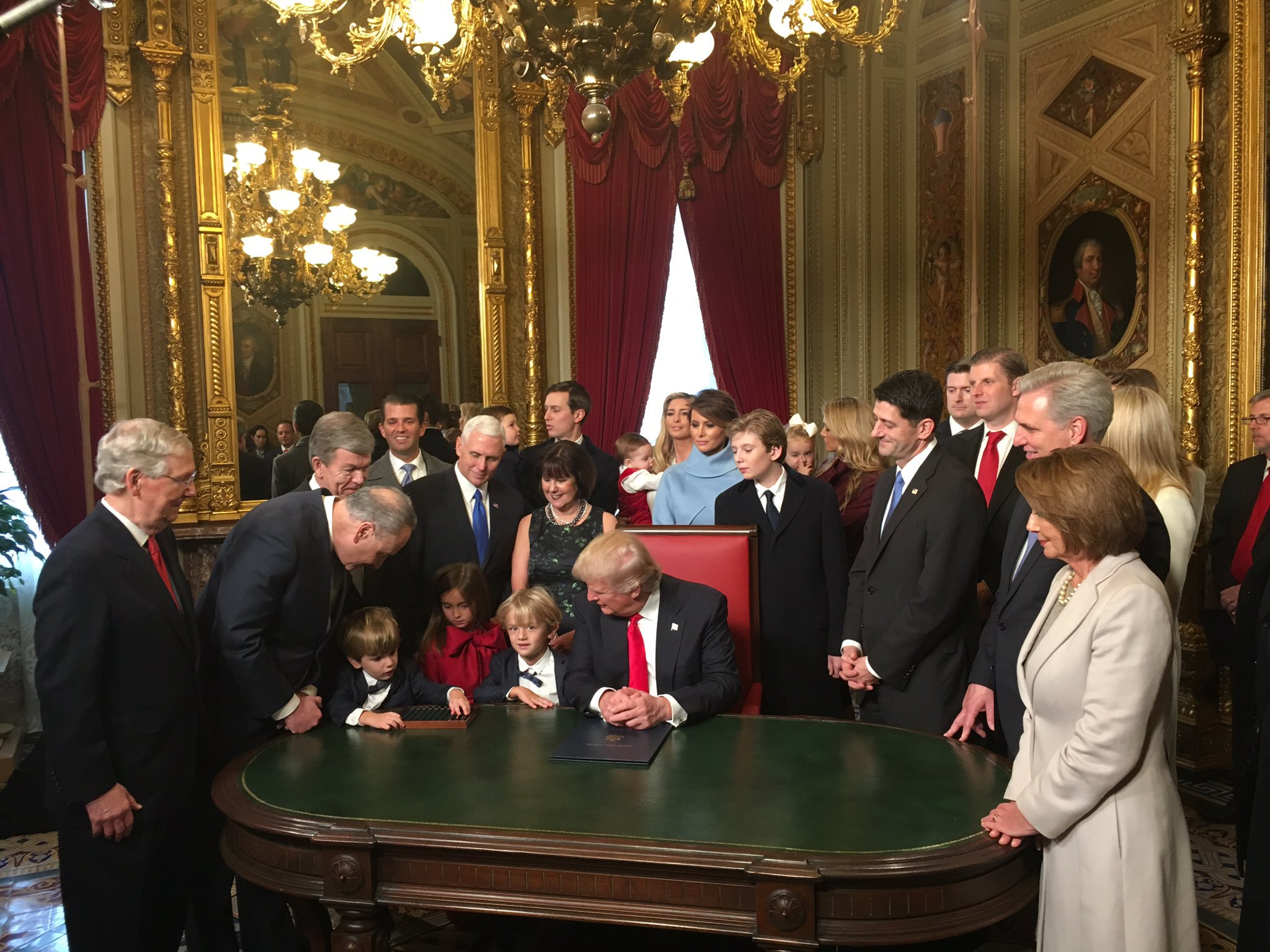
Donald Trump in the room before signing orders on January 20, 2017

On August 6, 1965, President Lyndon B. Johnson became the first president in over a quarter century to use the President's Room for its intended purpose, signing the 1965 Voting Rights Act into law after a stirring and emotional ceremony in the Capitol Rotunda. Johnson had appeared before a Joint Session of Congress on March 15, 1965, to urge passage of the bill guaranteeing equal voting rights for African American citizens. He returned to the Capitol to sign the act, a gesture that, as he explained in his memoirs, was intended to "dramatize the importance we attached to this bill – and to give full measure to the Congress."

Senator Howard Baker of Tennessee had unsuccessfully urged President Richard Nixon to move his working offices to the Capitol, leaving the White House as the president's ceremonial and residential quarters. Likewise, Jimmy Carter had expressed intentions to use the signing room when he took office in 1977, but he never acted on them.

In the days following his November 1980 election victory, President-elect Ronald Reagan looked toward the Capitol and told reporters, "Get the President's Room ready!" Living up to his promise, Reagan made the President's Room his first stop after leaving the Capitol's inaugural platform on January 20, 1981. Accompanied by Vice President George H. W. Bush, Senate leaders Howard Baker and Robert C. Byrd, and a large media contingent, the new president signed nominations to U.S. Cabinet posts and an order freezing federal employment. On several occasions in the ensuing months, Reagan returned to this room to confer with congressional leaders on a budget compromise. Following Reagan's example, George H. W. Bush, Bill Clinton, George W. Bush, Barack Obama, Donald Trump, and Joe Biden have chosen to begin their presidencies with a visit here.

Although presidents since Lyndon Johnson, have used the room for various purposes during their terms in office, Johnson was apparently the last president to sign legislation in the President's Room until Donald Trump. Trump signed a bill on his first day in office, January 20, 2017, waiving the seven-year waiting period for a former military officer to serve as Secretary of Defense. That law allowed James Mattis to be nominated.

== Sources ==
- Fleming, Denna Frank (1930). The Treaty Veto of the American Senate. New York: G.P. Putnam's Sons.
- Lodge, Henry Cabot (1902). "The Treaty-Making Power of the Senate". A Fighting Frigate and Other Essays and Addresses. New York: Charles Scribner's Sons.
- This article incorporates public domain material from websites or documents of the United States Senate.
