= List of United States senators from Massachusetts =

Current delegation

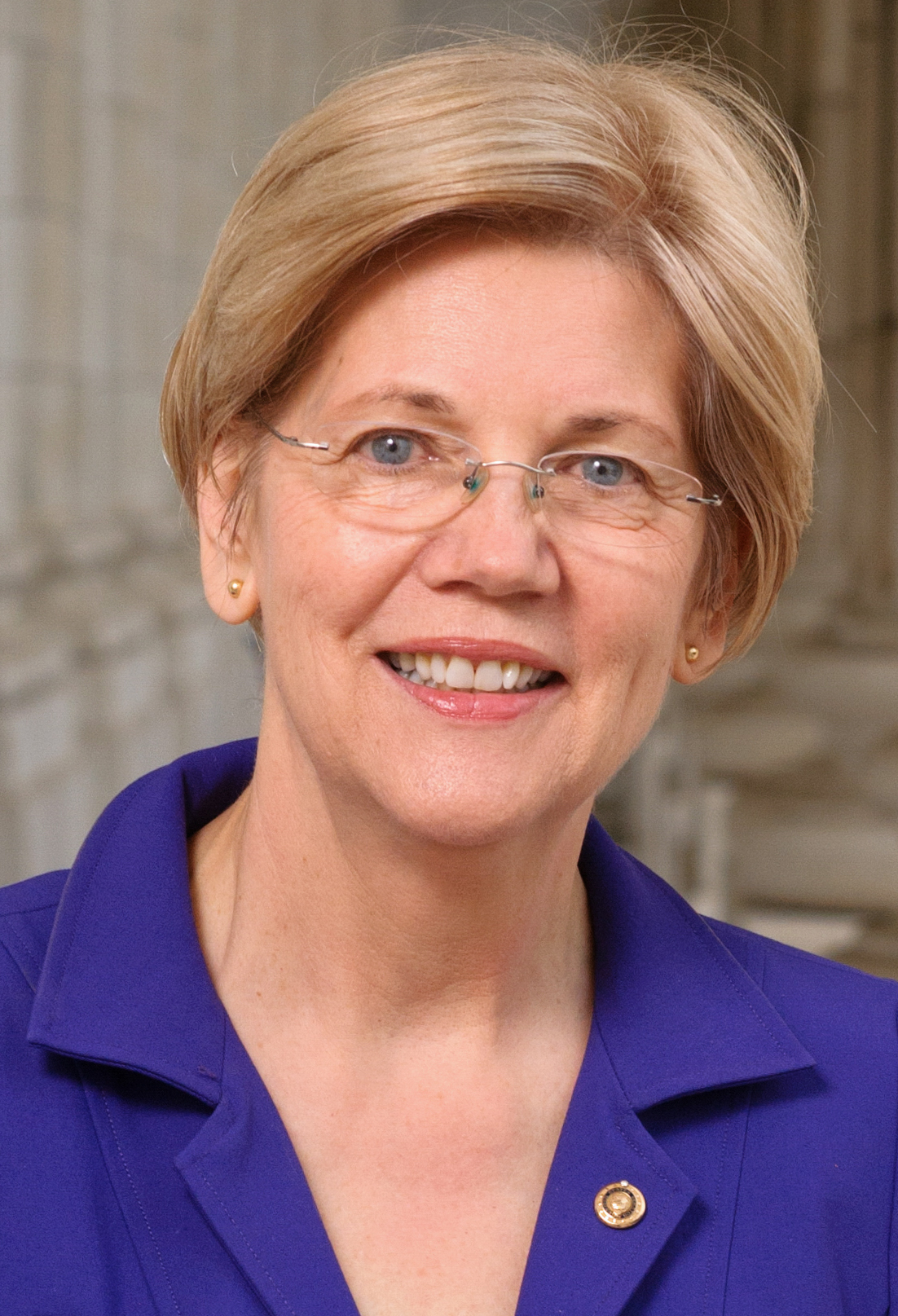
Elizabeth Warren
(D)

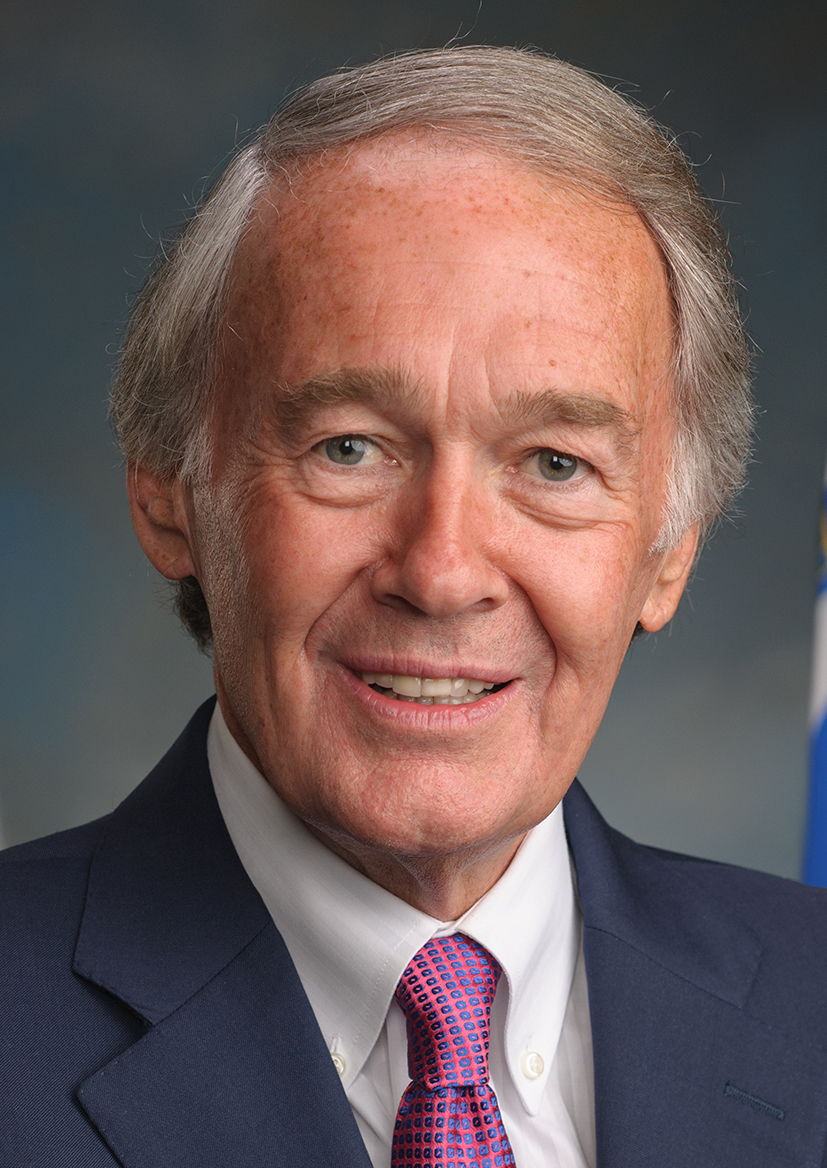
Ed Markey
(D)

(ordered by seniority)

Below is a chronological listing of the United States senators from Massachusetts. According to the Seventeenth Amendment to the United States Constitution adopted in 1913, U.S. senators are popularly elected for a six-year term. Elections are held the first Tuesday after November 1, and terms begin on January 3, about two months after the vote. Before 1914, and the enforcement of the Seventeenth Amendment, the state's U.S. senators were chosen by the Massachusetts General Court, and before 1935, their terms began March 4.

The current senators are Democrats Elizabeth Warren and Ed Markey. Ted Kennedy was Massachusetts's longest-serving senator, serving from 1962 until his death in 2009.

== Mid-term vacancy appointment processes ==
Through the 20th century, mid-term vacancies were filled with the governor's appointee, with the appointment expiring at the next biennial state election. In 2004, the Democratic-controlled state legislature changed the vacancy-filling process, mandating that a special election occur, which removed the governor's appointment power. This statute was enacted over the veto by the governor, Mitt Romney. The leadership of the Massachusetts legislature at the time was concerned that the Republican Governor Mitt Romney would appoint a Republican if Democratic Senator John Kerry were elected president of the United States in the 2004 election. Generally, the law requires a special election within 145 to 160 days from the date of the filing of a Senate resignation. The law contemplates resignations that become effective some period of time after the filing of the resignation, so long as the election occurs after effective date of the resignation.

While terminally ill with brain cancer, Ted Kennedy requested that the Massachusetts legislature change the law to allow an interim appointment. Kennedy died shortly thereafter, and the legislature quickly passed a bill providing for an interim appointment. On September 24, 2009, Governor Deval Patrick signed the bill, and appointed Paul G. Kirk, who had previously served as one of Kennedy's congressional aides and as chairman of the Democratic National Committee.

== List of senators ==
Class 1 Class 1 senators belong to the electoral cycle that most recently had regular elections in 2006, 2012, 2018, and 2024. The next election will be in 2030.						C	Class 2 Class 2 senators belong to the electoral cycle that most recently had regular elections in 2008, 2014, 2020, and 2026. The next election will be in 2032.					
#	Senator	Party	Dates in office	Electoral history	T	C	T	Electoral history	Dates in office	Party	Senator	#
1	Tristram Dalton (Newburyport)	Pro- Admin.	Mar 4, 1789 – Mar 3, 1791	Elected in 1788. Lost re-election.	1	1st	1	Elected in 1788.	Mar 4, 1789 – Jun 1, 1796	Pro- Admin.	Caleb Strong (Northampton)	1
2	George Cabot (Beverly)	Pro- Admin.	Mar 4, 1791 – Jun 9, 1796	Elected in 1790. Resigned.	2	2nd	1	Elected in 1788.	Mar 4, 1789 – Jun 1, 1796	Pro- Admin.	Caleb Strong (Northampton)	1
2	George Cabot (Beverly)	Pro- Admin.	Mar 4, 1791 – Jun 9, 1796	Elected in 1790. Resigned.	2	3rd	2	Re-elected in 1793. Resigned.	Mar 4, 1789 – Jun 1, 1796	Pro- Admin.	Caleb Strong (Northampton)	1
2	George Cabot (Beverly)	Federalist	Mar 4, 1791 – Jun 9, 1796	Elected in 1790. Resigned.	2	4th	2	Re-elected in 1793. Resigned.	Mar 4, 1789 – Jun 1, 1796	Federalist	Caleb Strong (Northampton)	1
Vacant			Jun 9, 1796 – Jun 11, 1796	Vacant	2	4th	2	Vacant	Jun 1, 1796 – Jun 11, 1796	Vacant		
3	Benjamin Goodhue (Salem)	Federalist	Jun 11, 1796 – Nov 8, 1800	Elected to finish Cabot's term.	2	4th	2	Elected to finish Strong's term. Retired to run for the U.S. House of Representatives.	Jun 11, 1796 – Mar 3, 1799	Federalist	Theodore Sedgwick (Great Barrington)	2
3	Benjamin Goodhue (Salem)	Federalist	Jun 11, 1796 – Nov 8, 1800	Also elected to full term in 1796. Resigned.	3	5th	2	Elected to finish Strong's term. Retired to run for the U.S. House of Representatives.	Jun 11, 1796 – Mar 3, 1799	Federalist	Theodore Sedgwick (Great Barrington)	2
3	Benjamin Goodhue (Salem)	Federalist	Jun 11, 1796 – Nov 8, 1800	Also elected to full term in 1796. Resigned.	3	6th	3	Elected in 1798. Resigned to become U.S. Secretary of War.	Mar 4, 1799 – May 30, 1800	Federalist	Samuel Dexter (Lunenburg)	3
3	Benjamin Goodhue (Salem)	Federalist	Jun 11, 1796 – Nov 8, 1800	Also elected to full term in 1796. Resigned.	3	6th	3	Vacant	May 31, 1800 – Jun 5, 1800	Vacant		
3	Benjamin Goodhue (Salem)	Federalist	Jun 11, 1796 – Nov 8, 1800	Also elected to full term in 1796. Resigned.	3	6th	3	Elected to finish Dexter's term. Resigned.	Jun 6, 1800 – Mar 3, 1803	Federalist	Dwight Foster (Brookfield)	4
Vacant			Nov 8, 1800 – Nov 14, 1800	Vacant	3	6th	3	Elected to finish Dexter's term. Resigned.	Jun 6, 1800 – Mar 3, 1803	Federalist	Dwight Foster (Brookfield)	4
4	Jonathan Mason (Boston)	Federalist	Nov 14, 1800 – Mar 3, 1803	Elected to finish Goodhue's term.	3	6th	3	Elected to finish Dexter's term. Resigned.	Jun 6, 1800 – Mar 3, 1803	Federalist	Dwight Foster (Brookfield)	4
4	Jonathan Mason (Boston)	Federalist	Nov 14, 1800 – Mar 3, 1803	Elected to finish Goodhue's term.	3	7th	3	Elected to finish Dexter's term. Resigned.	Jun 6, 1800 – Mar 3, 1803	Federalist	Dwight Foster (Brookfield)	4
4	Jonathan Mason (Boston)	Federalist	Nov 14, 1800 – Mar 3, 1803	Elected to finish Goodhue's term.	3	7th	3	Vacant	Mar 2, 1803 – Mar 3, 1803	Vacant		
5	John Quincy Adams (Boston)	Federalist	Mar 4, 1803 – Jun 8, 1808	Elected in 1803. Resigned, having lost re-election to the next term.	4	8th	3	Elected to finish Dexter's term.	Mar 4, 1803 – Mar 3, 1811	Federalist	Timothy Pickering (Wenham)	5
5	John Quincy Adams (Boston)	Federalist	Mar 4, 1803 – Jun 8, 1808	Elected in 1803. Resigned, having lost re-election to the next term.	4	9th	4	Re-elected in 1805. Lost re-election.	Mar 4, 1803 – Mar 3, 1811	Federalist	Timothy Pickering (Wenham)	5
5	John Quincy Adams (Boston)	Federalist	Mar 4, 1803 – Jun 8, 1808	Elected in 1803. Resigned, having lost re-election to the next term.	4	10th	4	Re-elected in 1805. Lost re-election.	Mar 4, 1803 – Mar 3, 1811	Federalist	Timothy Pickering (Wenham)	5
6	James Lloyd (Boston)	Federalist	Jun 9, 1808 – May 1, 1813	Elected to finish Adams's term, having already been elected to the next term.	4	10th	4	Re-elected in 1805. Lost re-election.	Mar 4, 1803 – Mar 3, 1811	Federalist	Timothy Pickering (Wenham)	5
6	James Lloyd (Boston)	Federalist	Jun 9, 1808 – May 1, 1813	Elected in 1808. Resigned.	5	11th	4	Re-elected in 1805. Lost re-election.	Mar 4, 1803 – Mar 3, 1811	Federalist	Timothy Pickering (Wenham)	5
6	James Lloyd (Boston)	Federalist	Jun 9, 1808 – May 1, 1813	Elected in 1808. Resigned.	5	12th	5	State Senate failed to elect.	Mar 4, 1811 – Jun 28, 1811	Vacant		
6	James Lloyd (Boston)	Federalist	Jun 9, 1808 – May 1, 1813	Elected in 1808. Resigned.	5	12th	5	Elected in 1811, to finish the vacant term. Retired or lost re-election.	Jun 29, 1811 – Mar 3, 1817	Democratic- Republican	Joseph Bradley Varnum (Dracut)	6
6	James Lloyd (Boston)	Federalist	Jun 9, 1808 – May 1, 1813	Elected in 1808. Resigned.	5	13th	5	Elected in 1811, to finish the vacant term. Retired or lost re-election.	Jun 29, 1811 – Mar 3, 1817	Democratic- Republican	Joseph Bradley Varnum (Dracut)	6
Vacant			May 1, 1813 – May 5, 1813	Vacant	5	13th	5	Elected in 1811, to finish the vacant term. Retired or lost re-election.	Jun 29, 1811 – Mar 3, 1817	Democratic- Republican	Joseph Bradley Varnum (Dracut)	6
7	Christopher Gore (Boston)	Federalist	May 5, 1813 – May 30, 1816	Appointed to finish Lloyd's term.	5	13th	5	Elected in 1811, to finish the vacant term. Retired or lost re-election.	Jun 29, 1811 – Mar 3, 1817	Democratic- Republican	Joseph Bradley Varnum (Dracut)	6
7	Christopher Gore (Boston)	Federalist	May 5, 1813 – May 30, 1816	Elected to full term in 1815. Resigned.	6	14th	5	Elected in 1811, to finish the vacant term. Retired or lost re-election.	Jun 29, 1811 – Mar 3, 1817	Democratic- Republican	Joseph Bradley Varnum (Dracut)	6
Vacant			May 31, 1816 – Jun 11, 1816	Vacant	6	14th	5	Elected in 1811, to finish the vacant term. Retired or lost re-election.	Jun 29, 1811 – Mar 3, 1817	Democratic- Republican	Joseph Bradley Varnum (Dracut)	6
8	Eli P. Ashmun (Northampton)	Federalist	Jun 12, 1816 – May 10, 1818	Elected to finish Gore's term. Resigned.	6	14th	5	Elected in 1811, to finish the vacant term. Retired or lost re-election.	Jun 29, 1811 – Mar 3, 1817	Democratic- Republican	Joseph Bradley Varnum (Dracut)	6
8	Eli P. Ashmun (Northampton)	Federalist	Jun 12, 1816 – May 10, 1818	Elected to finish Gore's term. Resigned.	6	15th	6	Elected in 1816. Resigned to run for Mayor of Boston.	Mar 4, 1817 – May 30, 1822	Federalist	Harrison Gray Otis (Boston)	7
Vacant			May 11, 1818 – Jun 4, 1818	Vacant	6	15th	6	Elected in 1816. Resigned to run for Mayor of Boston.	Mar 4, 1817 – May 30, 1822	Federalist	Harrison Gray Otis (Boston)	7
9	Prentiss Mellen (Portland) (Note: Then part of the District of Maine.)	Federalist	Jun 5, 1818 – May 15, 1820	Elected to finish Gore's term. Resigned to become Chief Justice of Maine.	6	15th	6	Elected in 1816. Resigned to run for Mayor of Boston.	Mar 4, 1817 – May 30, 1822	Federalist	Harrison Gray Otis (Boston)	7
9	Prentiss Mellen (Portland)	Federalist	Jun 5, 1818 – May 15, 1820	Elected to finish Gore's term. Resigned to become Chief Justice of Maine.	6	16th	6	Elected in 1816. Resigned to run for Mayor of Boston.	Mar 4, 1817 – May 30, 1822	Federalist	Harrison Gray Otis (Boston)	7
Vacant			May 16, 1820 – Jun 12, 1820	Vacant	6	16th	6	Elected in 1816. Resigned to run for Mayor of Boston.	Mar 4, 1817 – May 30, 1822	Federalist	Harrison Gray Otis (Boston)	7
10	Elijah H. Mills (Northampton)	Federalist	Jun 12, 1820 – Mar 3, 1827	Elected to finish Gore's term.	6	16th	6	Elected in 1816. Resigned to run for Mayor of Boston.	Mar 4, 1817 – May 30, 1822	Federalist	Harrison Gray Otis (Boston)	7
10	Elijah H. Mills (Northampton)	Federalist	Jun 12, 1820 – Mar 3, 1827	Re-elected in 1820. Lost re-election in 1826.	7	17th	6	Elected in 1816. Resigned to run for Mayor of Boston.	Mar 4, 1817 – May 30, 1822	Federalist	Harrison Gray Otis (Boston)	7
10	Elijah H. Mills (Northampton)	Federalist	Jun 12, 1820 – Mar 3, 1827	Re-elected in 1820. Lost re-election in 1826.	7	17th	6	Vacant	May 30, 1822 – Jun 5, 1822	Vacant		
10	Elijah H. Mills (Northampton)	Federalist	Jun 12, 1820 – Mar 3, 1827	Re-elected in 1820. Lost re-election in 1826.	7	17th	6	Elected to finish Otis's term.	Jun 5, 1822 – May 23, 1826	Federalist	James Lloyd (Boston)	8
10	Elijah H. Mills (Northampton)	Federalist	Jun 12, 1820 – Mar 3, 1827	Re-elected in 1820. Lost re-election in 1826.	7	18th	7	Re-elected in 1822. Resigned.	Jun 5, 1822 – May 23, 1826	Federalist	James Lloyd (Boston)	8
10	Elijah H. Mills (Northampton)	National; Republican	Jun 12, 1820 – Mar 3, 1827	Re-elected in 1820. Lost re-election in 1826.	7	19th	7	Re-elected in 1822. Resigned.	Jun 5, 1822 – May 23, 1826	National; Republican	James Lloyd (Boston)	8
10	Elijah H. Mills (Northampton)	National; Republican	Jun 12, 1820 – Mar 3, 1827	Re-elected in 1820. Lost re-election in 1826.	7	19th	7	Vacant	May 23, 1826 – May 31, 1826	Vacant		
10	Elijah H. Mills (Northampton)	National; Republican	Jun 12, 1820 – Mar 3, 1827	Re-elected in 1820. Lost re-election in 1826.	7	19th	7	Elected to finish Lloyd's term.	May 31, 1826 – Mar 3, 1835	National; Republican	Nathaniel Silsbee (Salem)	9
Vacant			Mar 4, 1827 – Jun 8, 1827	Vacant	8	20th	7	Elected to finish Lloyd's term.	May 31, 1826 – Mar 3, 1835	National; Republican	Nathaniel Silsbee (Salem)	9
11	Daniel Webster (Boston)	National; Republican	Jun 8, 1827 – Feb 22, 1841	Elected late in 1827.	8	20th	7	Elected to finish Lloyd's term.	May 31, 1826 – Mar 3, 1835	National; Republican	Nathaniel Silsbee (Salem)	9
11	Daniel Webster (Boston)	National; Republican	Jun 8, 1827 – Feb 22, 1841	Elected late in 1827.	8	21st	8	Re-elected in 1828. Retired.	May 31, 1826 – Mar 3, 1835	National; Republican	Nathaniel Silsbee (Salem)	9
11	Daniel Webster (Boston)	National; Republican	Jun 8, 1827 – Feb 22, 1841	Elected late in 1827.	8	22nd	8	Re-elected in 1828. Retired.	May 31, 1826 – Mar 3, 1835	National; Republican	Nathaniel Silsbee (Salem)	9
11	Daniel Webster (Boston)	National; Republican	Jun 8, 1827 – Feb 22, 1841	Re-elected in 1833.	9	23rd	8	Re-elected in 1828. Retired.	May 31, 1826 – Mar 3, 1835	National; Republican	Nathaniel Silsbee (Salem)	9
11	Daniel Webster (Boston)	National; Republican	Jun 8, 1827 – Feb 22, 1841	Re-elected in 1833.	9	24th	9	Elected in 1835. Resigned to become Governor of Massachusetts.	Mar 4, 1835 – Jan 5, 1841	National; Republican	John Davis (Worcester)	10
11	Daniel Webster (Boston)	Whig	Jun 8, 1827 – Feb 22, 1841	Re-elected in 1833.	9	25th	9	Elected in 1835. Resigned to become Governor of Massachusetts.	Mar 4, 1835 – Jan 5, 1841	Whig	John Davis (Worcester)	10
11	Daniel Webster (Boston)	Whig	Jun 8, 1827 – Feb 22, 1841	Re-elected in 1839. Resigned to become U.S. Secretary of State.	10	26th	9	Elected in 1835. Resigned to become Governor of Massachusetts.	Mar 4, 1835 – Jan 5, 1841	Whig	John Davis (Worcester)	10
11	Daniel Webster (Boston)	Whig	Jun 8, 1827 – Feb 22, 1841	Re-elected in 1839. Resigned to become U.S. Secretary of State.	10	26th	9	Vacant	Jan 5, 1841 – Jan 13, 1841	Vacant		
11	Daniel Webster (Boston)	Whig	Jun 8, 1827 – Feb 22, 1841	Re-elected in 1839. Resigned to become U.S. Secretary of State.	10	26th	9	Elected to finish Davis's term.	Jan 13, 1841 – Mar 16, 1845	Whig	Isaac C. Bates (Northampton)	11
12	Rufus Choate (Boston)	Whig	Feb 23, 1841 – Mar 3, 1845	Elected to finish Webster's term. Retired.	10	26th	9	Elected to finish Davis's term.	Jan 13, 1841 – Mar 16, 1845	Whig	Isaac C. Bates (Northampton)	11
12	Rufus Choate (Boston)	Whig	Feb 23, 1841 – Mar 3, 1845	Elected to finish Webster's term. Retired.	10	27th	10	Elected to full term in 1841. Died.	Jan 13, 1841 – Mar 16, 1845	Whig	Isaac C. Bates (Northampton)	11
12	Rufus Choate (Boston)	Whig	Feb 23, 1841 – Mar 3, 1845	Elected to finish Webster's term. Retired.	10	28th	10	Elected to full term in 1841. Died.	Jan 13, 1841 – Mar 16, 1845	Whig	Isaac C. Bates (Northampton)	11
13	Daniel Webster (Boston)	Whig	Mar 4, 1845 – Jul 22, 1850	Elected in 1845. Resigned to become U.S. Secretary of State again.	11	29th	10	Elected to full term in 1841. Died.	Jan 13, 1841 – Mar 16, 1845	Whig	Isaac C. Bates (Northampton)	11
13	Daniel Webster (Boston)	Whig	Mar 4, 1845 – Jul 22, 1850	Elected in 1845. Resigned to become U.S. Secretary of State again.	11	29th	10	Vacant	Mar 16, 1845 – Mar 24, 1845	Vacant		
13	Daniel Webster (Boston)	Whig	Mar 4, 1845 – Jul 22, 1850	Elected in 1845. Resigned to become U.S. Secretary of State again.	11	29th	10	Elected to finish Bates's term.	Mar 24, 1845 – Mar 3, 1853	Whig	John Davis (Worcester)	12
13	Daniel Webster (Boston)	Whig	Mar 4, 1845 – Jul 22, 1850	Elected in 1845. Resigned to become U.S. Secretary of State again.	11	30th	11	Re-elected in 1847. Retired.	Mar 24, 1845 – Mar 3, 1853	Whig	John Davis (Worcester)	12
13	Daniel Webster (Boston)	Whig	Mar 4, 1845 – Jul 22, 1850	Elected in 1845. Resigned to become U.S. Secretary of State again.	11	31st	11	Re-elected in 1847. Retired.	Mar 24, 1845 – Mar 3, 1853	Whig	John Davis (Worcester)	12
Vacant			Jul 23, 1850 – Jul 30, 1850	Vacant	11	31st	11	Re-elected in 1847. Retired.	Mar 24, 1845 – Mar 3, 1853	Whig	John Davis (Worcester)	12
14	Robert C. Winthrop (Boston)	Whig	Jul 30, 1850 – Feb 1, 1851	Appointed to continue Webster's term. Lost election to finish Webster's term.	11	31st	11	Re-elected in 1847. Retired.	Mar 24, 1845 – Mar 3, 1853	Whig	John Davis (Worcester)	12
15	Robert Rantoul Jr. (Boston)	Democratic	Feb 1, 1851 – Mar 3, 1851	Elected to finish Webster's term. Retired.	11	31st	11	Re-elected in 1847. Retired.	Mar 24, 1845 – Mar 3, 1853	Whig	John Davis (Worcester)	12
Vacant			Mar 4, 1851 – Apr 24, 1851	Elected late after the state legislature deadlocked on Daniel Webster's successor	12	32nd	11	Re-elected in 1847. Retired.	Mar 24, 1845 – Mar 3, 1853	Whig	John Davis (Worcester)	12
16	Charles Sumner (Boston)	Free Soil	Apr 24, 1851 – Mar 11, 1874	Elected late after the state legislature deadlocked on Daniel Webster's successor	12	32nd	11	Re-elected in 1847. Retired.	Mar 24, 1845 – Mar 3, 1853	Whig	John Davis (Worcester)	12
16	Charles Sumner (Boston)	Free Soil	Apr 24, 1851 – Mar 11, 1874	Elected late after the state legislature deadlocked on Daniel Webster's successor	12	33rd	12	Elected in 1853. Resigned.	Mar 4, 1853 – Jun 1, 1854	Whig	Edward Everett (Boston)	13
16	Charles Sumner (Boston)	Free Soil	Apr 24, 1851 – Mar 11, 1874	Elected late after the state legislature deadlocked on Daniel Webster's successor	12	33rd	12	Vacant	Jun 1, 1854 – Jun 3, 1854	Vacant		
16	Charles Sumner (Boston)	Free Soil	Apr 24, 1851 – Mar 11, 1874	Elected late after the state legislature deadlocked on Daniel Webster's successor	12	33rd	12	Appointed to continue Everett's term. Successor was elected.	Jun 3, 1854 – Jan 31, 1855	Whig	Julius Rockwell (Pittsfield)	14
16	Charles Sumner (Boston)	Free Soil	Apr 24, 1851 – Mar 11, 1874	Elected late after the state legislature deadlocked on Daniel Webster's successor	12	33rd	12	Elected to finish Everett's term.	Jan 31, 1855 – Mar 3, 1873	Know Nothing	Henry Wilson (Natick)	15
16	Charles Sumner (Boston)	Free Soil	Apr 24, 1851 – Mar 11, 1874	Elected late after the state legislature deadlocked on Daniel Webster's successor	12	34th	12	Elected to finish Everett's term.	Jan 31, 1855 – Mar 3, 1873	Republican	Henry Wilson (Natick)	15
16	Charles Sumner (Boston)	Republican	Apr 24, 1851 – Mar 11, 1874	Re-elected in 1857.	13	35th	12	Elected to finish Everett's term.	Jan 31, 1855 – Mar 3, 1873	Republican	Henry Wilson (Natick)	15
16	Charles Sumner (Boston)	Republican	Apr 24, 1851 – Mar 11, 1874	Re-elected in 1857.	13	36th	13	Re-elected in 1859.	Jan 31, 1855 – Mar 3, 1873	Republican	Henry Wilson (Natick)	15
16	Charles Sumner (Boston)	Republican	Apr 24, 1851 – Mar 11, 1874	Re-elected in 1857.	13	37th	13	Re-elected in 1859.	Jan 31, 1855 – Mar 3, 1873	Republican	Henry Wilson (Natick)	15
16	Charles Sumner (Boston)	Republican	Apr 24, 1851 – Mar 11, 1874	Re-elected in 1863.	14	38th	13	Re-elected in 1859.	Jan 31, 1855 – Mar 3, 1873	Republican	Henry Wilson (Natick)	15
16	Charles Sumner (Boston)	Republican	Apr 24, 1851 – Mar 11, 1874	Re-elected in 1863.	14	39th	14	Re-elected in 1865.	Jan 31, 1855 – Mar 3, 1873	Republican	Henry Wilson (Natick)	15
16	Charles Sumner (Boston)	Republican	Apr 24, 1851 – Mar 11, 1874	Re-elected in 1863.	14	40th	14	Re-elected in 1865.	Jan 31, 1855 – Mar 3, 1873	Republican	Henry Wilson (Natick)	15
16	Charles Sumner (Boston)	Republican	Apr 24, 1851 – Mar 11, 1874	Re-elected in 1869. Died.	15	41st	14	Re-elected in 1865.	Jan 31, 1855 – Mar 3, 1873	Republican	Henry Wilson (Natick)	15
16	Charles Sumner (Boston)	Republican	Apr 24, 1851 – Mar 11, 1874	Re-elected in 1869. Died.	15	42nd	15	Re-elected in 1871. Resigned to become the Vice President of the United States.	Jan 31, 1855 – Mar 3, 1873	Republican	Henry Wilson (Natick)	15
16	Charles Sumner (Boston)	Liberal Republican	Apr 24, 1851 – Mar 11, 1874	Re-elected in 1869. Died.	15	43rd	15	Vacant	Mar 3, 1873 – Mar 17, 1873	Vacant		
16	Charles Sumner (Boston)	Liberal Republican	Apr 24, 1851 – Mar 11, 1874	Re-elected in 1869. Died.	15	43rd	15	Elected to finish Wilson's term. Lost renomination.	Mar 17, 1873 – Mar 3, 1877	Republican	George S. Boutwell (Groton)	16
Vacant			Mar 12, 1874 – Apr 16, 1874	Vacant	15	43rd	15	Elected to finish Wilson's term. Lost renomination.	Mar 17, 1873 – Mar 3, 1877	Republican	George S. Boutwell (Groton)	16
17	William B. Washburn (Greenfield)	Republican	Apr 17, 1874 – Mar 3, 1875	Elected to finish Sumner's term. Retired.	15	43rd	15	Elected to finish Wilson's term. Lost renomination.	Mar 17, 1873 – Mar 3, 1877	Republican	George S. Boutwell (Groton)	16
18	Henry L. Dawes (Pittsfield)	Republican	Mar 4, 1875 – Mar 3, 1893	Elected in 1875.	16	44th	15	Elected to finish Wilson's term. Lost renomination.	Mar 17, 1873 – Mar 3, 1877	Republican	George S. Boutwell (Groton)	16
18	Henry L. Dawes (Pittsfield)	Republican	Mar 4, 1875 – Mar 3, 1893	Elected in 1875.	16	45th	16	Elected in 1877.	Mar 4, 1877 – Sep 30, 1904	Republican	George F. Hoar (Worcester)	17
18	Henry L. Dawes (Pittsfield)	Republican	Mar 4, 1875 – Mar 3, 1893	Elected in 1875.	16	46th	16	Elected in 1877.	Mar 4, 1877 – Sep 30, 1904	Republican	George F. Hoar (Worcester)	17
18	Henry L. Dawes (Pittsfield)	Republican	Mar 4, 1875 – Mar 3, 1893	Re-elected in 1881.	17	47th	16	Elected in 1877.	Mar 4, 1877 – Sep 30, 1904	Republican	George F. Hoar (Worcester)	17
18	Henry L. Dawes (Pittsfield)	Republican	Mar 4, 1875 – Mar 3, 1893	Re-elected in 1881.	17	48th	17	Re-elected in 1883.	Mar 4, 1877 – Sep 30, 1904	Republican	George F. Hoar (Worcester)	17
18	Henry L. Dawes (Pittsfield)	Republican	Mar 4, 1875 – Mar 3, 1893	Re-elected in 1881.	17	49th	17	Re-elected in 1883.	Mar 4, 1877 – Sep 30, 1904	Republican	George F. Hoar (Worcester)	17
18	Henry L. Dawes (Pittsfield)	Republican	Mar 4, 1875 – Mar 3, 1893	Re-elected in 1887. Retired.	18	50th	17	Re-elected in 1883.	Mar 4, 1877 – Sep 30, 1904	Republican	George F. Hoar (Worcester)	17
18	Henry L. Dawes (Pittsfield)	Republican	Mar 4, 1875 – Mar 3, 1893	Re-elected in 1887. Retired.	18	51st	18	Re-elected in 1889.	Mar 4, 1877 – Sep 30, 1904	Republican	George F. Hoar (Worcester)	17
18	Henry L. Dawes (Pittsfield)	Republican	Mar 4, 1875 – Mar 3, 1893	Re-elected in 1887. Retired.	18	52nd	18	Re-elected in 1889.	Mar 4, 1877 – Sep 30, 1904	Republican	George F. Hoar (Worcester)	17
19	Henry Cabot Lodge (Nahant)	Republican	Mar 4, 1893 – Nov 9, 1924	Elected in 1893.	19	53rd	18	Re-elected in 1889.	Mar 4, 1877 – Sep 30, 1904	Republican	George F. Hoar (Worcester)	17
19	Henry Cabot Lodge (Nahant)	Republican	Mar 4, 1893 – Nov 9, 1924	Elected in 1893.	19	54th	19	Re-elected in 1895.	Mar 4, 1877 – Sep 30, 1904	Republican	George F. Hoar (Worcester)	17
19	Henry Cabot Lodge (Nahant)	Republican	Mar 4, 1893 – Nov 9, 1924	Elected in 1893.	19	55th	19	Re-elected in 1895.	Mar 4, 1877 – Sep 30, 1904	Republican	George F. Hoar (Worcester)	17
19	Henry Cabot Lodge (Nahant)	Republican	Mar 4, 1893 – Nov 9, 1924	Re-elected in 1899.	20	56th	19	Re-elected in 1895.	Mar 4, 1877 – Sep 30, 1904	Republican	George F. Hoar (Worcester)	17
19	Henry Cabot Lodge (Nahant)	Republican	Mar 4, 1893 – Nov 9, 1924	Re-elected in 1899.	20	57th	20	Re-elected in 1901. Died.	Mar 4, 1877 – Sep 30, 1904	Republican	George F. Hoar (Worcester)	17
19	Henry Cabot Lodge (Nahant)	Republican	Mar 4, 1893 – Nov 9, 1924	Re-elected in 1899.	20	58th	20	Re-elected in 1901. Died.	Mar 4, 1877 – Sep 30, 1904	Republican	George F. Hoar (Worcester)	17
19	Henry Cabot Lodge (Nahant)	Republican	Mar 4, 1893 – Nov 9, 1924	Re-elected in 1899.	20	58th	20	Vacant	Sep 30, 1904 – Oct 12, 1904	Vacant		
19	Henry Cabot Lodge (Nahant)	Republican	Mar 4, 1893 – Nov 9, 1924	Re-elected in 1899.	20	58th	20	Appointed to continue Hoar's term. Elected to finish Hoar's term.	Oct 12, 1904 – Mar 3, 1913	Republican	Winthrop M. Crane (Dalton)	18
19	Henry Cabot Lodge (Nahant)	Republican	Mar 4, 1893 – Nov 9, 1924	Re-elected in 1905.	21	59th	20	Appointed to continue Hoar's term. Elected to finish Hoar's term.	Oct 12, 1904 – Mar 3, 1913	Republican	Winthrop M. Crane (Dalton)	18
19	Henry Cabot Lodge (Nahant)	Republican	Mar 4, 1893 – Nov 9, 1924	Re-elected in 1905.	21	60th	21	Re-elected in 1907. Retired.	Oct 12, 1904 – Mar 3, 1913	Republican	Winthrop M. Crane (Dalton)	18
19	Henry Cabot Lodge (Nahant)	Republican	Mar 4, 1893 – Nov 9, 1924	Re-elected in 1905.	21	61st	21	Re-elected in 1907. Retired.	Oct 12, 1904 – Mar 3, 1913	Republican	Winthrop M. Crane (Dalton)	18
19	Henry Cabot Lodge (Nahant)	Republican	Mar 4, 1893 – Nov 9, 1924	Re-elected in 1911.	22	62nd	21	Re-elected in 1907. Retired.	Oct 12, 1904 – Mar 3, 1913	Republican	Winthrop M. Crane (Dalton)	18
19	Henry Cabot Lodge (Nahant)	Republican	Mar 4, 1893 – Nov 9, 1924	Re-elected in 1911.	22	63rd	22	Elected in 1913. Lost re-election.	Mar 4, 1913 – Mar 3, 1919	Republican	John W. Weeks (West Newton)	19
19	Henry Cabot Lodge (Nahant)	Republican	Mar 4, 1893 – Nov 9, 1924	Re-elected in 1911.	22	64th	22	Elected in 1913. Lost re-election.	Mar 4, 1913 – Mar 3, 1919	Republican	John W. Weeks (West Newton)	19
19	Henry Cabot Lodge (Nahant)	Republican	Mar 4, 1893 – Nov 9, 1924	Re-elected in 1916.	23	65th	22	Elected in 1913. Lost re-election.	Mar 4, 1913 – Mar 3, 1919	Republican	John W. Weeks (West Newton)	19
19	Henry Cabot Lodge (Nahant)	Republican	Mar 4, 1893 – Nov 9, 1924	Re-elected in 1916.	23	66th	23	Elected in 1918. Lost re-election.	Mar 4, 1919 – Mar 3, 1925	Democratic	David I. Walsh (Fitchburg)	20
19	Henry Cabot Lodge (Nahant)	Republican	Mar 4, 1893 – Nov 9, 1924	Re-elected in 1916.	23	67th	23	Elected in 1918. Lost re-election.	Mar 4, 1919 – Mar 3, 1925	Democratic	David I. Walsh (Fitchburg)	20
19	Henry Cabot Lodge (Nahant)	Republican	Mar 4, 1893 – Nov 9, 1924	Re-elected in 1922. Died.	24	68th	23	Elected in 1918. Lost re-election.	Mar 4, 1919 – Mar 3, 1925	Democratic	David I. Walsh (Fitchburg)	20
Vacant			Nov 9, 1924 – Nov 13, 1924	Vacant	24	68th	23	Elected in 1918. Lost re-election.	Mar 4, 1919 – Mar 3, 1925	Democratic	David I. Walsh (Fitchburg)	20
20	William M. Butler (Boston)	Republican	Nov 13, 1924 – Dec 6, 1926	Appointed to continue Lodge's term. Lost election to finish Lodge's term.	24	68th	23	Elected in 1918. Lost re-election.	Mar 4, 1919 – Mar 3, 1925	Democratic	David I. Walsh (Fitchburg)	20
20	William M. Butler (Boston)	Republican	Nov 13, 1924 – Dec 6, 1926	Appointed to continue Lodge's term. Lost election to finish Lodge's term.	24	69th	24	Elected in 1924. Retired.	Mar 4, 1925 – Mar 3, 1931	Republican	Frederick H. Gillett (Springfield)	21
21	David I. Walsh (Clinton)	Democratic	Dec 6, 1926 – Jan 3, 1947	Elected to finish Lodge's term.	24	69th	24	Elected in 1924. Retired.	Mar 4, 1925 – Mar 3, 1931	Republican	Frederick H. Gillett (Springfield)	21
21	David I. Walsh (Clinton)	Democratic	Dec 6, 1926 – Jan 3, 1947	Elected to finish Lodge's term.	24	70th	24	Elected in 1924. Retired.	Mar 4, 1925 – Mar 3, 1931	Republican	Frederick H. Gillett (Springfield)	21
21	David I. Walsh (Clinton)	Democratic	Dec 6, 1926 – Jan 3, 1947	Re-elected in 1928.	25	71st	24	Elected in 1924. Retired.	Mar 4, 1925 – Mar 3, 1931	Republican	Frederick H. Gillett (Springfield)	21
21	David I. Walsh (Clinton)	Democratic	Dec 6, 1926 – Jan 3, 1947	Re-elected in 1928.	25	72nd	25	Elected in 1930. Retired.	Mar 4, 1931 – Jan 3, 1937	Democratic	Marcus A. Coolidge (Fitchburg)	22
21	David I. Walsh (Clinton)	Democratic	Dec 6, 1926 – Jan 3, 1947	Re-elected in 1928.	25	73rd	25	Elected in 1930. Retired.	Mar 4, 1931 – Jan 3, 1937	Democratic	Marcus A. Coolidge (Fitchburg)	22
21	David I. Walsh (Clinton)	Democratic	Dec 6, 1926 – Jan 3, 1947	Re-elected in 1934.	26	74th	25	Elected in 1930. Retired.	Mar 4, 1931 – Jan 3, 1937	Democratic	Marcus A. Coolidge (Fitchburg)	22
21	David I. Walsh (Clinton)	Democratic	Dec 6, 1926 – Jan 3, 1947	Re-elected in 1934.	26	75th	26	Elected in 1936.	Jan 3, 1937 – Feb 3, 1944	Republican	Henry Cabot Lodge Jr. (Beverly)	23
21	David I. Walsh (Clinton)	Democratic	Dec 6, 1926 – Jan 3, 1947	Re-elected in 1934.	26	76th	26	Elected in 1936.	Jan 3, 1937 – Feb 3, 1944	Republican	Henry Cabot Lodge Jr. (Beverly)	23
21	David I. Walsh (Clinton)	Democratic	Dec 6, 1926 – Jan 3, 1947	Re-elected in 1940. Lost re-election.	27	77th	26	Elected in 1936.	Jan 3, 1937 – Feb 3, 1944	Republican	Henry Cabot Lodge Jr. (Beverly)	23
21	David I. Walsh (Clinton)	Democratic	Dec 6, 1926 – Jan 3, 1947	Re-elected in 1940. Lost re-election.	27	78th	27	Re-elected in 1942. Resigned to return to active duty in the U.S. Army.	Jan 3, 1937 – Feb 3, 1944	Republican	Henry Cabot Lodge Jr. (Beverly)	23
21	David I. Walsh (Clinton)	Democratic	Dec 6, 1926 – Jan 3, 1947	Re-elected in 1940. Lost re-election.	27	78th	27	Vacant	Feb 4, 1944 – Feb 7, 1944	Vacant		
21	David I. Walsh (Clinton)	Democratic	Dec 6, 1926 – Jan 3, 1947	Re-elected in 1940. Lost re-election.	27	78th	27	Appointed to continue Lodge's term. Retired when his successor was elected.	Feb 8, 1944 – Dec 19, 1944	Republican	Sinclair Weeks (West Newton)	24
21	David I. Walsh (Clinton)	Democratic	Dec 6, 1926 – Jan 3, 1947	Re-elected in 1940. Lost re-election.	27	78th	27	Elected to finish Lodge's term. Didn't take seat until Jan 4, 1945 in order to remain Governor of Massachusetts.	Dec 19, 1944 – Jan 3, 1967	Republican	Leverett Saltonstall (Dover)	25
21	David I. Walsh (Clinton)	Democratic	Dec 6, 1926 – Jan 3, 1947	Re-elected in 1940. Lost re-election.	27	79th	27	Elected to finish Lodge's term. Didn't take seat until Jan 4, 1945 in order to remain Governor of Massachusetts.	Dec 19, 1944 – Jan 3, 1967	Republican	Leverett Saltonstall (Dover)	25
22	Henry Cabot Lodge Jr. (Beverly)	Republican	Jan 3, 1947 – Jan 3, 1953	Elected in 1946. Lost re-election.	28	80th	27	Elected to finish Lodge's term. Didn't take seat until Jan 4, 1945 in order to remain Governor of Massachusetts.	Dec 19, 1944 – Jan 3, 1967	Republican	Leverett Saltonstall (Dover)	25
22	Henry Cabot Lodge Jr. (Beverly)	Republican	Jan 3, 1947 – Jan 3, 1953	Elected in 1946. Lost re-election.	28	81st	28	Re-elected in 1948.	Dec 19, 1944 – Jan 3, 1967	Republican	Leverett Saltonstall (Dover)	25
22	Henry Cabot Lodge Jr. (Beverly)	Republican	Jan 3, 1947 – Jan 3, 1953	Elected in 1946. Lost re-election.	28	82nd	28	Re-elected in 1948.	Dec 19, 1944 – Jan 3, 1967	Republican	Leverett Saltonstall (Dover)	25
23	John F. Kennedy (Boston)	Democratic	Jan 3, 1953 – Dec 22, 1960	Elected in 1952.	29	83rd	28	Re-elected in 1948.	Dec 19, 1944 – Jan 3, 1967	Republican	Leverett Saltonstall (Dover)	25
23	John F. Kennedy (Boston)	Democratic	Jan 3, 1953 – Dec 22, 1960	Elected in 1952.	29	84th	29	Re-elected in 1954.	Dec 19, 1944 – Jan 3, 1967	Republican	Leverett Saltonstall (Dover)	25
23	John F. Kennedy (Boston)	Democratic	Jan 3, 1953 – Dec 22, 1960	Elected in 1952.	29	85th	29	Re-elected in 1954.	Dec 19, 1944 – Jan 3, 1967	Republican	Leverett Saltonstall (Dover)	25
23	John F. Kennedy (Boston)	Democratic	Jan 3, 1953 – Dec 22, 1960	Re-elected in 1958. Resigned, having been elected President of the United States.	30	86th	29	Re-elected in 1954.	Dec 19, 1944 – Jan 3, 1967	Republican	Leverett Saltonstall (Dover)	25
Vacant			Dec 22, 1960 – Dec 27, 1960	Vacant	30	86th	29	Re-elected in 1954.	Dec 19, 1944 – Jan 3, 1967	Republican	Leverett Saltonstall (Dover)	25
24	Benjamin Smith (Gloucester)	Democratic	Dec 27, 1960 – Nov 7, 1962	Appointed to continue John Kennedy's term. Retired when his successor was elected.	30	86th	29	Re-elected in 1954.	Dec 19, 1944 – Jan 3, 1967	Republican	Leverett Saltonstall (Dover)	25
24	Benjamin Smith (Gloucester)	Democratic	Dec 27, 1960 – Nov 7, 1962	Appointed to continue John Kennedy's term. Retired when his successor was elected.	30	87th	30	Re-elected in 1960. Retired.	Dec 19, 1944 – Jan 3, 1967	Republican	Leverett Saltonstall (Dover)	25
25	Ted Kennedy (Barnstable)	Democratic	Nov 7, 1962 – Aug 25, 2009	Elected to finish his brother's term.	30	87th	30	Re-elected in 1960. Retired.	Dec 19, 1944 – Jan 3, 1967	Republican	Leverett Saltonstall (Dover)	25
25	Ted Kennedy (Barnstable)	Democratic	Nov 7, 1962 – Aug 25, 2009	Elected to finish his brother's term.	30	88th	30	Re-elected in 1960. Retired.	Dec 19, 1944 – Jan 3, 1967	Republican	Leverett Saltonstall (Dover)	25
25	Ted Kennedy (Barnstable)	Democratic	Nov 7, 1962 – Aug 25, 2009	Re-elected in 1964.	31	89th	30	Re-elected in 1960. Retired.	Dec 19, 1944 – Jan 3, 1967	Republican	Leverett Saltonstall (Dover)	25
25	Ted Kennedy (Barnstable)	Democratic	Nov 7, 1962 – Aug 25, 2009	Re-elected in 1964.	31	90th	31	Elected in 1966.	Jan 3, 1967 – Jan 3, 1979	Republican	Edward Brooke (Newton)	26
25	Ted Kennedy (Barnstable)	Democratic	Nov 7, 1962 – Aug 25, 2009	Re-elected in 1964.	31	91st	31	Elected in 1966.	Jan 3, 1967 – Jan 3, 1979	Republican	Edward Brooke (Newton)	26
25	Ted Kennedy (Barnstable)	Democratic	Nov 7, 1962 – Aug 25, 2009	Re-elected in 1970.	32	92nd	31	Elected in 1966.	Jan 3, 1967 – Jan 3, 1979	Republican	Edward Brooke (Newton)	26
25	Ted Kennedy (Barnstable)	Democratic	Nov 7, 1962 – Aug 25, 2009	Re-elected in 1970.	32	93rd	32	Re-elected in 1972. Lost re-election.	Jan 3, 1967 – Jan 3, 1979	Republican	Edward Brooke (Newton)	26
25	Ted Kennedy (Barnstable)	Democratic	Nov 7, 1962 – Aug 25, 2009	Re-elected in 1970.	32	94th	32	Re-elected in 1972. Lost re-election.	Jan 3, 1967 – Jan 3, 1979	Republican	Edward Brooke (Newton)	26
25	Ted Kennedy (Barnstable)	Democratic	Nov 7, 1962 – Aug 25, 2009	Re-elected in 1976.	33	95th	32	Re-elected in 1972. Lost re-election.	Jan 3, 1967 – Jan 3, 1979	Republican	Edward Brooke (Newton)	26
25	Ted Kennedy (Barnstable)	Democratic	Nov 7, 1962 – Aug 25, 2009	Re-elected in 1976.	33	96th	33	Elected in 1978. Retired and resigned early to give successor preferential seniority.	Jan 3, 1979 – Jan 2, 1985	Democratic	Paul Tsongas (Lowell)	27
25	Ted Kennedy (Barnstable)	Democratic	Nov 7, 1962 – Aug 25, 2009	Re-elected in 1976.	33	97th	33	Elected in 1978. Retired and resigned early to give successor preferential seniority.	Jan 3, 1979 – Jan 2, 1985	Democratic	Paul Tsongas (Lowell)	27
25	Ted Kennedy (Barnstable)	Democratic	Nov 7, 1962 – Aug 25, 2009	Re-elected in 1982.	34	98th	33	Elected in 1978. Retired and resigned early to give successor preferential seniority.	Jan 3, 1979 – Jan 2, 1985	Democratic	Paul Tsongas (Lowell)	27
25	Ted Kennedy (Barnstable)	Democratic	Nov 7, 1962 – Aug 25, 2009	Re-elected in 1982.	34	98th	33	Appointed to finish Tsongas's term, having already been elected to the next term.	Jan 2, 1985 – Feb 1, 2013	Democratic	John Kerry (Boston)	28
25	Ted Kennedy (Barnstable)	Democratic	Nov 7, 1962 – Aug 25, 2009	Re-elected in 1982.	34	99th	34	Elected in 1984.	Jan 2, 1985 – Feb 1, 2013	Democratic	John Kerry (Boston)	28
25	Ted Kennedy (Barnstable)	Democratic	Nov 7, 1962 – Aug 25, 2009	Re-elected in 1982.	34	100th	34	Elected in 1984.	Jan 2, 1985 – Feb 1, 2013	Democratic	John Kerry (Boston)	28
25	Ted Kennedy (Barnstable)	Democratic	Nov 7, 1962 – Aug 25, 2009	Re-elected in 1988.	35	101st	34	Elected in 1984.	Jan 2, 1985 – Feb 1, 2013	Democratic	John Kerry (Boston)	28
25	Ted Kennedy (Barnstable)	Democratic	Nov 7, 1962 – Aug 25, 2009	Re-elected in 1988.	35	102nd	35	Re-elected in 1990.	Jan 2, 1985 – Feb 1, 2013	Democratic	John Kerry (Boston)	28
25	Ted Kennedy (Barnstable)	Democratic	Nov 7, 1962 – Aug 25, 2009	Re-elected in 1988.	35	103rd	35	Re-elected in 1990.	Jan 2, 1985 – Feb 1, 2013	Democratic	John Kerry (Boston)	28
25	Ted Kennedy (Barnstable)	Democratic	Nov 7, 1962 – Aug 25, 2009	Re-elected in 1994.	36	104th	35	Re-elected in 1990.	Jan 2, 1985 – Feb 1, 2013	Democratic	John Kerry (Boston)	28
25	Ted Kennedy (Barnstable)	Democratic	Nov 7, 1962 – Aug 25, 2009	Re-elected in 1994.	36	105th	36	Re-elected in 1996.	Jan 2, 1985 – Feb 1, 2013	Democratic	John Kerry (Boston)	28
25	Ted Kennedy (Barnstable)	Democratic	Nov 7, 1962 – Aug 25, 2009	Re-elected in 1994.	36	106th	36	Re-elected in 1996.	Jan 2, 1985 – Feb 1, 2013	Democratic	John Kerry (Boston)	28
25	Ted Kennedy (Barnstable)	Democratic	Nov 7, 1962 – Aug 25, 2009	Re-elected in 2000.	37	107th	36	Re-elected in 1996.	Jan 2, 1985 – Feb 1, 2013	Democratic	John Kerry (Boston)	28
25	Ted Kennedy (Barnstable)	Democratic	Nov 7, 1962 – Aug 25, 2009	Re-elected in 2000.	37	108th	37	Re-elected in 2002.	Jan 2, 1985 – Feb 1, 2013	Democratic	John Kerry (Boston)	28
25	Ted Kennedy (Barnstable)	Democratic	Nov 7, 1962 – Aug 25, 2009	Re-elected in 2000.	37	109th	37	Re-elected in 2002.	Jan 2, 1985 – Feb 1, 2013	Democratic	John Kerry (Boston)	28
25	Ted Kennedy (Barnstable)	Democratic	Nov 7, 1962 – Aug 25, 2009	Re-elected in 2006. Died.	38	110th	37	Re-elected in 2002.	Jan 2, 1985 – Feb 1, 2013	Democratic	John Kerry (Boston)	28
25	Ted Kennedy (Barnstable)	Democratic	Nov 7, 1962 – Aug 25, 2009	Re-elected in 2006. Died.	38	111th	38	Re-elected in 2008. Resigned to become U.S. Secretary of State.	Jan 2, 1985 – Feb 1, 2013	Democratic	John Kerry (Boston)	28
Vacant			Aug 25, 2009 – Sep 24, 2009	Vacant	38	111th	38	Re-elected in 2008. Resigned to become U.S. Secretary of State.	Jan 2, 1985 – Feb 1, 2013	Democratic	John Kerry (Boston)	28
26	Paul G. Kirk (Marstons Mills)	Democratic	Sep 24, 2009 – Feb 4, 2010	Appointed to continue Ted Kennedy's term. Was not a candidate to finish the term. Successor qualified.	38	111th	38	Re-elected in 2008. Resigned to become U.S. Secretary of State.	Jan 2, 1985 – Feb 1, 2013	Democratic	John Kerry (Boston)	28
27	Scott Brown (Wrentham)	Republican	Feb 4, 2010 – Jan 3, 2013	Elected to finish Ted Kennedy's term. Lost re-election.	38	111th	38	Re-elected in 2008. Resigned to become U.S. Secretary of State.	Jan 2, 1985 – Feb 1, 2013	Democratic	John Kerry (Boston)	28
27	Scott Brown (Wrentham)	Republican	Feb 4, 2010 – Jan 3, 2013	Elected to finish Ted Kennedy's term. Lost re-election.	38	112th	38	Re-elected in 2008. Resigned to become U.S. Secretary of State.	Jan 2, 1985 – Feb 1, 2013	Democratic	John Kerry (Boston)	28
28	Elizabeth Warren (Cambridge)	Democratic	Jan 3, 2013 – present	Elected in 2012.	39	113th	38	Re-elected in 2008. Resigned to become U.S. Secretary of State.	Jan 2, 1985 – Feb 1, 2013	Democratic	John Kerry (Boston)	28
28	Elizabeth Warren (Cambridge)	Democratic	Jan 3, 2013 – present	Elected in 2012.	39	113th	38	Appointed to continue Kerry's term. Retired when his successor was elected.	Feb 1, 2013 – Jul 15, 2013	Democratic	Mo Cowan (Stoughton)	29
28	Elizabeth Warren (Cambridge)	Democratic	Jan 3, 2013 – present	Elected in 2012.	39	113th	38	Elected to finish Kerry's term.	Jul 16, 2013 – present	Democratic	Ed Markey (Malden)	30
28	Elizabeth Warren (Cambridge)	Democratic	Jan 3, 2013 – present	Elected in 2012.	39	114th	39	Re-elected in 2014.	Jul 16, 2013 – present	Democratic	Ed Markey (Malden)	30
28	Elizabeth Warren (Cambridge)	Democratic	Jan 3, 2013 – present	Elected in 2012.	39	115th	39	Re-elected in 2014.	Jul 16, 2013 – present	Democratic	Ed Markey (Malden)	30
28	Elizabeth Warren (Cambridge)	Democratic	Jan 3, 2013 – present	Re-elected in 2018.	40	116th	39	Re-elected in 2014.	Jul 16, 2013 – present	Democratic	Ed Markey (Malden)	30
28	Elizabeth Warren (Cambridge)	Democratic	Jan 3, 2013 – present	Re-elected in 2018.	40	117th	40	Re-elected in 2020.	Jul 16, 2013 – present	Democratic	Ed Markey (Malden)	30
28	Elizabeth Warren (Cambridge)	Democratic	Jan 3, 2013 – present	Re-elected in 2018.	40	118th	40	Re-elected in 2020.	Jul 16, 2013 – present	Democratic	Ed Markey (Malden)	30
28	Elizabeth Warren (Cambridge)	Democratic	Jan 3, 2013 – present	Re-elected in 2024.	41	119th	40	Re-elected in 2020.	Jul 16, 2013 – present	Democratic	Ed Markey (Malden)	30
28	Elizabeth Warren (Cambridge)	Democratic	Jan 3, 2013 – present	Re-elected in 2024.	41	120th	41	Re-elected in 2026. Retiring at the end of term.	Jul 16, 2013 – present	Democratic	Ed Markey (Malden)	30
28	Elizabeth Warren (Cambridge)	Democratic	Jan 3, 2013 – present	Re-elected in 2024.	41	121st	41	Re-elected in 2026. Retiring at the end of term.	Jul 16, 2013 – present	Democratic	Ed Markey (Malden)	30
To be determined in the 2030 election.					42	122nd	41	Re-elected in 2026. Retiring at the end of term.	Jul 16, 2013 – present	Democratic	Ed Markey (Malden)	30
To be determined in the 2030 election.					42	123rd	42	To be determined in the 2032 election.				

== See also ==
- Elections in Massachusetts
- List of United States representatives from Massachusetts
- Massachusetts's congressional delegations
