= 1870–71 United States Senate elections =

- Dates vary by state (And other dates for special elections)
- Class 2

25 of the 70 (4 vacant)/74 seats in the United States Senate (with special elections) 36 seats needed for a majority
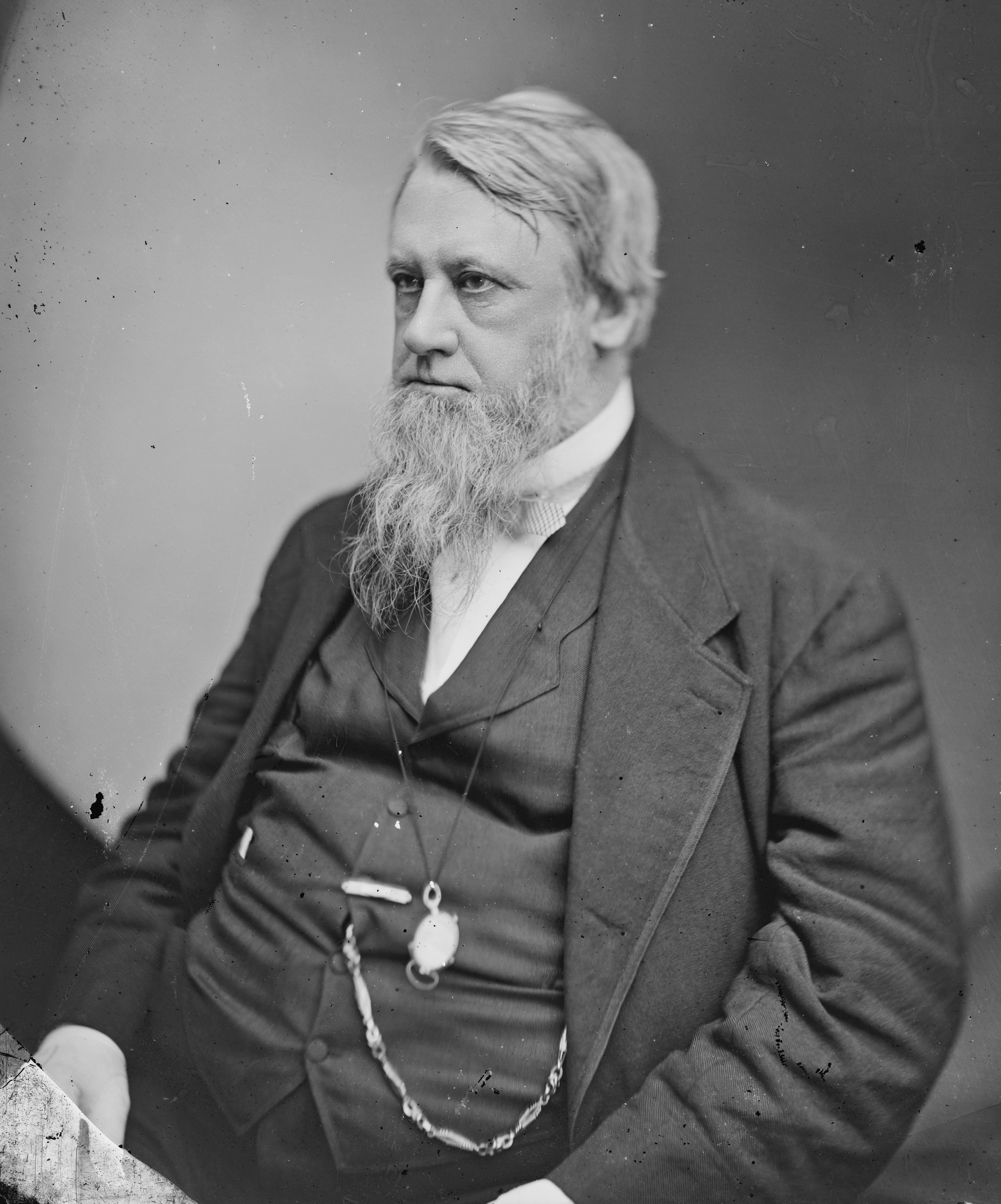

	Majority party	Minority party
Leader	Henry B. Anthony (Note: as Republican Conference Chair)
Party	Republican	Democratic
Leader since	March 4, 1863
Leader's seat	Rhode Island
Last election	57 seats	9 seats
Seats before	63	11
Seats won	17	7
Seats after	58	14
Seat change	▼4	▲3
Seats up	21	4
- Results of the elections: Democratic gain Democratic hold Republican hold Legislature failed to elect
Majority Party before election
Republican
Elected Majority Party
Republican

The 1870–71 United States Senate elections were held on various dates in various states. As these U.S. Senate elections were prior to the ratification of the Seventeenth Amendment in 1913, senators were chosen by state legislatures. Senators were elected over a wide range of time throughout 1870 and 1871, and a seat may have been filled months late or remained vacant due to legislative deadlock. In these elections, terms were up for the senators in Class 2.

== Events of the election ==
The Republican Party lost five seats, though it still retained an overwhelming majority. In advance of these elections, the last four seceded states were readmitted to the Senate.

Mississippian Hiram Rhodes Revels became the first African American to be elected as a U.S. Senator and become a member of Congress.

In Georgia, Foster Blodgett was elected and presented his credentials as Senator-elect, but the Senate declared him not elected.

In Virginia, Republican John F. Lewis and Democrat John W. Johnston were elected on January 26, 1870, to fill seats that had been vacant since 1864 and 1865.

== Results summary ==
Senate party division, 42nd Congress (1871–1873)

- Majority party: Republican (55)
- Minority party: Democratic (14)
- Other parties: Liberal Republican (1)
- Vacant: (4)
- Total seats: 74

== Change in Senate composition ==
=== By March 30, 1870 ===
After the readmission of Virginia, Texas, and Mississippi, and the special elections in Iowa and Maine.

D_{6}	D_{5}	D_{4}	D_{3}	D_{2}	D_{1}	V_{1}			
D_{7}	D_{8}	D_{9}	D_{10} Gain Readmitted	R_{62} Gain Readmitted	R_{61} Gain Readmitted	R_{60} Gain Special	R_{59} Gain Readmitted	R_{58} Gain Readmitted	R_{57} Gain Readmitted
R_{47}	R_{48}	R_{49}	R_{50}	R_{51}	R_{52}	R_{53}	R_{54}	R_{55}	R_{56} Appointee elected
R_{46}	R_{45}	R_{44}	R_{43}	R_{42}	R_{41}	R_{40}	R_{39}	R_{38}	R_{37}
Majority →									R_{36}
R_{27}	R_{28}	R_{29}	R_{30}	R_{31}	R_{32}	R_{33}	R_{34}	R_{35}	R_{36}
R_{26}	R_{25}	R_{24}	R_{23}	R_{22}	R_{21}	R_{20}	R_{19}	R_{18}	R_{17}
R_{7}	R_{8}	R_{9}	R_{10}	R_{11}	R_{12}	R_{13}	R_{14}	R_{15}	R_{16}
R_{6}	R_{5}	R_{4}	R_{3}	R_{2}	R_{1}	V_{2}			

=== Before the elections ===
Including the February 1871 readmission of Georgia.

D_{7}	D_{6}	D_{5}	D_{4}	D_{3}	D_{2}	D_{1}			
D_{8} Ran	D_{9} Ran	D_{10} Unknown	D_{11} Unknown	R_{63} Retired	R_{62} Retired	R_{61} Retired	R_{60} Retired	R_{59} Retired	R_{58} Unknown
R_{48} Ran	R_{49} Ran	R_{50} Ran	R_{51} Ran	R_{52} Ran	R_{53} Ran	R_{54} Ran	R_{55} Unknown	R_{56} Unknown	R_{57} Unknown
R_{47} Ran	R_{46} Ran	R_{45} Ran	R_{44} Ran	R_{43} Ran	R_{42}	R_{41}	R_{40}	R_{39}	R_{38}
Majority →									R_{37}
R_{28}	R_{29}	R_{30}	R_{31}	R_{32}	R_{33}	R_{34}	R_{35}	R_{36}	R_{37}
R_{27}	R_{26}	R_{25}	R_{24}	R_{23}	R_{22}	R_{21}	R_{20}	R_{19}	R_{18}
R_{8}	R_{9}	R_{10}	R_{11}	R_{12}	R_{13}	R_{14}	R_{15}	R_{16}	R_{17}
R_{7}	R_{6}	R_{5}	R_{4}	R_{3}	R_{2}	R_{1}			

=== Result of the elections ===
D_{7}	D_{6}	D_{5}	D_{4}	D_{3}	D_{2}	D_{1}			
D_{8} Hold	D_{9} Hold	D_{10} Hold	D_{11} Gain	D_{12} Gain	D_{13} Gain	D_{14} Gain	V_{1} D Loss	V_{2} R Loss	R_{58} Hold
R_{48} Re-elected	R_{49} Hold	R_{50} Hold	R_{51} Hold	R_{52} Hold	R_{53} Hold	R_{54} Hold	R_{55} Hold	R_{56} Hold	R_{57} Hold
R_{47} Re-elected	R_{46} Re-elected	R_{45} Re-elected	R_{44} Re-elected	R_{43} Re-elected	R_{42}	R_{41}	R_{40}	R_{39}	R_{38}
Majority →									R_{37}
R_{28}	R_{29}	R_{30}	R_{31}	R_{32}	R_{33}	R_{34}	R_{35}	R_{36}	R_{37}
R_{27}	R_{26}	R_{25}	R_{24}	R_{23}	R_{22}	R_{21}	R_{20}	R_{19}	R_{18}
R_{8}	R_{9}	R_{10}	R_{11}	R_{12}	R_{13}	R_{14}	R_{15}	R_{16}	R_{17}
R_{7}	R_{6}	R_{5}	R_{4}	R_{3}	R_{2}	R_{1}			

=== Beginning of the next Congress ===
D_{7}	D_{6}	D_{5}	D_{4}	D_{3}	D_{2}	D_{1}			
D_{8}	D_{9}	D_{10}	D_{11}	D_{12}	D_{13}	D_{14} Gain	V_{1} D Loss	V_{2}	V_{3}
R_{48}	R_{49}	R_{50}	R_{51}	R_{52}	R_{53}	R_{54}	R_{55}	LR_{1} Change	V_{4} R Loss
R_{47}	R_{46}	R_{45}	R_{44}	R_{43}	R_{42}	R_{41}	R_{40}	R_{39}	R_{38}
Majority →									R_{37}
R_{28}	R_{29}	R_{30}	R_{31}	R_{32}	R_{33}	R_{34}	R_{35}	R_{36}	R_{37}
R_{27}	R_{26}	R_{25}	R_{24}	R_{23}	R_{22}	R_{21}	R_{20}	R_{19}	R_{18}
R_{8}	R_{9}	R_{10}	R_{11}	R_{12}	R_{13}	R_{14}	R_{15}	R_{16}	R_{17}
R_{7}	R_{6}	R_{5}	R_{4}	R_{3}	R_{2}	R_{1}			

Key:

D_{#}	Democratic
LR_{#}	Liberal Republican
R_{#}	Republican
V_{#}	Vacant

== Race summaries ==
=== Special elections during the 41st Congress ===
In these elections, the winners were seated during 1870 or in 1871 before March 4; ordered by election date.

State	Incumbent			Results	Candidates
State	Senator	Party	Electoral history	Results	Candidates
Iowa (Class 2)	James W. Grimes	Republican	1858; 1864	Incumbent resigned December 6, 1869 due to ill health. New senator elected January 18, 1870. Winner did not seek election to the next term.	▌ ✓ James B. Howell (Republican); ▌John Thompson Stoneman (Democratic)
Maine (Class 2)	Lot M. Morrill	Republican	1861 (special); 1863; 1869 (lost); 1869 (appointed)	Interim appointee elected January 19, 1870 to finish the term. Winner was also elected to the next term; see below.	▌ ✓ Lot M. Morrill (Republican); [data missing]
Virginia (Class 1)	Vacant since January 2, 1864, when Joseph Segar (U) was not seated.			State readmitted to the Union. New senator elected January 26, 1870. Republican gain.	▌ ✓ John F. Lewis (Republican); [data missing]
Virginia (Class 2)	Vacant since March 4, 1865, when John Curtiss Underwood (U) was not seated.			State readmitted to the Union. New senator elected January 26, 1870. Democratic gain. Winner was also elected late to the next term; see below.	▌ ✓ John W. Johnston (Democratic); [data missing]
Texas (Class 1)	Vacant since March 23, 1861, when Louis Wigfall (D) withdrew.			State readmitted to the Union. New senator elected February 22, 1870. Republican gain.	▌ ✓ J. W. Flanagan (Republican) 74; ▌ Nelson Plato (Democratic) 32; ▌ S. D. Wood (Democratic) 3; ▌ L. D. Evans (Democratic) 1; ▌ A. B. Norton (Independent) 1
Texas (Class 2)	Vacant since July 11, 1861, when John Hemphill (D) was expelled.			State readmitted to the Union. New senator elected February 22, 1870. Allowed to take office when state readmitted on March 30, 1870. Republican gain. Winner was also elected to the next term; see below.	▌ ✓ Morgan C. Hamilton (Republican) 69; ▌ Albert H. Latimer (Democratic) 35; ▌ J. J. Jarvis (Democratic) 4; ▌ J. W. Glenn (Independent) 1; ▌ Nelson Plato (Democratic) 1; ▌ X. B. Saunders (Democratic) 1
Mississippi (Class 1)	Vacant since January 21, 1861, when Jefferson Davis (D) resigned			State readmitted to the Union. New senator elected January 19, 1870. Republican gain.	▌ ✓ Adelbert Ames (Republican) 94; ▌ Robert Lowry (Democratic) 24; ▌ Horace Greeley 1; ▌ James L. Alcorn 1
Mississippi (Class 2)	Vacant since January 12, 1861, when Albert G. Brown (D) withdrew.			State readmitted to the Union. New senator elected on the fifth ballot on January 20, 1870. Republican gain. James L. Alcorn had already been elected for the next term the previous day; see below.	▌ ✓ Hiram R. Revels (Republican) 81; ▌ Able Alderson (Unknown) 15; Other candidates 23
Missouri (Class 3)	Daniel T. Jewett	Republican	1870 (appointed)	Interim appointee retired. New senator elected January 20, 1871 to finish the term. Democratic gain.	▌ ✓ Francis Preston Blair Jr. (Democratic) 61.5%; ▌John B. Henderson (Republican) 35.5%; ▌John F. Benjamin (Republican) 3.0%
Minnesota (Class 2)	William Windom	Republican	1865	Interim appointee was not elected to finish the term. New senator elected January 22, 1871 to finish the term. Republican hold. Winner was not elected to the next term; see below. Instead, interim appointee was elected to the next term; see below.	▌ ✓ Ozora P. Stearns (Republican) 44 (73.3%); ▌Eugene M. Wilson (Democratic) 13 (21.7%); ▌Amos Coggswell (Democratic) 2 (3.3%); ▌Ignatius L. Donnelly (Democratic) 1 (1.7%)
Georgia (Class 3)	Vacant since January 28, 1861, when Alfred Iverson Sr. (D) withdrew.			State readmitted to the Union. New senator elected in 1867, but not seated until readmission on February 1, 1871. Republican gain.	▌ ✓ Joshua Hill (Republican); [data missing]
Georgia (Class 2)	Vacant since February 4, 1861, when Robert Toombs (D) withdrew.			State readmitted to the Union. New senator elected February 24, 1871. Democratic gain. Unknown if winner ran for the next term or retired; see below.	▌ ✓ Homer V. M. Miller (Democratic); [data missing]

=== Races leading to the 42nd Congress ===
In these regular elections, the winners were elected for the term beginning March 4, 1871; ordered by state.

All of the elections involved the Class 2 seats.

State	Incumbent			Results	Candidates
State	Senator	Party	Electoral history	Results	Candidates
Alabama	Willard Warner	Republican	1868 (readmission)	Incumbent lost re-election. New senator elected in 1870. Democratic gain.	▌ ✓ George Goldthwaite (Democratic); ▌Willard Warner (Republican); [data missing]
Arkansas	Alexander McDonald	Republican	1868 (readmission)	Incumbent lost re-election. New senator elected in 1870. Republican hold.	▌ ✓ Powell Clayton (Republican); ▌Alexander McDonald (Republican); [data missing]
Delaware	Willard Saulsbury Sr.	Democratic	1858; 1864	Incumbent lost re-election to his older brother. New senator elected in 1870. Democratic hold.	▌ ✓ Eli Saulsbury (Democratic); ▌Willard Saulsbury Sr. (Democratic); [data missing]
Georgia	Homer V. M. Miller	Democratic	1871 (readmission)	Incumbent retired or lost re-election. New senator elected in 1876 or 1877. Democratic loss. Senate later refused to seat Senator-elect Foster Blodgett.	▌ ✓ Foster Blodgett (Republican); [data missing]
Illinois	Richard Yates	Republican	1864–65	Incumbent retired. New senator elected in 1870 or 1871. Republican hold.	▌ ✓ John A. Logan (Republican); [data missing]
Iowa	James B. Howell	Republican	1870 (special)	Incumbent retired. New senator elected January 18, 1870. Republican hold.	▌ ✓ George G. Wright (Republican); ▌Thomas W. Claggett (Democratic)
Kansas	Edmund G. Ross	Republican	1866 (appointed); 1867 (special)	Incumbent lost re-election. New senator elected in 1871. Republican hold.	▌ ✓ Alexander Caldwell (Republican); ▌Edmund G. Ross (Republican); [data missing]
Kentucky	Thomas C. McCreery	Democratic	1868 (special)	Incumbent lost re-election. New senator elected December 16, 1869. Democratic hold.	▌ ✓ John W. Stevenson (Democratic) 117; ▌ H. F. Finley (Republican) 10; ▌ Richard M. Spalding (Democratic) 5; ▌ John C. Breckinridge (Democratic) 1
Louisiana	John S. Harris	Republican	1868 (readmission)	Unknown if incumbent ran for re-election. New senator elected in 1870 or 1871. Republican hold.	▌ ✓ Joseph R. West (Republican); [data missing]
Maine	Lot M. Morrill	Republican	1861 (special); 1863; 1869 (lost); 1869 (appointed); 1870 (special)	Incumbent re-elected in 1870 or 1871.	▌ ✓ Lot M. Morrill (Republican); [data missing]
Massachusetts	Henry Wilson	Republican	1855 (special); 1859; 1865	Incumbent re-elected in 1871.	▌ ✓ Henry Wilson (Republican); [data missing]
Michigan	Jacob M. Howard	Republican	1862 (special); 1865	Incumbent retired or lost re-election. New senator elected January 18, 1871. Republican hold.	▌ ✓ Thomas W. Ferry (Republican); [data missing]
Minnesota	Ozora P. Stearns	Republican	1871 (special)	Incumbent retired. New senator elected in January 1871. Republican hold.	▌ ✓ William Windom (Republican) 43 (71.7%); ▌Richard A. Jones (Democratic) 14 (23.3%); ▌Morton S. Wilkinson (Republican) 1 (1.7%); ▌Cornelius F. Buck (Democratic) 1 (1.7%); ▌Thomas Wilson (Republican) 1 (1.7%)
Mississippi	Hiram Rhodes Revels	Republican	1870 (readmission)	New senator elected January 19, 1870, prior to incumbent's election on January 20 (see above). Republican hold.	▌ ✓ James L. Alcorn (Republican) 120; ▌ William L. Sharkey 1
Nebraska	John M. Thayer	Republican	1867	Incumbent lost re-election. New senator elected in 1870. Republican hold.	▌ ✓ Phineas Hitchcock (Republican); ▌John M. Thayer (Republican); [data missing]
New Hampshire	Aaron H. Cragin	Republican	1864	Incumbent re-elected in 1870.	▌ ✓ Aaron H. Cragin (Republican); [data missing]
New Jersey	Alexander G. Cattell	Republican	1866 (special)	Incumbent retired. New senator elected in 1870 or 1871. Republican hold.	▌ ✓ Frederick T. Frelinghuysen (Republican); [data missing]
North Carolina	Joseph Abbott	Republican	1868 (readmission)	Incumbent lost renomination. Legislature failed to elect. Republican loss. Seat remained vacant until January 30, 1872.	[data missing]
Oregon	George H. Williams	Republican	1864	Incumbent lost re-election. New senator elected in 1870. Democratic gain.	▌ ✓ James K. Kelly (Democratic); ▌George H. Williams (Republican); [data missing]
Rhode Island	Henry B. Anthony	Republican	1858; 1864	Incumbent re-elected in 1870.	▌ ✓ Henry B. Anthony (Republican); [data missing]
South Carolina	Thomas J. Robertson	Republican	1868 (readmission)	Incumbent re-elected in 1870.	▌ ✓ Thomas J. Robertson (Republican); [data missing]
Tennessee	Joseph S. Fowler	Republican	1866 (readmission)	Incumbent retired. New senator elected in 1870 or 1871. Democratic gain.	▌ ✓ Henry Cooper (Democratic); [data missing]
Texas	Morgan C. Hamilton	Republican	1870 (readmission)	State readmitted to the Union. New senator elected February 22, 1870. Republican hold. Winner was also elected to the unexpired term; see above.	▌ ✓ Morgan C. Hamilton (Republican) 71; ▌ Horace Broughton (Democratic) 39; ▌ A. B. Norton (Independent) 1
Virginia	John W. Johnston	Democratic	1870 (readmission)	Incumbent retired or lost re-election. Legislature failed to elect. Democratic loss. Seat remained vacant until March 15, 1871.	[data missing]
West Virginia	Waitman T. Willey	Republican	1863; 1865	Incumbent retired or lost re-election. New senator elected in 1871. Democratic gain.	▌ ✓ Henry G. Davis (Democratic); [data missing]

=== Elections during the 42nd Congress ===
In this election, the winner was elected in 1871 after March 4.

State	Incumbent			Results	Candidates
State	Senator	Party	Electoral history	Results	Candidates
Virginia (Class 2)	Vacant			Legislature had failed to elect. Previous incumbent re-elected March 15, 1871. Democratic gain.	▌ ✓ John W. Johnston (Democratic) [data missing]
Georgia (Class 2)	Vacant			Foster Blodgett (R) had presented credentials as Senator-elect, but the Senate declared him not elected. New senator elected November 14, 1871. Democratic gain.	▌ ✓ Thomas M. Norwood (Democratic) [data missing]

== West Virginia ==
1871 United States Senate election in West Virginia
- January 31, 1871

Needed to win: Majority of votes cast in each House of the Legislature 54 votes cast in the House; 28 votes needed 21 votes cast in the Senate; 11 votes needed
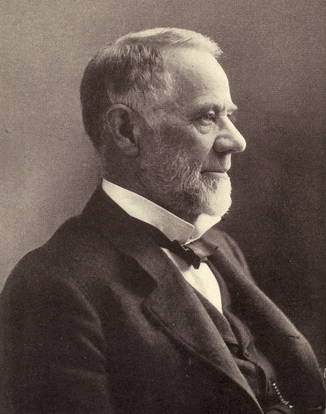

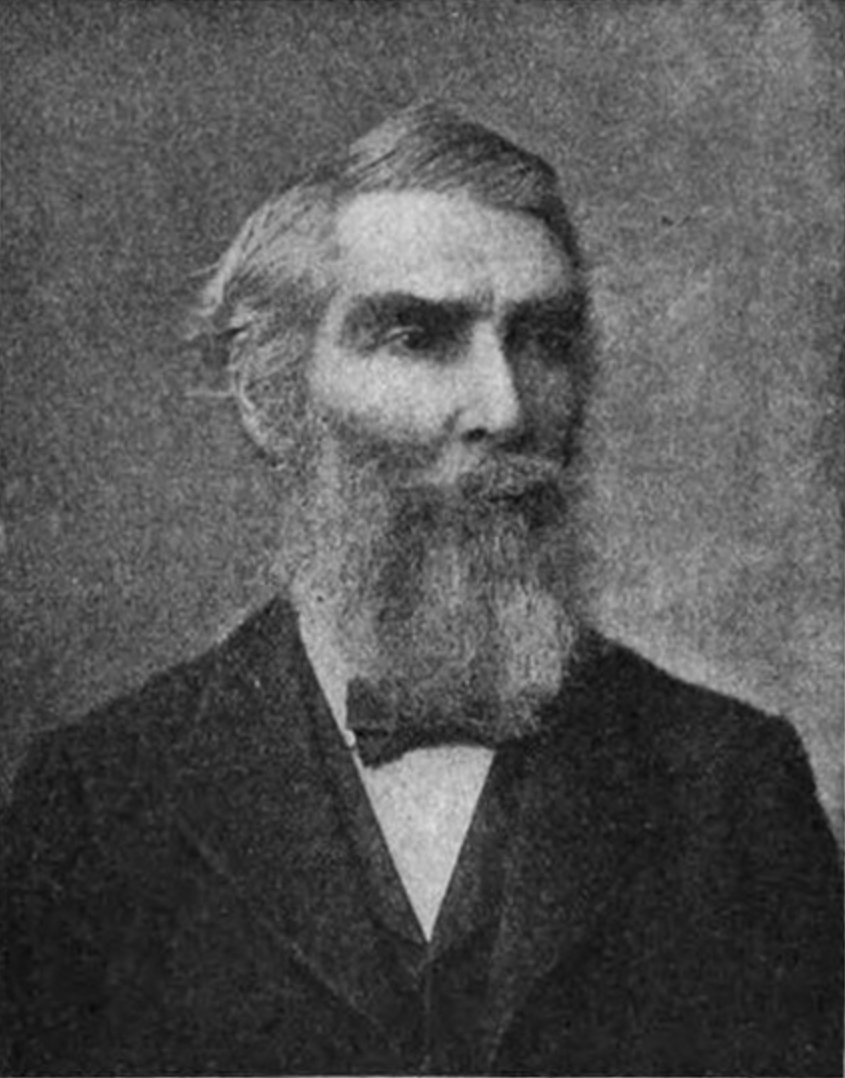
Candidate	Henry G. Davis	James H. Brown
Party	Democratic	Republican
House vote	39 votes 72.2%	15 votes 27.8%
Senate vote	14 votes 66.7%	7 votes 33.3%
U.S. senator before election
Waitman T. Willey
Republican
Elected U.S. Senator
Henry G. Davis
Democratic

Henry G. Davis, a Democratic state legislator, was elected to replace outgoing Republican incumbent Waitman T. Willey. Davis won the Democratic caucus vote over former legislators Daniel Lamb and Benjamin H. Smith. Davis' victory was attributed to widespread support throughout the state, as well as among party leaders. Nearly all of Lamb's votes, meanwhile, were localized to the Northern Panhandle.

Democratic nomination
Candidate	First Ballot	
Candidate	Votes	%
Henry G. Davis	27	52.9
Daniel Lamb	12	23.5
Benjamin H. Smith	12	23.5
Total	51	100
Needed to win	26	>50

Floor vote
Party	Candidate	House		Senate	
Party	Candidate	Votes	%	Votes	%
Democratic	Henry G. Davis	39	72.2	14	66.7
Republican	James H. Brown	15	27.8	7	33.3
Total		54	100	21	100
Needed to win		28	>50	11	>50

== See also ==
- 1870 United States elections
  - 1870–71 United States House of Representatives elections
- 41st United States Congress
- 42nd United States Congress
