= 1872–73 United States Senate elections =

- Dates vary by state (And other dates for special elections)
- Class 3

24 of the 74 seats in the United States Senate (with special elections) 38 seats needed for a majority
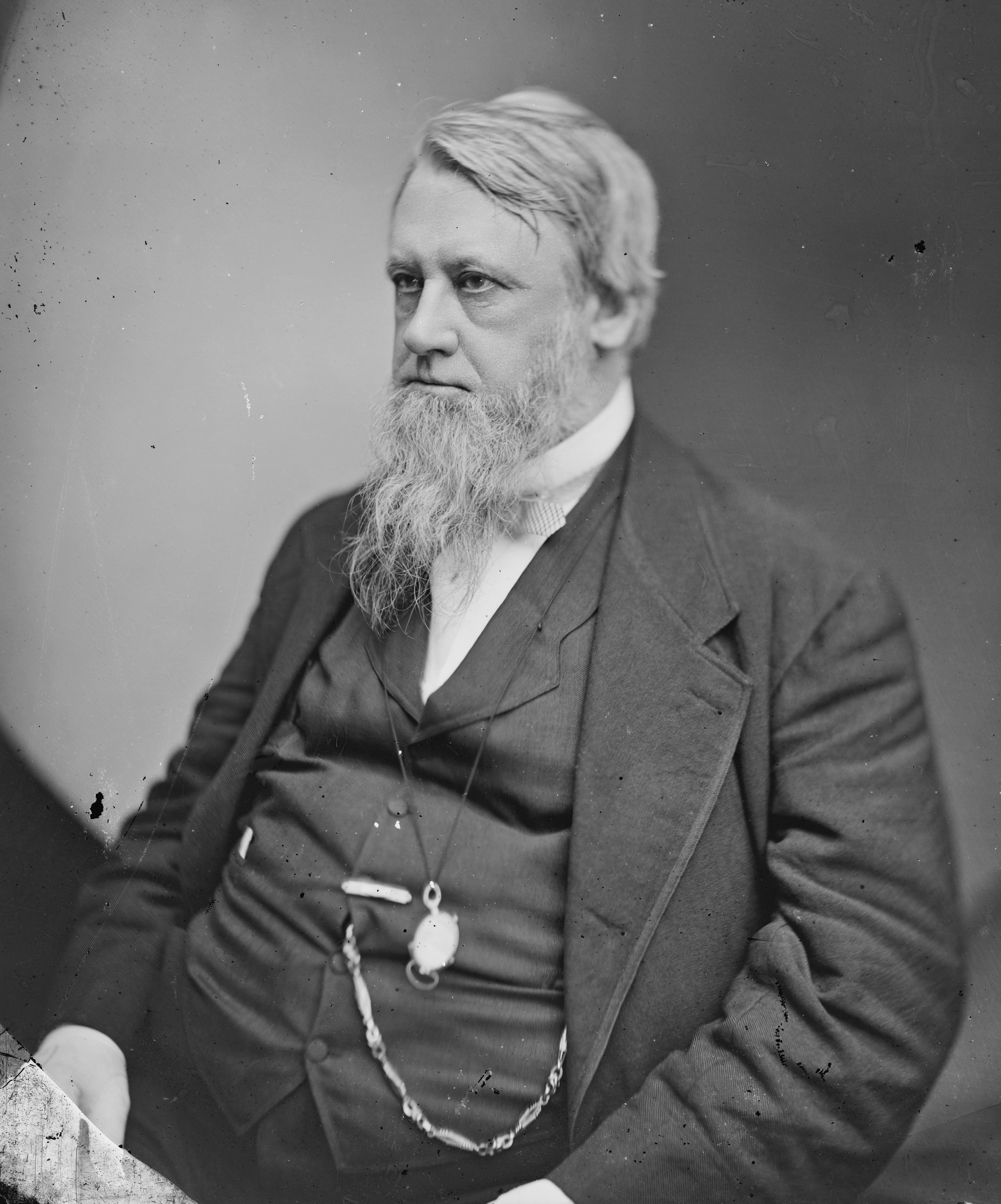

	Majority party	Minority party
Leader	Henry B. Anthony (Note: as Republican Conference Chair)
Party	Republican	Democratic
Leader since	March 4, 1863
Leader's seat	Rhode Island
Last election	58 seats	9 seats
Seats before	56	17
Seats won	18	5
Seats after	54	19
Seat change	▼2	▲2
Seats up	20	3
	Third party
Party	Liberal Republican
Last election	0 seats
Seats before	1
Seats won	0
Seats after	0
Seat change	▼1
Seats up	1
- Results of the elections: Democratic gain Democratic hold Republican gain Republican hold Liberal Republican gain Legislature failed to elect
Majority Party before election
Republican
Elected Majority Party
Republican

The 1872–73 United States Senate elections were held on various dates in various states, coinciding with President Ulysses S. Grant's re-election. As these U.S. Senate elections were prior to the ratification of the Seventeenth Amendment in 1913, senators were chosen by state legislatures. Senators were elected over a wide range of time throughout 1872 and 1873, and a seat may have been filled months late or remained vacant due to legislative deadlock. In these elections, terms were up for the senators in Class 3.

The Republican Party, while still retaining a commanding majority, lost two seats. By the beginning of the Congress, however, they would lose three more: two as defections to the Liberal Republican Party, and one a resignation of Henry Wilson to become U.S. vice president. This remains the last election in which Republicans held a 2/3 majority in the Senate.

== Results summary ==
Senate party division, 43rd Congress (1873–1875)

- Majority party: Republican (50–51)
- Minority party: Democratic (19–20)
- Other parties: Liberal Republican (3–2)
- Vacant: (2–1)
- Total seats: 74

== Change in composition ==
=== Before the elections ===
After the January 30, 1872 special election in North Carolina.

D_{7}	D_{6}	D_{5}	D_{4}	D_{3}	D_{2}	D_{1}			
D_{8}	D_{9}	D_{10}	D_{11}	D_{12}	D_{13}	D_{14}	D_{15} Ran	D_{16} Unknown	D_{17} Unknown
R_{48} Unknown	R_{49} Unknown	R_{50} Unknown	R_{51} Retired	R_{52} Retired	R_{53} Retired	R_{54} Retired	R_{55} Retired	R_{56} Resigned	LR_{1} Retired
R_{47} Ran	R_{46} Ran	R_{45} Ran	R_{44} Ran	R_{43} Ran	R_{42} Ran	R_{41} Ran	R_{40} Ran	R_{39} Ran	R_{38} Ran
Majority →									R_{38} Ran
R_{28}	R_{29}	R_{30}	R_{31}	R_{32}	R_{33}	R_{34}	R_{35}	R_{36}	R_{37} Ran
R_{27}	R_{26}	R_{25}	R_{24}	R_{23}	R_{22}	R_{21}	R_{20}	R_{19}	R_{18}
R_{8}	R_{9}	R_{10}	R_{11}	R_{12}	R_{13}	R_{14}	R_{15}	R_{16}	R_{17}
R_{7}	R_{6}	R_{5}	R_{4}	R_{3}	R_{2}	R_{1}			

=== Result of the elections ===
D_{7}	D_{6}	D_{5}	D_{4}	D_{3}	D_{2}	D_{1}			
D_{8}	D_{9}	D_{10}	D_{11}	D_{12}	D_{13}	D_{14}	D_{15} Hold	D_{16} Hold	D_{17} Hold
R_{48} Hold	R_{49} Hold	R_{50} Hold	R_{51} Hold	R_{52} Hold	R_{53} Gain	LR_{1} Re-elected, new party	V_{1} R Loss	D_{19} Gain	D_{18} Gain
R_{47} Hold	R_{46} Hold	R_{45} Hold	R_{44} Hold	R_{43} Re-elected	R_{42} Re-elected	R_{41} Re-elected	R_{40} Re-elected	R_{39} Re-elected	R_{38} Re-elected
Majority →									R_{37} Re-elected
R_{28}	R_{29}	R_{30}	R_{31}	R_{32}	R_{33}	R_{34}	R_{35}	R_{36}	R_{37} Re-elected
R_{27}	R_{26}	R_{25}	R_{24}	R_{23}	R_{22}	R_{21}	R_{20}	R_{19}	R_{18}
R_{8}	R_{9}	R_{10}	R_{11}	R_{12}	R_{13}	R_{14}	R_{15}	R_{16}	R_{17}
R_{7}	R_{6}	R_{5}	R_{4}	R_{3}	R_{2}	R_{1}			

=== Beginning of the next Congress ===
D_{7}	D_{6}	D_{5}	D_{4}	D_{3}	D_{2}	D_{1}			
D_{8}	D_{9}	D_{10}	D_{11}	D_{12}	D_{13}	D_{14}	D_{15}	D_{16}	D_{17}
R_{48}	R_{49}	R_{50}	LR_{1}	LR_{2} Changed	LR_{3} Changed	V_{1}	V_{2} Resigned	D_{19}	D_{18}
R_{47}	R_{46}	R_{45}	R_{44}	R_{43}	R_{42}	R_{41}	R_{40}	R_{39}	R_{38}
Majority →									R_{37}
R_{28}	R_{29}	R_{30}	R_{31}	R_{32}	R_{33}	R_{34}	R_{35}	R_{36}	R_{37}
R_{27}	R_{26}	R_{25}	R_{24}	R_{23}	R_{22}	R_{21}	R_{20}	R_{19}	R_{18}
R_{8}	R_{9}	R_{10}	R_{11}	R_{12}	R_{13}	R_{14}	R_{15}	R_{16}	R_{17}
R_{7}	R_{6}	R_{5}	R_{4}	R_{3}	R_{2}	R_{1}			

Key:

D_{#}	Democratic
LR_{#}	Liberal Republican
R_{#}	Republican
V_{#}	Vacant

== Race summaries ==
=== Special elections during the 42nd Congress ===
In these elections, the winners were seated during 1872 or in 1873 before March 4; ordered by election date.

State	Incumbent			Results	Candidates
State	Senator	Party	Electoral history	Results	Candidates
North Carolina (Class 2)	Vacant			Legislature had failed to elect. New senator elected January 30, 1872. Democratic gain.	▌ ✓ Matt W. Ransom (Democratic); [data missing]
Kentucky (Class 3)	Willis B. Machen	Democratic	1872 (appointed)	Interim appointee elected January 21, 1873. Winner was not elected to the next term; see below.	▌ ✓ Willis B. Machen (Democratic) 104; ▌Richard Tarvin Baker (Republican) 18
Louisiana (Class 3)	William P. Kellogg	Republican	1868	Incumbent resigned November 1, 1872 to become governor of Louisiana. Legislature failed to elect. The seat remained vacant until January 12, 1876, due to a Senate dispute; see below. Republican loss.	▌P. B. S. Pinchback (Republican); ▌John Ray (Unknown); [data missing]

=== Races leading to the 43rd Congress ===
In these regular elections, the winners were elected for the term beginning March 4, 1873; ordered by state.

All of the elections involved the Class 3 seats.

State	Incumbent			Results	Candidates
State	Senator	Party	Electoral history	Results	Candidates
Alabama	George E. Spencer	Republican	1868 (readmission)	Incumbent re-elected in 1872.	▌ ✓ George E. Spencer (Republican); [data missing]
Arkansas	Benjamin F. Rice	Republican	1868 (readmission)	Incumbent retired. New senator elected in 1872 or 1873. Republican hold.	▌ ✓ Stephen W. Dorsey (Republican); [data missing]
California	Cornelius Cole	Republican	1866–67	Unknown if incumbent retired or lost re-election. New senator elected in 1872 or 1873. Republican hold.	▌ ✓ Aaron A. Sargent (Republican); [data missing]
Connecticut	Orris S. Ferry	Republican	1866	Incumbent re-elected May 15, 1872 as a Liberal Republican. Liberal Republican gain.	▌ ✓ Orris S. Ferry (Liberal Republican) 51.55%; ▌Joseph R. Hawley (Republican) 48.45%
Florida	Thomas W. Osborn	Republican	1868 (readmission)	Incumbent retired. New senator elected in 1872 or 1873. Republican hold.	▌ ✓ Simon B. Conover (Republican); [data missing]
Georgia	Joshua Hill	Republican	1867 (not seated); 1871 (admitted)	Incumbent retired. New senator elected in 1873. Democratic gain.	▌ ✓ John Brown Gordon (Democratic); [data missing]
Illinois	Lyman Trumbull	Liberal; Republican	1855; 1861; 1867	Incumbent lost re-election. New senator elected January 20, 1873. Republican gain.	▌ ✓ Richard J. Oglesby (Republican) 54.53%; ▌Lyman Trumbull (Liberal Republican) 42.47%
Indiana	Oliver P. Morton	Republican	1867	Incumbent re-elected in 1873.	▌ ✓ Oliver P. Morton (Republican); [data missing]
Iowa	James Harlan	Republican	1855; 1857 (election voided); 1857 (special); 1860; 1865 (resigned); 1866	Incumbent lost renomination. New senator elected January 17, 1872. Republican hold.	▌ ✓ William B. Allison (Republican); ▌Joseph C. Knapp (Democratic)
Kansas	Samuel C. Pomeroy	Republican	1861; 1867	Incumbent lost re-election. New senator elected in 1873. Republican hold.	▌ ✓ John Ingalls (Republican); [data missing]
Kentucky	Willis B. Machen	Democratic	1872 (appointed)	Interim appointee retired or lost re-election. New senator elected December 19, 1871. Democratic hold. Winner was not elected to finish the current term, see above.	▌ ✓ Thomas C. McCreery (Democratic) 112; ▌John Marshall Harlan (Republican) 20
Louisiana	William P. Kellogg	Republican	1868	Incumbent resigned November 1, 1872 to become governor of Louisiana. Legislature failed to elect and the seat remained vacant until January 12, 1876 due to a Senate dispute.	▌P. B. S. Pinchback (Republican); ▌William L. McMillen (Republican); [data missing]
Maryland	George Vickers	Democratic	1868 (special)	Incumbent retired or lost re-election. New senator elected in 1872 or 1873. Democratic hold.	▌ ✓ George R. Dennis (Democratic); [data missing]
Missouri	Francis Blair	Democratic	1871 (special)	Incumbent lost re-election. New senator elected in 1872 or 1873. Democratic hold.	▌ ✓ Lewis V. Bogy (Democratic); [data missing]
Nevada	James W. Nye	Republican	1865; 1867	Incumbent retired. New senator elected in 1873. Republican hold.	▌ ✓ John P. Jones (Republican); [data missing]
New Hampshire	James W. Patterson	Republican	1866–67	Incumbent lost renomination. New senator elected in 1872. Republican hold.	▌ ✓ Bainbridge Wadleigh (Republican); [data missing]
New York	Roscoe Conkling	Republican	1867	Incumbent re-elected January 21, 1873.	▌ ✓ Roscoe Conkling (Republican); ▌Charles A. Wheaton (Democratic); ▌William M. Evarts (Republican); ▌Henry R. Selden (Liberal Republican)
North Carolina	John Pool	Republican	1868 (readmission)	Incumbent retired. New senator elected in 1872. Democratic gain.	▌ ✓ Augustus Merrimon (Democratic); [data missing]
Ohio	John Sherman	Republican	1861 (special); 1866	Incumbent re-elected in 1872.	▌ ✓ John Sherman (Republican); [data missing]
Oregon	Henry W. Corbett	Republican	1866–67	Incumbent retired. New senator elected in 1872. Republican hold.	▌ ✓ John H. Mitchell (Republican); [data missing]
Pennsylvania	Simon Cameron	Republican	1867	Incumbent re-elected January 21, 1873.	▌ ✓ Simon Cameron (Republican) 57.14%; ▌William A. Wallace (Democratic) 37.59%; ▌Thomas Marshall (Liberal Republican) 0.75%; ▌Hendrick B. Wright (Democratic) 0.75%
South Carolina	Frederick A. Sawyer	Republican	1868	Incumbent retired or lost re-election. New senator elected in 1872 or 1873. Republican hold.	▌ ✓ John J. Patterson (Republican); [data missing]
Vermont	Justin S. Morrill	Republican	1866	Incumbent re-elected in 1872.	▌ ✓ Justin S. Morrill (Republican); [data missing]
Wisconsin	Timothy O. Howe	Republican	1861; 1867	Incumbent re-elected January 22, 1873.	▌ ✓ Timothy O. Howe (Republican) 64.84%; ▌ Henry L. Palmer (Democratic) 34.38%; ▌ Charles A. Eldredge (Democratic) 0.78%

=== Elections during the 43rd Congress ===
In this election, the winner was elected in 1873 after March 4.

State	Incumbent			Results	Candidates
State	Senator	Party	Electoral history	Results	Candidates
Massachusetts (Class 2)	Henry Wilson	Republican	1855 (special); 1859; 1865; 1871	Incumbent resigned to become U.S. vice president. New senator elected March 12, 1873. Republican hold.	▌ ✓ George S. Boutwell (Republican) 152; ▌Henry L. Dawes (Republican) 115; ▌George B. Loring (Republican) 2; ▌John K. Tarbox (Democratic) 2; ▌William Whiting (Democratic) 2; ▌C. G. Greene (Unknown) 2 votes
California (Class 1)	Eugene Casserly	Democratic	1868	Incumbent resigned. New senator elected December 23, 1873. Democratic hold.	▌ ✓ John S. Hager (Democratic); ▌[FNU] Cole (Note: Possibly Cornelius Cole) (Republican); ▌[FNU] Goodwin (Unknown); ▌[FNU] Swift (Unknown); ▌[FNU] Lewis (Unknown); ▌[FNU] Edgerton (Unknown)

=== Early election ===
State	Incumbent			Results	Candidates
State	Senator	Party	Electoral history	Results	Candidates
California (Class 1)	Eugene Casserly	Democratic	1868	Incumbent resigned November 29, 1873. New senator elected early December 20, 1873. Anti-Monopoly gain.	▌ ✓ Newton Booth (Anti-Monopoly) 60; [data missing]

== Maryland ==
1872 United States Senate election in Maryland
- January 18, 1872

80 members of the Maryland General Assembly
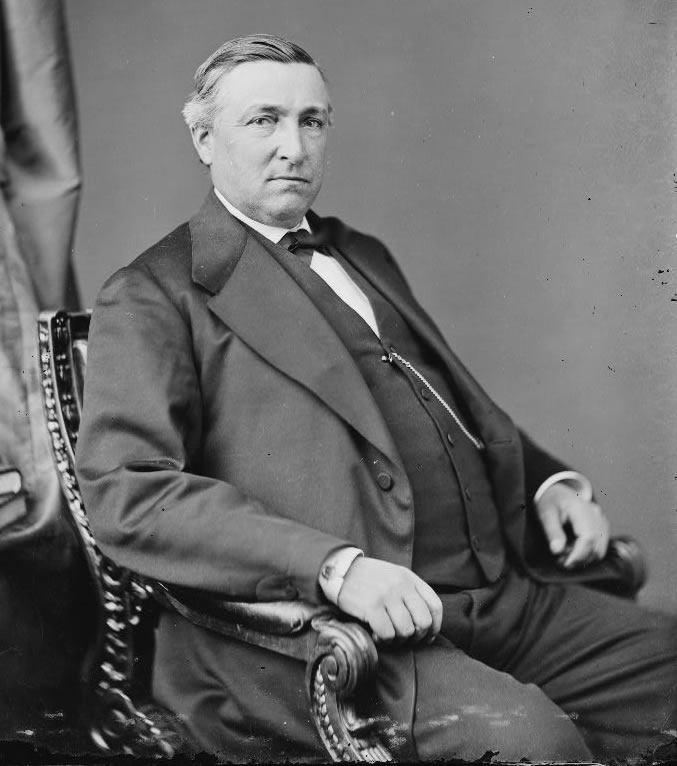

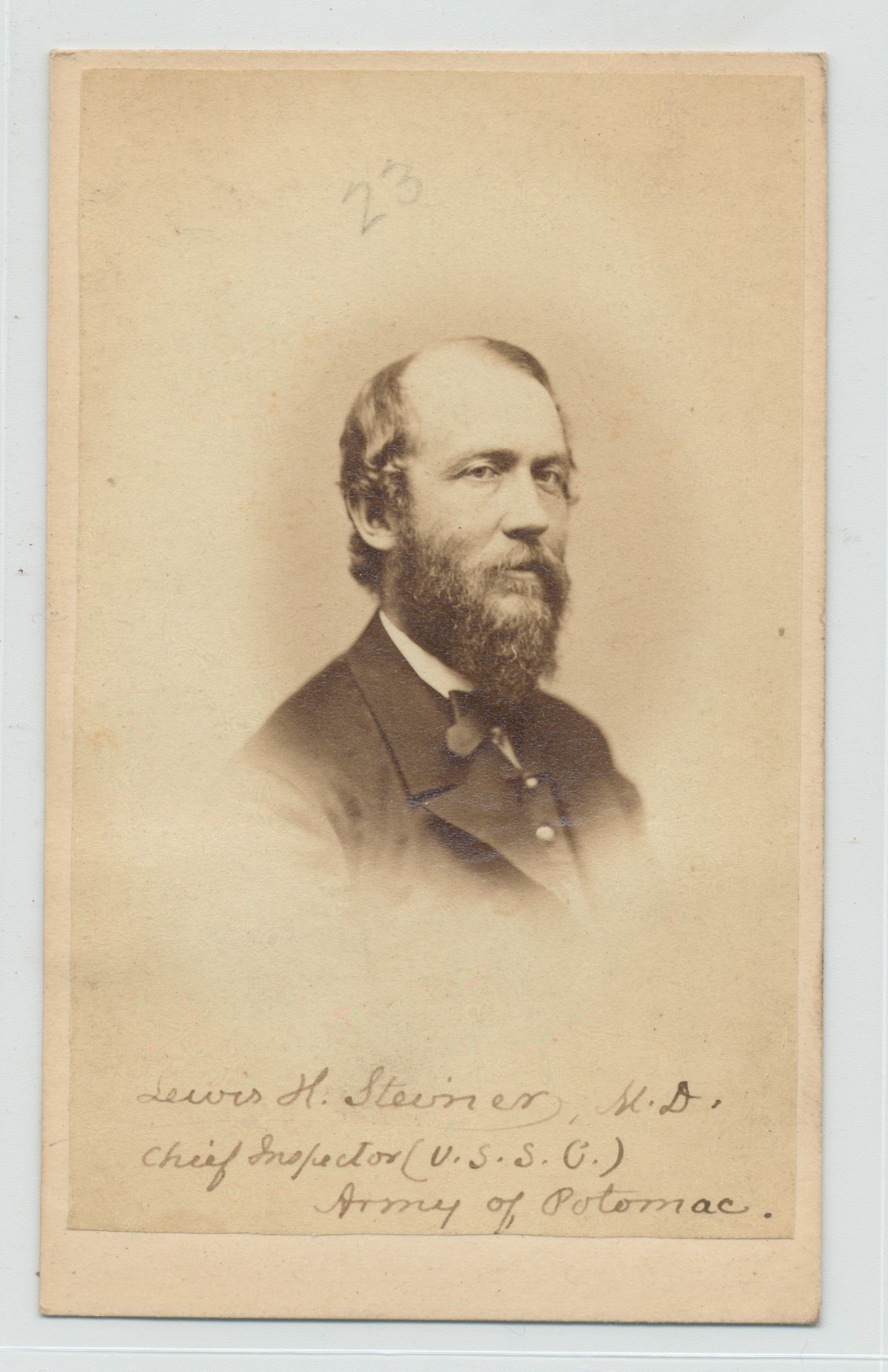
Candidate	George R. Dennis	Lewis Henry Steiner
Party	Democratic	Republican
Legislative vote	81	11
Percentage	87.10%	11.83%

George R. Dennis was elected by a margin of 75.27%, or 70 votes, for the Class 3 seat.

== New York ==
The New York election was held on January 21, 1873. (Note: Although the votes were cast on January 21, both Houses met in a joint session on January 22 to compare nominations, and declare the result.) Republican Roscoe Conkling had been elected in January 1867 to this seat, and his term would expire on March 3, 1873.

At the state election in November 1871, 21 Republicans and 11 Democrats were elected for a two-year term (1872–1873) in the State Senate. In 1872, a faction of the Republican Party opposed the re-election of President Ulysses S. Grant and the Radical Republicans who supported him, and under the name Liberal Republican Party nominated a joint ticket with the Democratic Party. At the State election in November 1872, 91 Republicans, 35 Democrats and two Independents were elected for the session of 1873 to the Assembly. The 96th New York State Legislature met from January 7 to May 30, 1873, at Albany, New York.

The caucus of Republican State legislators met on January 8, State Senator William B. Woodin, of Auburn (25th D.), presided. 18 state senators and 88 assemblymen were present. They re-nominated Conkling unanimously. The caucus of the Democratic State legislators nominated Ex-First Judge of Dutchess County Charles Wheaton.

Roscoe Conkling was the choice of both the Assembly and the State Senate, and was declared elected.

House	Republican		Democratic		Republican		Liberal Republican	
State Senate (32 members)	Roscoe Conkling	20	Charles A. Wheaton (Note: Charles A. Wheaton (1834-1886), lawyer, of Poughkeepsie, First Judge of the Dutchess County Court 1863-67)	5	William M. Evarts	1	Henry R. Selden	1
State Assembly (128 members)	Roscoe Conkling	92	Charles A. Wheaton	26				

Note: The vote for Ex-U.S. Attorney General William M. Evarts was cast by Norman M. Allen (32nd district), the vote for Ex-Judge of the New York Court of Appeals Henry R. Selden by Gabriel T. Harrower (27th district). Allen, Harrower and Abiah W. Palmer (11th district) were the three Liberal Republicans in the State Senate.

== Pennsylvania ==
The Pennsylvania General Assembly, consisting of the Pennsylvania House of Representatives and the Pennsylvania State Senate, voted on January 21, 1873. Incumbent Republican Simon Cameron, who was elected in 1867, won re-election.

State legislature results
Party	Candidate	Votes	%
Republican	Simon Cameron (incumbent)	76	57.14
Democratic	William A. Wallace	50	37.59
Liberal Republican	Thomas Marshall	1	0.75
Democratic	Hendrick Wright	1	0.75
N/A	Not voting	5	3.76
Totals		133	100.00%

== Wisconsin ==
The 26th Wisconsin Legislature met in joint session on January 22, 1873, to elect a U.S. senator. The voting was almost entirely along party lines, with five Democrats absent. Of the 128 in attendance, Timothy O. Howe received the votes of all but one of the Republican legislators, winning his third term as U.S. senator.

1st vote of the 26th Wisconsin Legislature, January 22, 1873
Party	Candidate	Votes	%
Republican	Timothy O. Howe (incumbent)	83	64.84%
Democratic	Henry L. Palmer	44	34.38%
Democratic	Charles A. Eldredge	1	0.78%
	Absent	5	
Majority		65	50.78%
Total votes		128	96.24%
Republican hold			

== See also ==
- 1872 United States elections
  - 1872–73 United States House of Representatives elections
  - 1872 United States presidential election
- 42nd United States Congress
- 43rd United States Congress

== Sources ==
- Party Division in the Senate, 1789-Present, via Senate.gov
- Byrd, Robert C. (October 1, 1993). Wolff, Wendy (ed.). The Senate, 1789-1989: Historical Statistics, 1789-1992. United States Senate Historical Office (volume 4 Bicentennial ed.). Washington, DC: U.S. Government Printing Office. ISBN 9780160632563.
- Clark, Dan Elbert (1913). "History of Senatorial Elections in Iowa". Iowa City, Iowa.
- Taft, George S.; Furber, George P.; Buck, George M.; Webb, Charles A.; Pierce, Herbert R. (1913). "Compilation of Senate Election Cases from 1789 to 1913". U.S. Senate Committee on Privileges and Elections. Washington, DC: U.S. Government Printing Office.
- Members of the 43rd United States Congress
- ALBANY.; Unanimous Nomination of Roscoe Conkling for U.S. Senator in NYT on January 9, 1873
- ALBANY.; Nomination of Roscoe Conkling as United States Senator in NYT on January 22, 1873
- The Life and Letters of Roscoe Conkling: Orator, Statesman and Advocate by Alfred R. Conkling (page 449) [gives wrong date for governor's inauguration "January 6", the inauguration happens invariably on January 1; and adds non-existent middle initial "G."]
- Pennsylvania Election Statistics: 1682-2006 from the Wilkes University Election Statistics Project
