= 2006 United States Senate election in Massachusetts =

- November 7, 2006
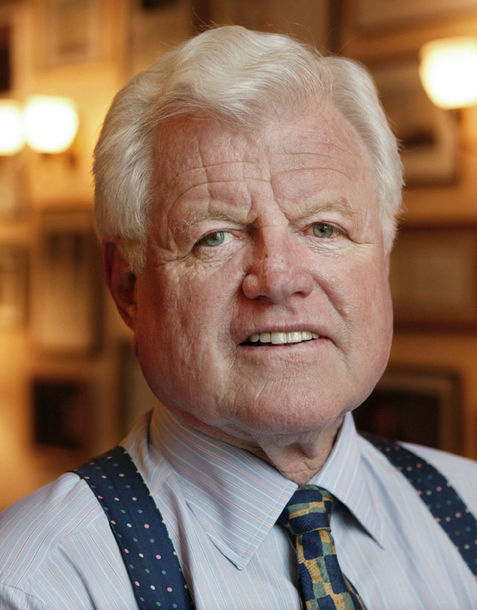

Nominee	Ted Kennedy	Kenneth Chase
Party	Democratic	Republican
Popular vote	1,500,738	661,532
Percentage	69.30%	30.55%
- Kennedy: 50–60% 60–70% 70–80% 80–90% >90% Chase: 50–60% 80–90%
U.S. senator before election
Ted Kennedy
Democratic
Elected U.S. Senator
Ted Kennedy
Democratic

The 2006 United States Senate election in Massachusetts was held November 7, 2006. Incumbent Democrat Ted Kennedy won re-election to his ninth (his eighth full) term. This would be Kennedy's last election to the Senate; he died three years later of brain cancer, with which he was diagnosed in 2008. Senator Kennedy was the fourth longest-serving Senator in U.S. history, having served for nearly 47 years.

== Republican primary ==
=== Candidates ===
- Kenneth Chase, language school owner and activist
- Kevin Scott, businessman and former Wakefield Selectman

=== Campaign ===
At the Massachusetts Republican Party Convention Kenneth Chase received the official endorsement with a majority of delegates, though both candidates qualified for the September primary. Former White House Chief-of-Staff Andrew Card also received 3 votes.

=== Results ===
Republican primary results
Party	Candidate	Votes	%
Republican	Kenneth Chase	35,497	50.94%
Republican	Kevin Scott	34,179	49.05%
Total votes		69,676	100.00

== General election ==
=== Candidates ===
- Ted Kennedy (D), incumbent U.S. Senator since 1962
- Kenneth Chase (R), language school owner and Republican activist

=== Predictions ===
Source	Ranking	As of
The Cook Political Report	Solid D	November 6, 2006
Sabato's Crystal Ball	Safe D	November 6, 2006
Rothenberg Political Report	Safe D	November 6, 2006
Real Clear Politics	Safe D	November 6, 2006

=== Polling ===
Source	Date	MoE	Ted Kennedy (D)	Kenneth Chase (R)	Undecided
Suffolk University	October 20–23, 2006	±4.9%	60%	26%	14%
Boston Globe	October 22–25, 2006	±4.1%	66%	25%	6%

=== Results ===
Kennedy won every county in the state, winning at least 60% in each county. Kennedy served his ninth, and final, term until his death on August 25, 2009 (here, the completion of John F. Kennedy's unexpired term is considered to be Ted Kennedy's first term).

General election
Party	Candidate	Votes	%	±%
Democratic	Ted Kennedy (incumbent)	1,500,738	69.30	−3.39
Republican	Kenneth Chase	661,532	30.55	+17.7
	All others	3,220	0.05%	
Majority		839,206	38.75	
Turnout		2,165,490		
Democratic hold		Swing	▼20.8	

==== Results by county ====
2006 United States Senate election in Massachusetts (by county)
County	Kennedy – D %	Kennedy – D #	Chase – R %	Chase – R #	Others %	Others #	Total #
Barnstable	61.55%	63,412	38.31%	39,471	0.14%	149	103,032
Berkshire	79.34%	36,135	20.60%	9,382	0.05%	25	45,542
Bristol	70.43%	115,125	29.49%	48,204	0.08%	136	163,465
Dukes	76.68%	5,735	23.18%	1,734	0.13%	10	7,479
Essex	66.27%	166,003	33.59%	84,150	0.14%	355	250,508
Franklin	76.52%	21,517	23.36%	6,570	0.11%	32	28,119
Hampden	66.38%	87,430	33.44%	44,040	0.18%	235	131,705
Hampshire	75.51%	41,867	24.34%	13,496	0.14%	79	55,442
Middlesex	70.97%	369,685	28.85%	150,257	0.18%	939	520,881
Nantucket	70.03%	2,759	29.75%	1,172	0.23%	9	3,940
Norfolk	68.50%	172,766	31.36%	79,087	0.15%	372	252,225
Plymouth	62.57%	111,198	37.29%	66,274	0.14%	251	177,723
Suffolk	83.00%	142,018	16.80%	28,753	0.19%	333	171,104
Worcester	64.91%	165,088	34.97%	88,942	0.12%	295	254,325

== See also ==
- 2006 United States Senate elections
