= 1901 United States Senate election in Massachusetts =

- January 15, 1901

Resolution of legislature needed to win
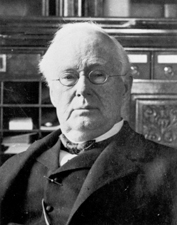

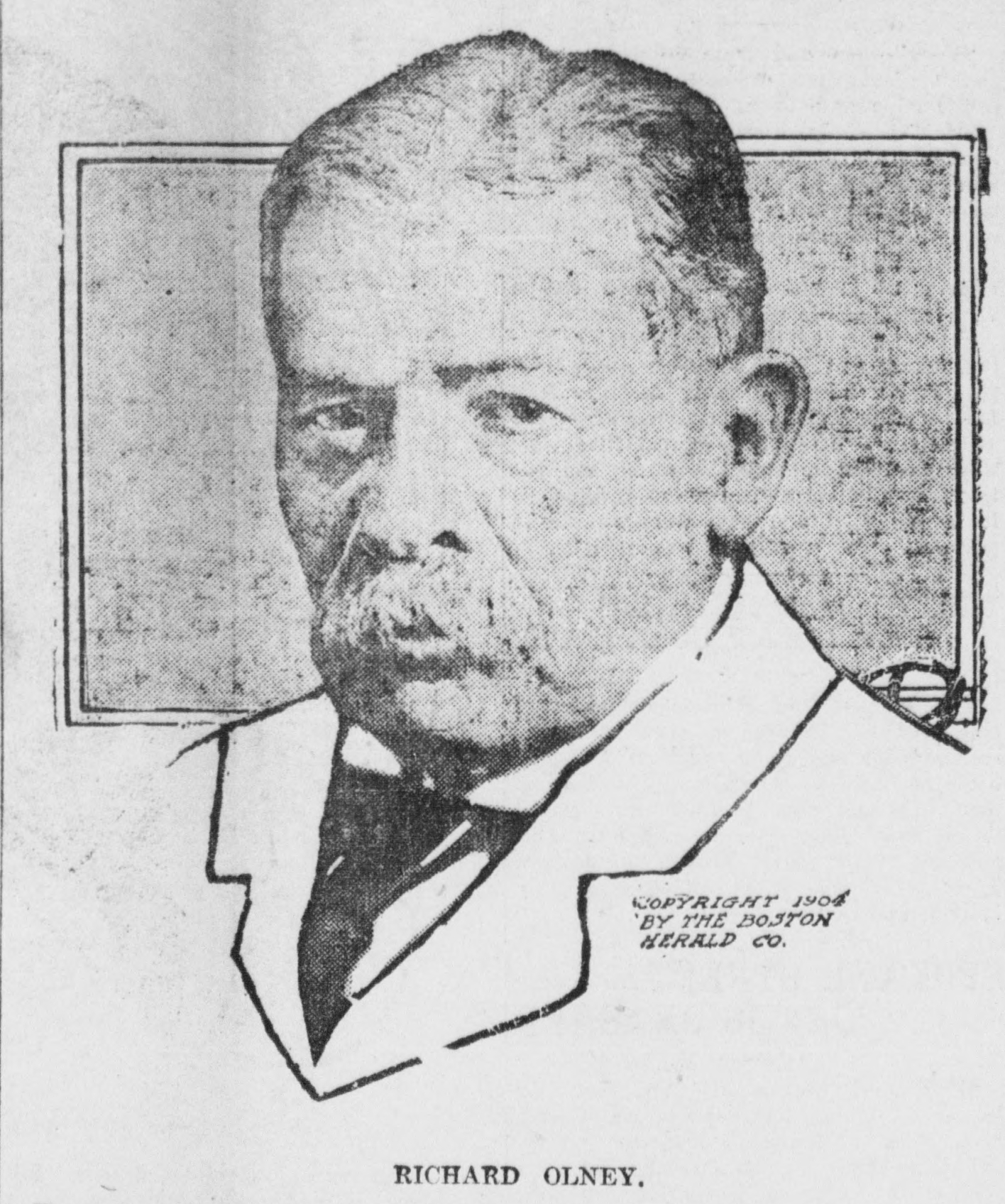
Nominee	George Frisbie Hoar	Richard Olney
Party	Republican	Democratic
Senate	29	8
Percentage	78.38%	21.62%
House	169	48
Percentage	77.52%	22.02%
Senator before election
George Frisbie Hoar
Republican
Elected Senator
George Frisbie Hoar
Republican

The 1901 United States Senate election in Massachusetts was held in January 1901. Incumbent Republican Senator George Frisbie Hoar was re-elected to a fifth term in office.

At the time, Massachusetts elected United States senators by a resolution of the Massachusetts General Court.

== Background ==
=== State legislature ===
At the time, the Massachusetts legislature was controlled by the Republican Party, as it had been since that party's founding, typically in dominant fashion. The Senate was composed of 31 Republicans and 9 Democrats, and the House had 179 Republicans, 58 Democrats, 2 Social Democrats, and one independent.

== Candidates ==
=== Declared ===
- George Frisbie Hoar, incumbent U.S. Senator

Hoar faced no evident opposition from Republicans.

== Election ==
=== Caucuses ===
In caucuses held on January 14, Republicans re-nominated Hoar unanimously.

Democrats, as a matter of party honors, nominated former Secretary of State Richard Olney after several ballots. Many Democrats praised Hoar, and there was a movement to nominate him as their candidate as well. Some argued that nominating Olney for a hopeless campaign would actual diminish his reputation and weaken his prospects for Governor or President. Martin Lomasney, though he pledged to vote for the caucus nominee, compared Hoar to the late William Ewart Gladstone.

=== Election ===
Both houses met separately on January 15 and ratified Hoar's re-election. Hoar received some Democratic votes.

Election in the Senate
Party	Candidate	Votes	%
Republican	George Frisbie Hoar (inc.)	29	78.38%
Democratic	Richard Olney	8	21.62%
Total votes		37	100.00%

Election in the House
Party	Candidate	Votes	%
Republican	George Frisbie Hoar (inc.)	169	77.52%
Democratic	Richard Olney	48	22.02%
Social Democratic	Charles H. Bradley	1	0.46%
Total votes		218	100.00%

On January 16, the houses met in joint convention and announced Hoar's re-election.

== Aftermath ==
Hoar died in October 1904 after over 27 years in the Senate. Winthrop Murray Crane was appointed to fill the vacant seat, and Crane won an election for the remainder of the term in 1905.
