= 1863 United States Senate election in Massachusetts =

- January 15, 1863

40 members of the Massachusetts Senate 235 members of the Massachusetts House of Representatives Majority vote of each house needed to win
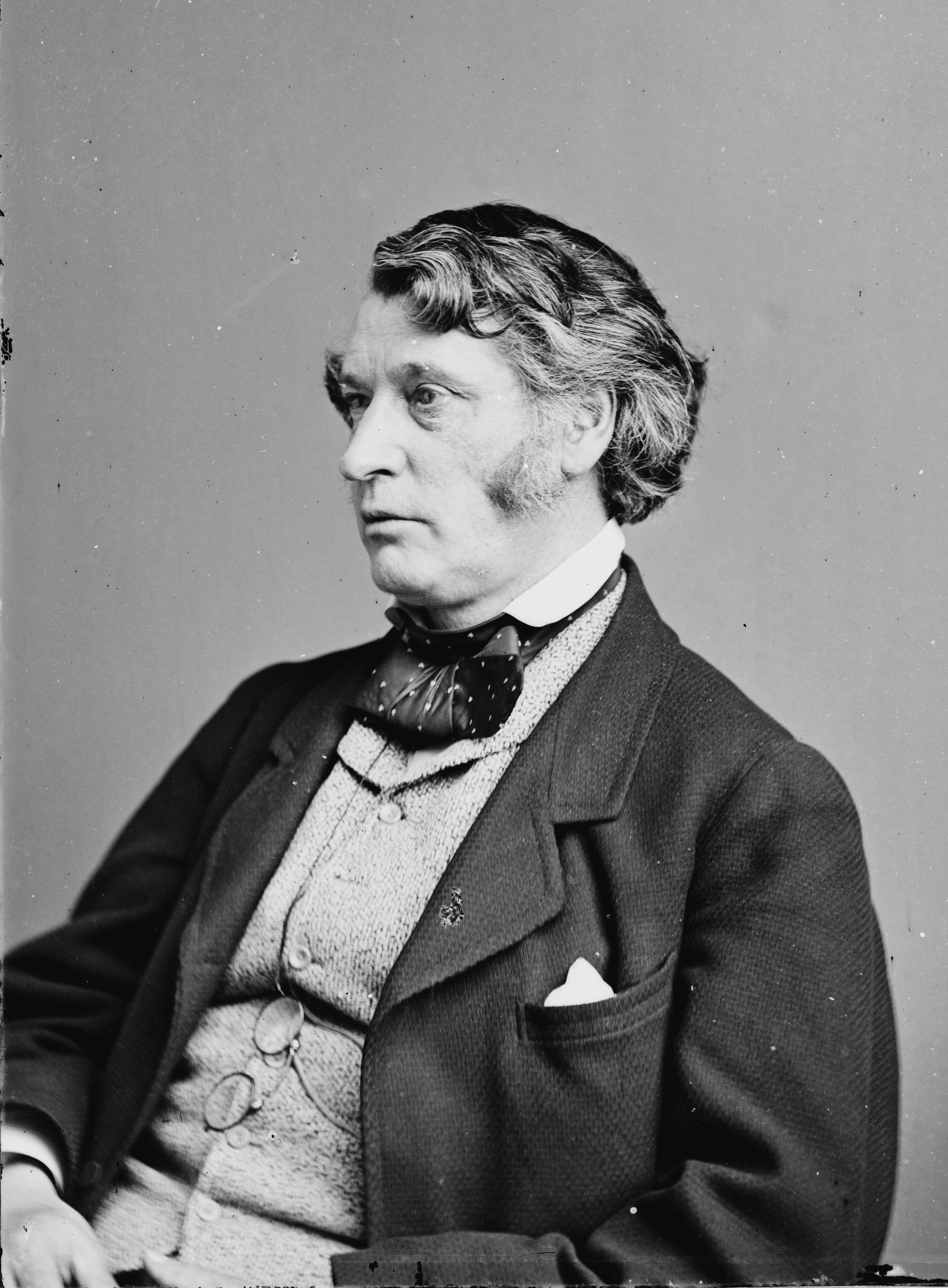

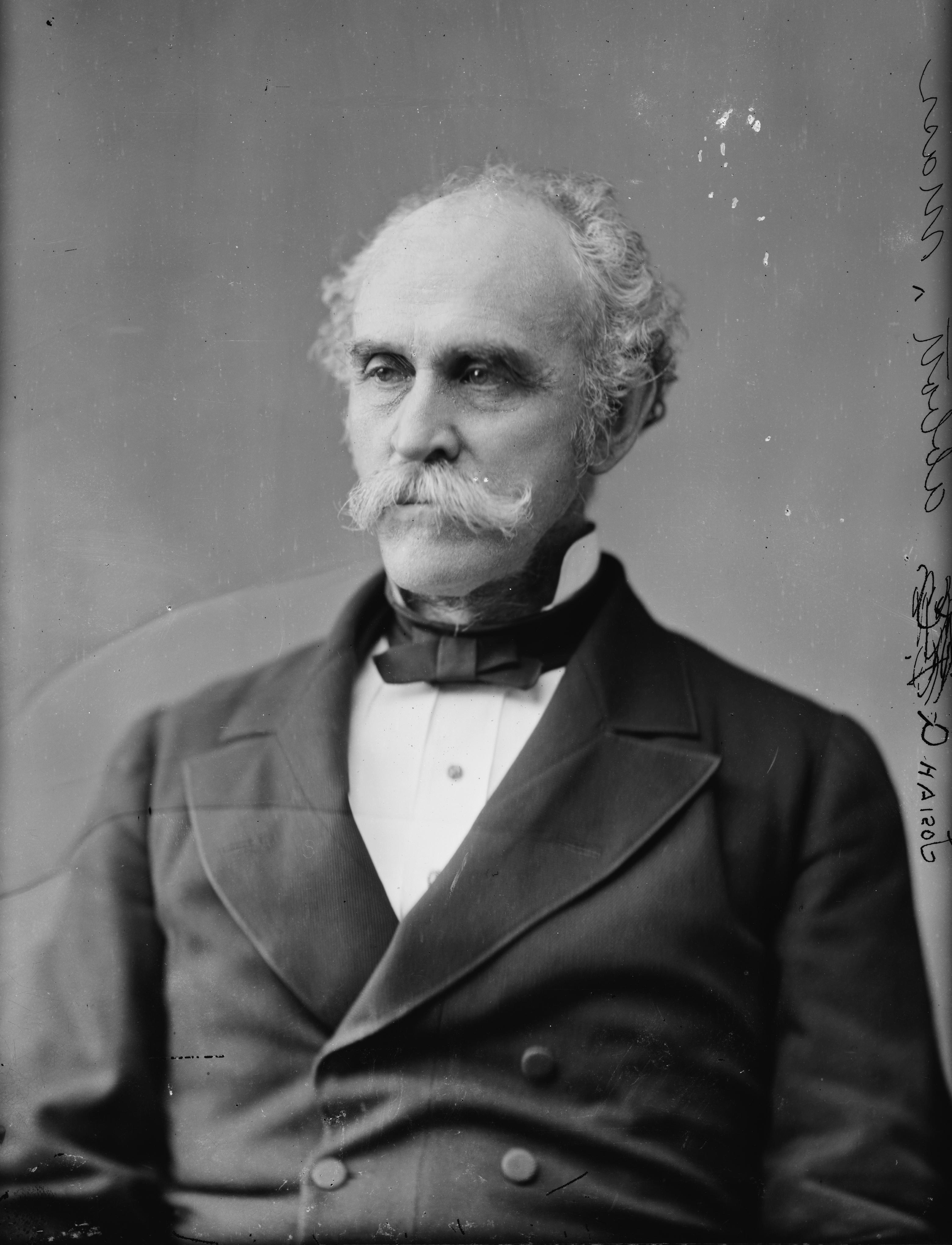
Nominee	Charles Sumner	Josiah Abbott
Party	Republican	People's
Senate	33	5
Percentage	82.5%	12.5%
House	194	38
Percentage	82.55%	16.17%
Senator before election
Charles Sumner
Republican
Elected Senator
Charles Sumner
Republican

The 1863 United States Senate election in Massachusetts was held on January 9, 1863. Incumbent Charles Sumner was re-elected to a third term in office.

At the time of this election, Massachusetts elected United States senators by a majority vote of each house of the Massachusetts General Court.

== Background ==
The Republican state convention met at Worcester, Massachusetts, on September 9, 1862. Sumner had earned the disapproval of Conservative Republicans when he opposed Lincoln's plan for gradual emancipation in March 1862, calling instead for Congress to use its authority under the War Powers Clause to abolish slavery immediately. Seeking to preempt a movement to replace Sumner at the next senatorial election, Sumner's allies took the unusual step of having the state convention endorse his bid for re-election. A resolution endorsing Sumner and approving his course in the Senate passed over the protests of conservative delegates, in effect making Sumner's re-election the central issue of the fall campaign.

Conservative opponents of Sumner held a convention at Boston on October 7, 1862. Many of the organizers of the convention were former Whigs who had supported the Constitutional Union Party in 1860. In a nod to antipartisan wartime rhetoric, the movement called itself the People's Party; its express purpose was to defeat Sumner's bid for reelection. The convention adopted a pro-war, anti-abolitionist platform and selected candidates for the upcoming state elections; Charles F. Adams was nominated for U.S. senator, but declined. The preliminary Emancipation Proclamation, issued September 22, had brought the Lincoln administration into line with Sumner's position, while the endorsement of the People's ticket by the Massachusetts Democratic Party undermined the movement's claim to constitute the true pro-administration party in Massachusetts. Following these events, most Conservative Republicans returned to the fold, and the Republican ticket was elected by a large majority.

== House ==
1863 Senate election in the House
Party	Candidate	Votes	%
Republican	Charles Sumner (incumbent)	194	82.55%
People's	Josiah G. Abbott	38	16.17%
Democratic	Caleb Cushing	2	0.85%
Republican	Charles Francis Adams	1	0.43%
Total votes		235	100.00%

== Senate ==
1863 Senate election in the Senate
Party	Candidate	Votes	%
Republican	Charles Sumner (incumbent)	33	82.5%
People's	Josiah G. Abbott	5	12.5%
Republican	Charles Francis Adams	1	2.5%
None	No vote	1	2.5%
Total votes		40	100.00%

The lone vote for Adams was cast by Senator Whitney of Hampden. Senator Crane of Worcester County did not vote.

== Bibliography ==
- Baum, Dale (1984). The Civil War Party System: The Case of Massachusetts, 1848–1876. Chapel Hill: University of North Carolina Press.
- Donald, David (1970). Charles Sumner and the Rights of Man. New York: Alfred A. Knopf.
- Smith, Adam I. P. (2006). No Party Now: Politics in the Civil War North. New York: Oxford University Press. ISBN 978-0-19-518865-3.
