= 1871 United States Senate election in Massachusetts =

- January 17, 1871

Majority vote of each house needed to win
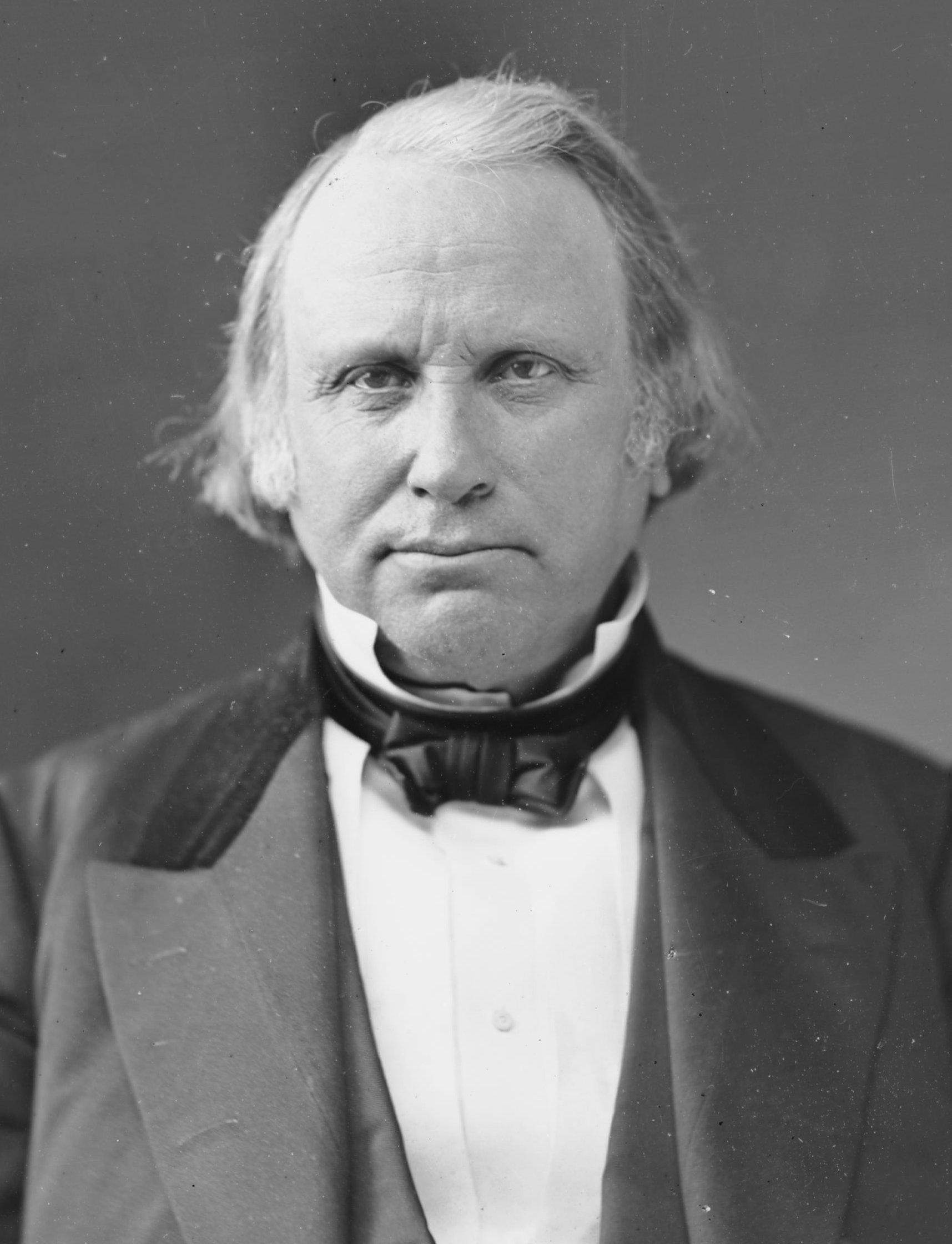

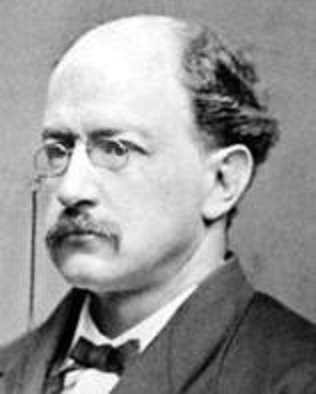
Nominee	Henry Wilson	John Quincy Adams II
Party	Republican	Democratic
Senate	35	4
Percentage	87.5%	10.0%
House	188	32
Percentage	84.3%	14.35%
Senator before election
Henry Wilson
Republican
Elected Senator
Henry Wilson
Republican

The 1871 United States Senate election in Massachusetts was held on January 17, 1871. Incumbent Republican Senator Henry Wilson was re-elected easily to a third term as a member of the Republican Party. Wilson would not finish the term, since he was elected Vice President of the United States in 1872.

At the time, Massachusetts elected United States senators by a majority vote of each separate house of the Massachusetts General Court, the House and the Senate.

== Background ==
At the time, the Massachusetts legislature was dominated the Republican Party, whose members held nearly every seat.

=== Republican caucus ===
On January 16, the Republican Party convened in a caucus to renominated Wilson for his third term.

1871 Republican Senate caucus
Party	Candidate	Votes	%
Republican	Henry Wilson (incumbent)	108	76.60%
Republican	Henry L. Dawes	22	15.60%
Republican	George S. Boutwell	11	7.80%
Total votes		141	100.00%

A caucus opposed to Wilson voted against a motion to nominate Wendell Phillips by 6 votes to 3.

== Election in the House ==
On January 17, the House voted for Wilson's re-election and sent the vote to the Senate for ratification.

1871 U.S. Senate election in the House
Party	Candidate	Votes	%
Republican	Henry Wilson (incumbent)	188	84.30%
Democratic	John Quincy Adams II	32	14.35%
Republican	Wendell Phillips	10	4.48%
Republican	Henry L. Dawes	10	4.48%
Unknown	John Wells Brown (Note: There is a possibility this vote was recorded incorrectly, and was actually cast for the abolitionist and writer William Wells Brown, a resident of Boston at the time. If so, Brown would be the first black man to receive a vote for U.S. Senator from Massachusetts.)	1	0.45%
Total votes		223	100.00%

== Election in the Senate ==
On January 20, the State Senate convened and ratified Wilson's re-election by an overwhelming margin.

1871 U.S. Senate election in the Senate
Party	Candidate	Votes	%
Republican	Henry Wilson (incumbent)	35	87.50%
Democratic	John Quincy Adams II	4	10.00%
Republican	Wendell Phillips	1	2.50%
Total votes		40	100.00%
