= 1859 United States Senate election in Massachusetts =

- January 11 and 12, 1859

40 members of the Massachusetts Senate 396 members of the Massachusetts House Majority vote of each house needed to win
Nominee	Henry Wilson
Party	Republican
Senate	35
Percentage	87.5%
House	199
Percentage	84.69%
Senator before election
Henry Wilson
Republican
Elected Senator
Henry Wilson
Republican

The 1859 United States Senate election in Massachusetts was held during January 1859. Incumbent Senator Henry Wilson, who had been elected in 1855 to fill the unexpired term of Edward Everett, was re-elected easily to a full term as a member of the Republican Party.

At the time, Massachusetts elected United States senators by a majority vote of each separate house of the Massachusetts General Court, the House and the Senate.

== Background ==
At the time, the Massachusetts legislature was dominated by a coalition of Republican Party and American Party supporters, united in opposition to slavery.

== Election in the Senate ==
On January 11, the State Senate convened and re-elected Wilson overwhelmingly, with 35 votes.

1859 U.S. Senate election in the Senate
Party	Candidate	Votes	%
Republican	Henry Wilson (incumbent)	35	87.50%
Republican	George S. Boutwell	3	7.50%
Constitutional Union	Edward Everett	1	2.50%
Democratic	Caleb Cushing	1	2.50%
Total votes		40	100.00%

== Election in the House ==
On January 12, the House ratified the Senate result, electing Wilson to a full term in the U.S. Senate.

1859 U.S. Senate election in the House
Party	Candidate	Votes	%
Republican	Henry Wilson (incumbent)	199	84.69%
Democratic	Caleb Cushing	25	10.64%
Others	Scattering	11	4.68%
Total votes		235	100.00%
