= 1865 United States Senate election in Massachusetts =

- January 10 and 20, 1865

40 members of the Massachusetts Senate 396 members of the Massachusetts House Majority vote of each house needed to win
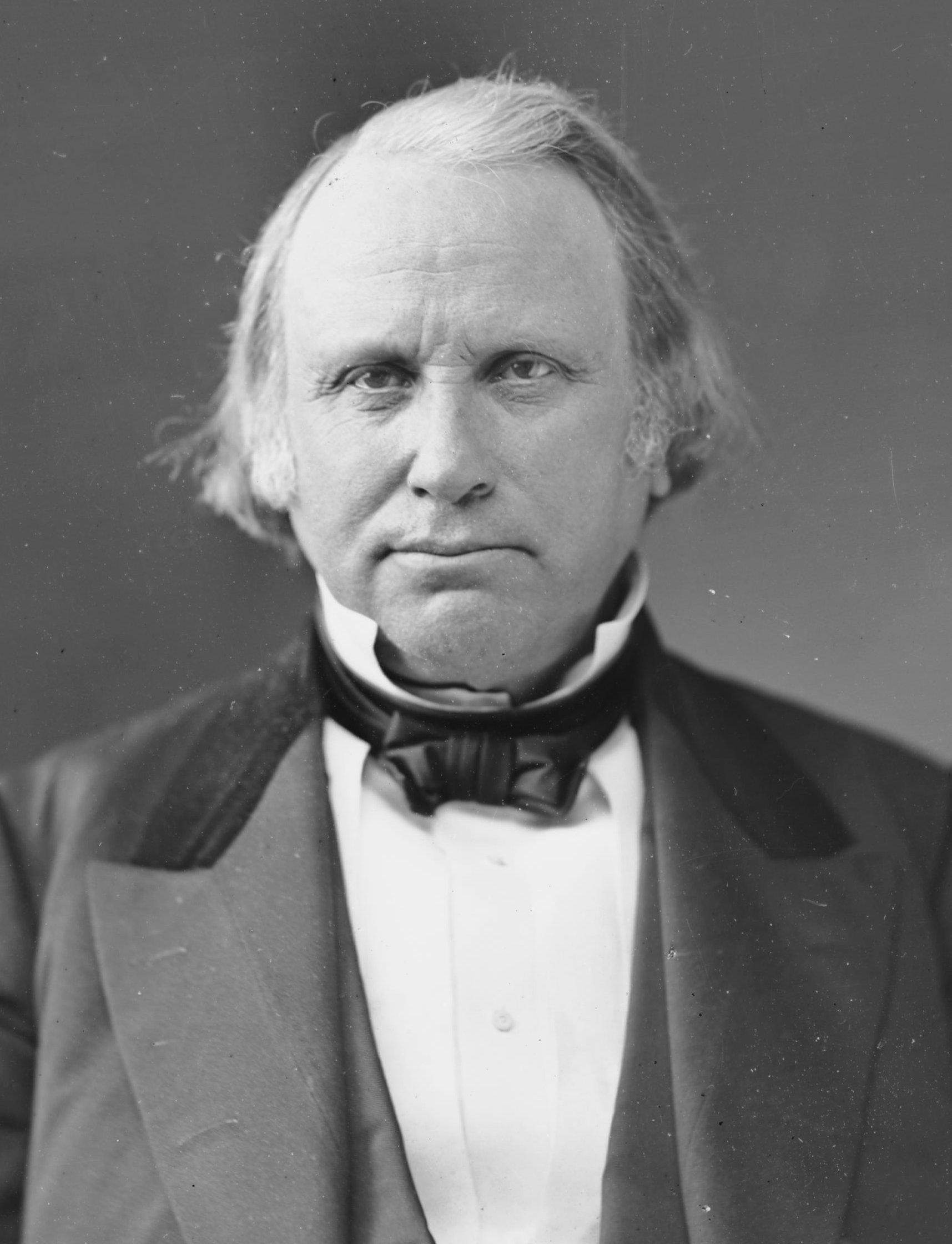

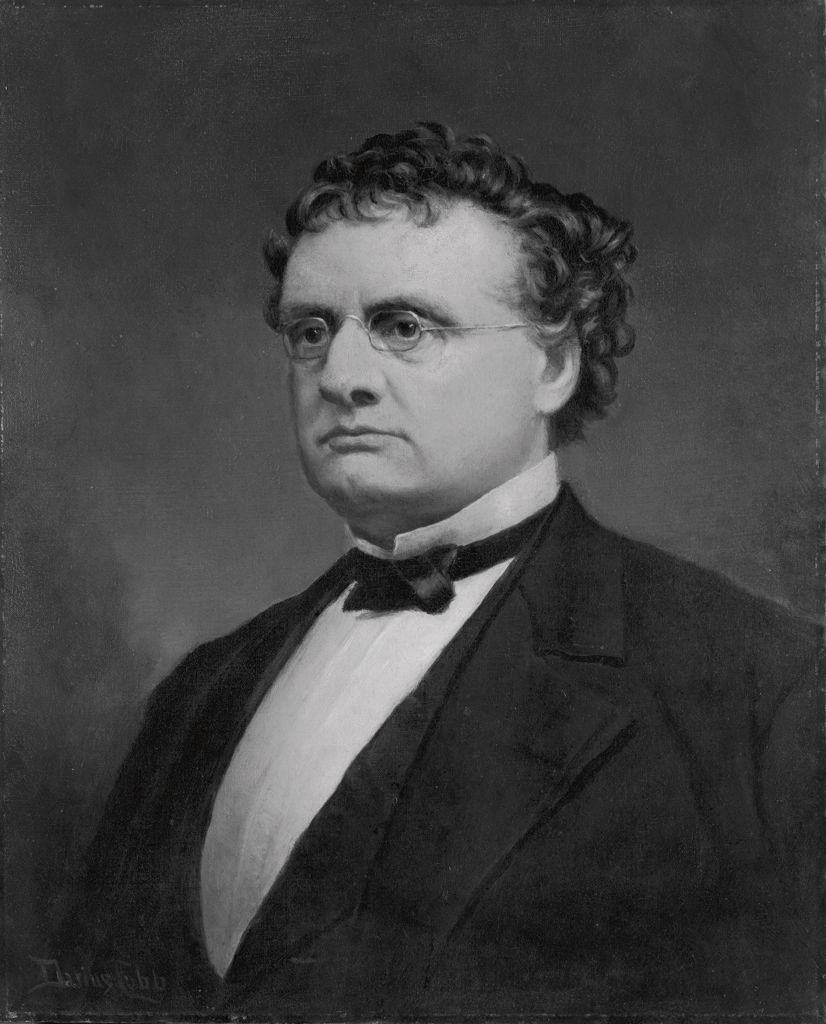
Nominee	Henry Wilson	John Albion Andrew
Party	Republican	Republican
Senate	37	3
Percentage	92.50%	7.5%
House	207	12
Percentage	92.00%	5.33%
Senator before election
Henry Wilson
Republican
Elected Senator
Henry Wilson
Republican

The 1865 United States Senate election in Massachusetts was held during January 1865. Incumbent Republican Senator Henry Wilson was re-elected easily to a second term as a member of the Republican Party.

At the time, Massachusetts elected United States senators by a majority vote of each separate house of the Massachusetts General Court, the House and the Senate.

== Background ==
At the time, the Massachusetts legislature was dominated by the Republican Party, whose members held nearly every seat.

== Election in the House ==
On January 10, the House voted for Wilson's re-election and sent the vote to the Senate for ratification.

1865 U.S. Senate election in the House
Party	Candidate	Votes	%
Republican	Henry Wilson (incumbent)	207	92.00%
Republican	John Albion Andrew	12	5.33%
Democratic	Robert C. Winthrop	4	1.78%
Republican	Alexander Bullock	1	0.44%
	Charles Greely Loring	1	0.44%
Total votes		225	100.00%

== Election in the Senate ==
On January 20, the State Senate convened and ratified Wilson's re-election by an overwhelming margin.

1865 U.S. Senate election in the Senate
Party	Candidate	Votes	%
Republican	Henry Wilson (incumbent)	37	92.50%
Republican	John Albion Andrew	3	7.50%
Total votes		40	100.00%

== Bibliography ==
- Massachusetts (1865). Journal of the House of Representatives [...]. Boston.
- Baum, Dale (1984). The Civil War Party System: The Case of Massachusetts, 1848–1876. Chapel Hill: University of North Carolina Press.
