= 1880–81 United States Senate elections =

- Dates vary by state (And other dates for special elections)
- Class 1

25 of the 76 seats in the United States Senate (with special elections) 39 seats needed for a majority
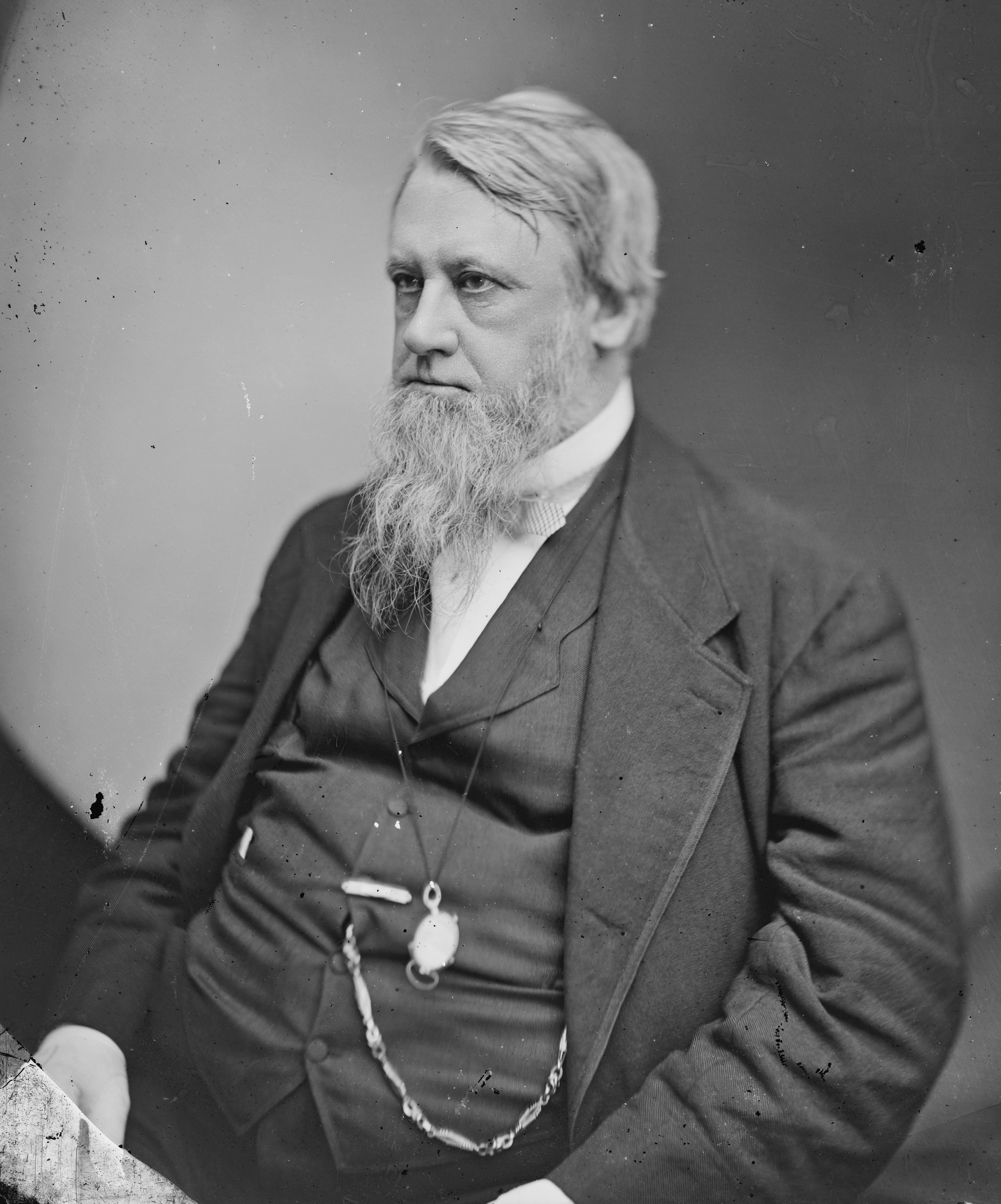

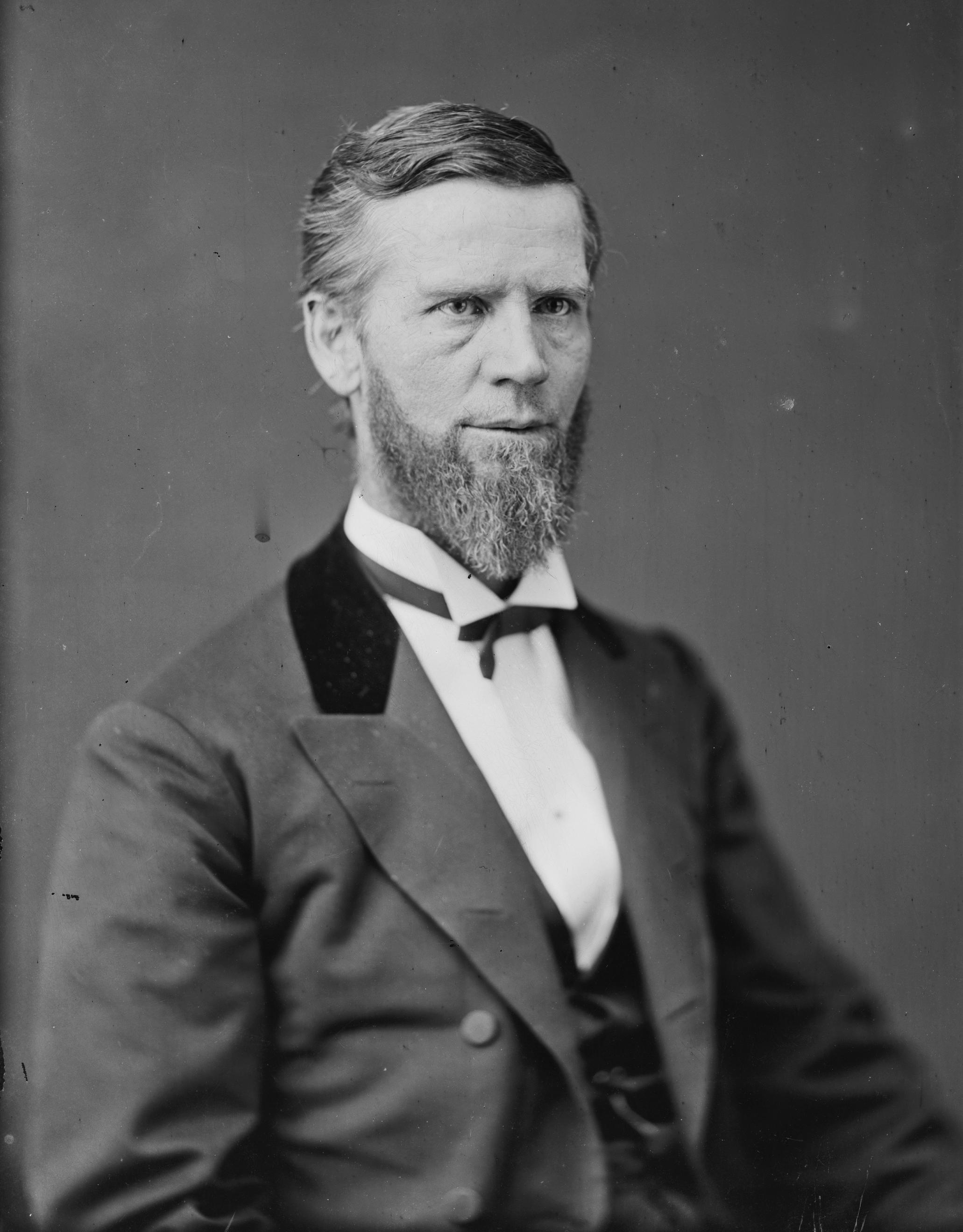
| | Majority party | Minority party |
|---|---|---|
| Leader | Henry B. Anthony (Note: as Republican Conference Chair) | William A. Wallace (Note: as Democratic Caucus Chair) (Lost re-election) |
| Party | Republican | Democratic |
| Leader since | March 4, 1863 | March 4, 1877 |
| Leader's seat | Rhode Island | Pennsylvania |
| Seats before | 32 | 42 |
| Seats won | 15 | 9 |
| Seats after | 37 + VP | 37 |
| Seat change | ▲5 | ▼5 |
| Seats up | 10 | 14 |
| | Third party | Fourth party |
| Party | Readjuster | Independent |
| Seats before | 0 | 1 |
| Seats won | 1 | 0 |
| Seats after | 1 | 1 |
| Seat change | ▲1 | Steady |
| Seats up | 0 | 0 |
| | Fifth party |
| Party | Anti-Monopoly |
| Seats before | 1 |
| Seats won | 0 |
| Seats after | 0 |
| Seat change | ▼1 |
| Seats up | 1 |
- Results of the elections: Democratic gain Democratic hold Republican gain Republican hold Readjuster gain
Majority Party before election
Democratic
Elected Majority Party
Republican

The 1880–81 United States Senate elections were held on various dates in various states, coinciding with the presidential election of 1880. As these U.S. Senate elections were prior to the ratification of the Seventeenth Amendment in 1913, senators were chosen by state legislatures. Senators were elected over a wide range of time throughout 1880 and 1881, and a seat may have been filled months late or remained vacant due to legislative deadlock. In these elections, terms were up for the senators in Class 1.

The Democratic Party lost five seats. The newly elected Readjuster senator William Mahone caucused with the Republicans, and the Republican Vice President's tie-breaking vote gave the Republicans the slightest majority. This changed when Vice President Chester Arthur ascended to the Presidency on September 19, 1881: with the Vice Presidency vacant during the remainder of Arthur's term, the Senate became evenly divided for the first of four times in history.

== Results summary ==
Senate party division, 47th Congress (1881–1883)

- Majority party: Republican (37)
- Minority party: Democratic (37)
- Other parties: Independent (1); Readjuster (1)
- Total seats: 76

== Change in Senate composition ==
=== Before the elections ===
| D_{8} | D_{7} | D_{6} | D_{5} | D_{4} | D_{3} | D_{2} | D_{1} | | |
| D_{9} | D_{10} | D_{11} | D_{12} | D_{13} | D_{14} | D_{15} | D_{16} | D_{17} | D_{18} |
| D_{28} | D_{27} | D_{26} | D_{25} | D_{24} | D_{23} | D_{22} | D_{21} | D_{20} | D_{19} |
| D_{29} Ran | D_{30} Ran | D_{31} Ran | D_{32} Ran | D_{33} Ran | D_{34} Ran | D_{35} Ran | D_{36} Ran | D_{37} Ran | D_{38} Ran |
| Majority → | | | | | | | | | D_{39} Unknown |
| R_{29} Unknown | R_{30} Retired | R_{31} Retired | R_{32} Retired | AM_{1} Retired | I_{1} | D_{42} Retired | D_{41} Unknown | D_{40} Unknown | D_{39} Unknown |
| R_{28} Unknown | R_{27} Ran | R_{26} Ran | R_{25} Ran | R_{24} Ran | R_{23} Ran | R_{22} | R_{21} | R_{20} | R_{19} |
| R_{9} | R_{10} | R_{11} | R_{12} | R_{13} | R_{14} | R_{15} | R_{16} | R_{17} | R_{18} |
| R_{8} | R_{7} | R_{6} | R_{5} | R_{4} | R_{3} | R_{2} | R_{1} | | |

=== After the elections ===
| D_{8} | D_{7} | D_{6} | D_{5} | D_{4} | D_{3} | D_{2} | D_{1} | | |
| D_{9} | D_{10} | D_{11} | D_{12} | D_{13} | D_{14} | D_{15} | D_{16} | D_{17} | D_{18} |
| D_{28} | D_{27} | D_{26} | D_{25} | D_{24} | D_{23} | D_{22} | D_{21} | D_{20} | D_{19} |
| D_{29} Re-elected | D_{30} Re-elected | D_{31} Re-elected | D_{33} Re-elected | D_{33} Hold | D_{34} Hold | D_{35} Hold | D_{36} Gain | D_{37} Gain | I_{1} |
| Plurality ↓ | | | | | | | | | RA_{1} Gain |
| R_{29} Hold | R_{30} Hold | R_{31} Gain | R_{32} Gain | R_{33} Gain | R_{34} Gain | R_{35} Gain | R_{36} Gain | R_{37} Gain | RA_{1} Gain |
| R_{28} Hold | R_{27} Hold | R_{26} Re-elected | R_{25} Re-elected | R_{24} Re-elected | R_{23} Re-elected | R_{22} | R_{21} | R_{20} | R_{19} |
| R_{9} | R_{10} | R_{11} | R_{12} | R_{13} | R_{14} | R_{15} | R_{16} | R_{17} | R_{18} |
| R_{8} | R_{7} | R_{6} | R_{5} | R_{4} | R_{3} | R_{2} | R_{1} | | |

Key:

| AM_{#} | Anti-Monopoly Party |
| D_{#} | Democratic |
| I_{#} | Independent |
| RA_{#} | Readjuster |
| R_{#} | Republican |
| V_{#} | Vacant |

== Race summaries ==
=== Elections during the 46th Congress ===
In these elections, the winners were seated during 1880 or in 1881 before March 4; ordered by election date.

| State | Incumbent | | | Results | Candidates |
| State | Senator | Party | Electoral history | Results | Candidates |
|---|---|---|---|---|---|
| Georgia (Class 3) | John B. Gordon | Democratic | 1873; 1879 | Incumbent resigned to promote a venture for the Georgia Pacific Railway. New senator elected May 26, 1880. Democratic hold. | ▌ ✓ Joseph E. Brown (Democratic); [data missing] |
| Alabama (Class 3) | Luke Pryor | Democratic | 1880 (appointed) | Interim appointee retired or lost election. New senator elected November 23, 1880. Democratic hold. | ▌ ✓ James L. Pugh (Democratic); [data missing] |
| Michigan (Class 1) | Henry P. Baldwin | Republican | 1879 (appointed) | Interim appointee elected January 19, 1881. | ▌ ✓ Henry P. Baldwin (Republican); [data missing] |

=== Races leading to the 47th Congress ===
In these regular elections, the winners were elected for the term beginning March 4, 1881; ordered by state.

All of the elections involved the Class 1 seats.

| State | Incumbent | | | Results | Candidates |
| State | Senator | Party | Electoral history | Results | Candidates |
|---|---|---|---|---|---|
| California | Newton Booth | Anti-Monopoly | 1874 | Incumbent retired. New senator elected in 1880. Republican gain. | ▌ ✓ John F. Miller (Republican) 27; ▌William T. Wallace (Democratic) 11; ▌Henry George (Workingmen's) 2 |
| Connecticut | William W. Eaton | Democratic | 1874 | Incumbent retired or lost re-election. New senator elected in 1881. Republican gain. | ▌ ✓ Joseph R. Hawley (Republican); [data missing] |
| Delaware | Thomas F. Bayard | Democratic | 1869; 1875 | Incumbent re-elected in 1881. | ▌ ✓ Thomas F. Bayard (Democratic); [data missing] |
| Florida | Charles W. Jones | Democratic | 1875 | Incumbent re-elected in 1881. | ▌ ✓ Charles W. Jones (Democratic); [data missing] |
| Indiana | Joseph E. McDonald | Democratic | 1874–75 | Incumbent lost re-election. New senator elected in 1881. Republican gain. | ▌ ✓ Benjamin Harrison (Republican) 81; ▌Joseph E. McDonald (Democratic) 62 |
| Maine | Hannibal Hamlin Sr. | Republican | 1848 (sp.); 1851; 1857 (r.); 1857; 1861 (r.); 1869; 1875 | Incumbent retired. New senator elected. Republican hold. | First ballot (January 18, 1881): ▌ ✓ Eugene Hale (Republican) 83 H; 22 S; ▌Joseph Locke Smith (Democratic) 64 H; 8 S; ▌Harris Merrill Plaisted (Greenback) 0 H; 1 S |
| Maryland | William P. Whyte | Democratic | 1868 (appointed); 1869 (retired); 1874 | Incumbent retired. New senator elected in 1880. Democratic hold. | ▌ ✓ Arthur P. Gorman (Democratic); [data missing] |
| Massachusetts | Henry L. Dawes | Republican | 1875 | Incumbent re-elected in 1881. | ▌ ✓ Henry L. Dawes (Republican); [data missing] |
| Michigan | Henry P. Baldwin | Republican | 1881 (special) | Incumbent retired. Winner elected January 18, 1881. Republican hold. | ▌ ✓ Omar D. Conger (Republican); [data missing] |
| Minnesota | Samuel J. R. McMillan | Republican | 1875 | Incumbent re-elected in 1881. | ▌ ✓ Samuel J. R. McMillan (Republican); [data missing] |
| Mississippi | Blanche Bruce | Republican | 1874 | Incumbent retired or lost re-election. New senator elected in 1880. Democratic gain. | ▌ ✓ James Z. George (Democratic); [data missing] |
| Missouri | Francis Cockrell | Democratic | 1874 | Incumbent re-elected in 1881. | ▌ ✓ Francis Cockrell (Democratic); [data missing] |
| Nebraska | Algernon Paddock | Republican | 1875 | Incumbent lost re-election. New senator elected in 1880. Republican hold. | ▌ ✓ Charles Van Wyck (Republican); ▌Algernon Paddock (Republican); [data missing] |
| Nevada | William Sharon | Republican | 1875 | Incumbent retired or lost re-election. New senator elected January 12, 1881. Democratic gain. | ▌ ✓ James G. Fair (Democratic); [data missing] |
| New Jersey | Theodore F. Randolph | Democratic | 1875 | Unknown if incumbent retired or lost re-election. New senator elected in 1881. Republican gain. | ▌ ✓ William J. Sewell (Republican); ▌Theodore F. Randolph (Democratic); [data missing] |
| New York | Francis Kernan | Democratic | 1875 | Incumbent lost re-election. New senator elected January 20, 1881. Republican gain. | ▌ ✓ Thomas C. Platt (Republican); ▌Francis Kernan (Democratic); [data missing] |
| Ohio | Allen G. Thurman | Democratic | 1868; 1874 | Incumbent lost re-election. New senator elected in 1880. Republican gain. | ▌ ✓ John Sherman (Republican); ▌Allen G. Thurman (Democratic); [data missing] |
| Pennsylvania | William A. Wallace | Democratic | 1875 | Incumbent lost re-election. New senator elected February 23, 1881. Republican gain. | ▌ ✓ John I. Mitchell (Republican) 59.76%; ▌William A. Wallace (Democratic) 36.65% |
| Rhode Island | Ambrose Burnside | Republican | 1874 | Incumbent re-elected in 1880. | ▌ ✓ Ambrose Burnside (Republican); [data missing] |
| Tennessee | James E. Bailey | Democratic | 1877 (special) | Incumbent lost re-election. New senator elected in 1880 or 1881. Democratic hold. | ▌ ✓ Howell E. Jackson (Democratic); [data missing] |
| Texas | Samuel B. Maxey | Democratic | 1875 | Incumbent re-elected January 26, 1881. | ▌ ✓ Samuel B. Maxey (Democratic) 73; ▌ James W. Throckmorton (Democratic) 42; ▌ Edmund J. Davis (Republican) 6; ▌ John H. Reagan (Democratic) 1 |
| Vermont | George F. Edmunds | Republican | 1866 (appointed); 1866 (special); 1868; 1874 | Incumbent re-elected in 1880. | ▌ ✓ George F. Edmunds (Republican); [data missing] |
| Virginia | Robert E. Withers | Democratic | 1875 | Incumbent lost re-election. New senator elected in 1881. Readjuster gain. Winner caucused with the Republicans. | ▌ ✓ William Mahone (Readjuster); [data missing] |
| West Virginia | Frank Hereford | Democratic | 1877 (special) | Incumbent retired or lost re-election. New senator elected in 1880 or 1881. Democratic hold. | ▌ ✓ Johnson N. Camden (Democratic); [data missing] |
| Wisconsin | Angus Cameron | Republican | 1875 | Incumbent retired. New senator elected January 26, 1881. Republican hold. | ▌ ✓ Philetus Sawyer (Republican) 75.38%; ▌James G. Jenkins (Democratic) 22.31%; ▌C. C. Washburn (Republican) 1.54%; ▌Charles D. Parker (Democratic) 0.77% |

=== Elections during the 47th Congress ===
In these elections, the winners were elected in 1881 after March 4; ordered by date.

| State | Incumbent | | | Results | Candidates |
| State | Senator | Party | Electoral history | Results | Candidates |
|---|---|---|---|---|---|
| Wisconsin (Class 3) | Matthew H. Carpenter | Republican | 1869; 1875 (lost); 1879 | Incumbent died February 24, 1881. New senator elected March 10, 1881. Republican hold. | ▌ ✓ Angus Cameron (Republican) 78.23%; ▌ William F. Vilas (Democratic) 21.77% |
| Maine (Class 2) | James G. Blaine | Republican | 1876 (appointed); 1877 (special); 1877 | Incumbent resigned March 5, 1881 to become U.S. Secretary of State. New senator elected March 18, 1881. Republican hold. | ▌ ✓ William P. Frye (Republican); [data missing] |
| New York (Class 1) | Thomas C. Platt | Republican | 1881 | Incumbent resigned May 16, 1881 to protest federal appointments in New York. New senator elected July 27, 1881. Republican hold. | ▌ ✓ Warner Miller (Republican); [data missing] |
| New York (Class 3) | Roscoe Conkling | Republican | 1867; 1873; 1879 | Incumbent resigned May 16, 1881 to protest federal appointments in New York. New senator elected July 29, 1881. Republican hold. | ▌ ✓ Elbridge G. Lapham (Republican); [data missing] |
| Rhode Island (Class 1) | Ambrose Burnside | Republican | 1874; 1880 | Incumbent died September 13, 1881. New senator elected October 5, 1881. Republican hold. | ▌ ✓ Nelson W. Aldrich (Republican); [data missing] |
| Minnesota (Class 2) | Alonzo J. Edgerton | Republican | 1881 (appointed) | Interim appointee replaced by successor elected October 30, 1881. Republican hold. | ▌ ✓ William Windom (Republican); [data missing] |
| Virginia (Class 2) | John W. Johnston | Democratic | 1871; 1877 | Incumbent lost re-election for the term beginning March 4, 1883. Winner elected early December 21, 1881. Readjuster gain. Winner caucused with the Republicans. | ▌ ✓ Harrison H. Riddleberger (Readjuster); ▌John W. Johnston (Democratic); [data missing] |

== Maryland ==
1880 United States Senate election in Maryland
- 1880

80 members of the Maryland General Assembly
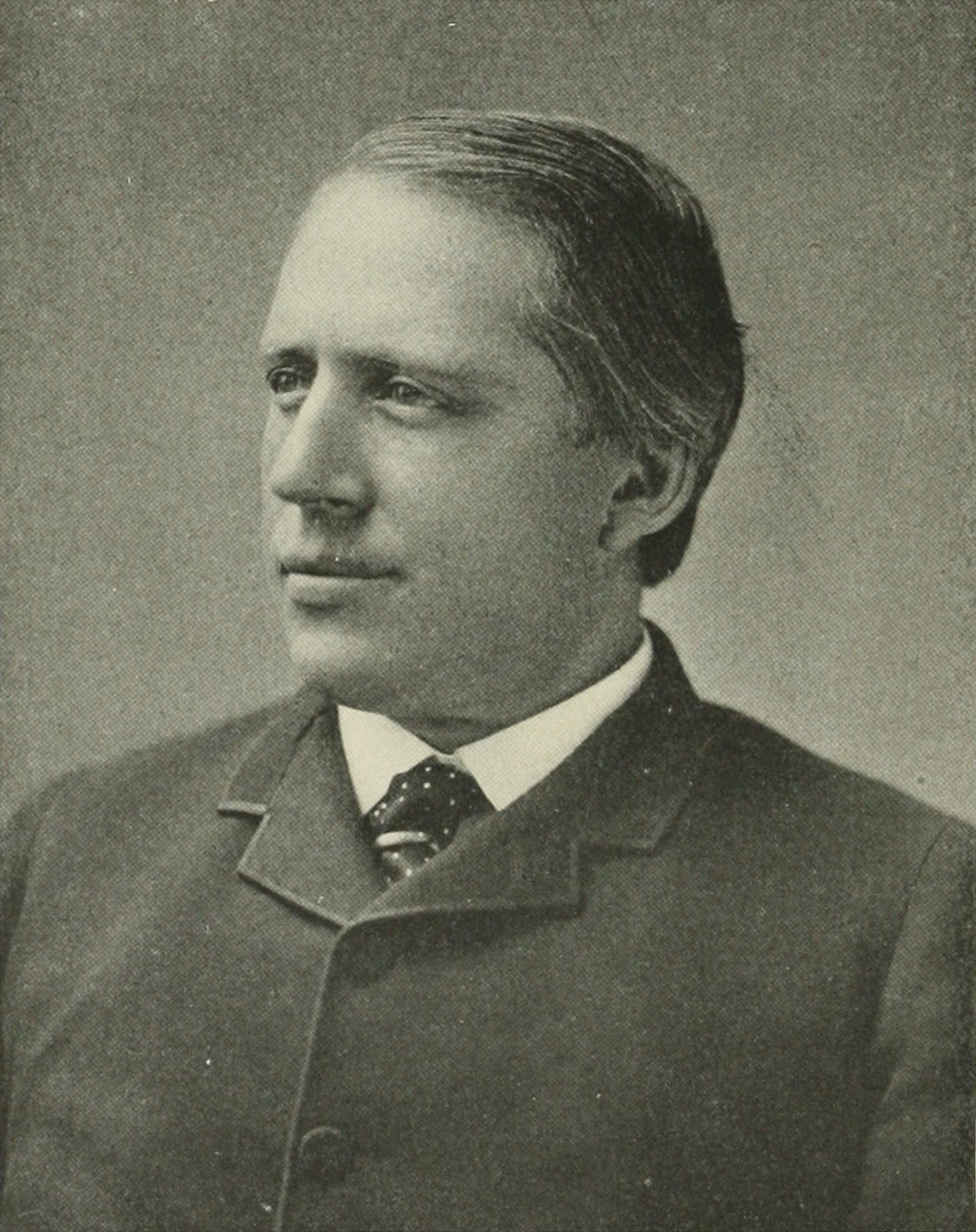

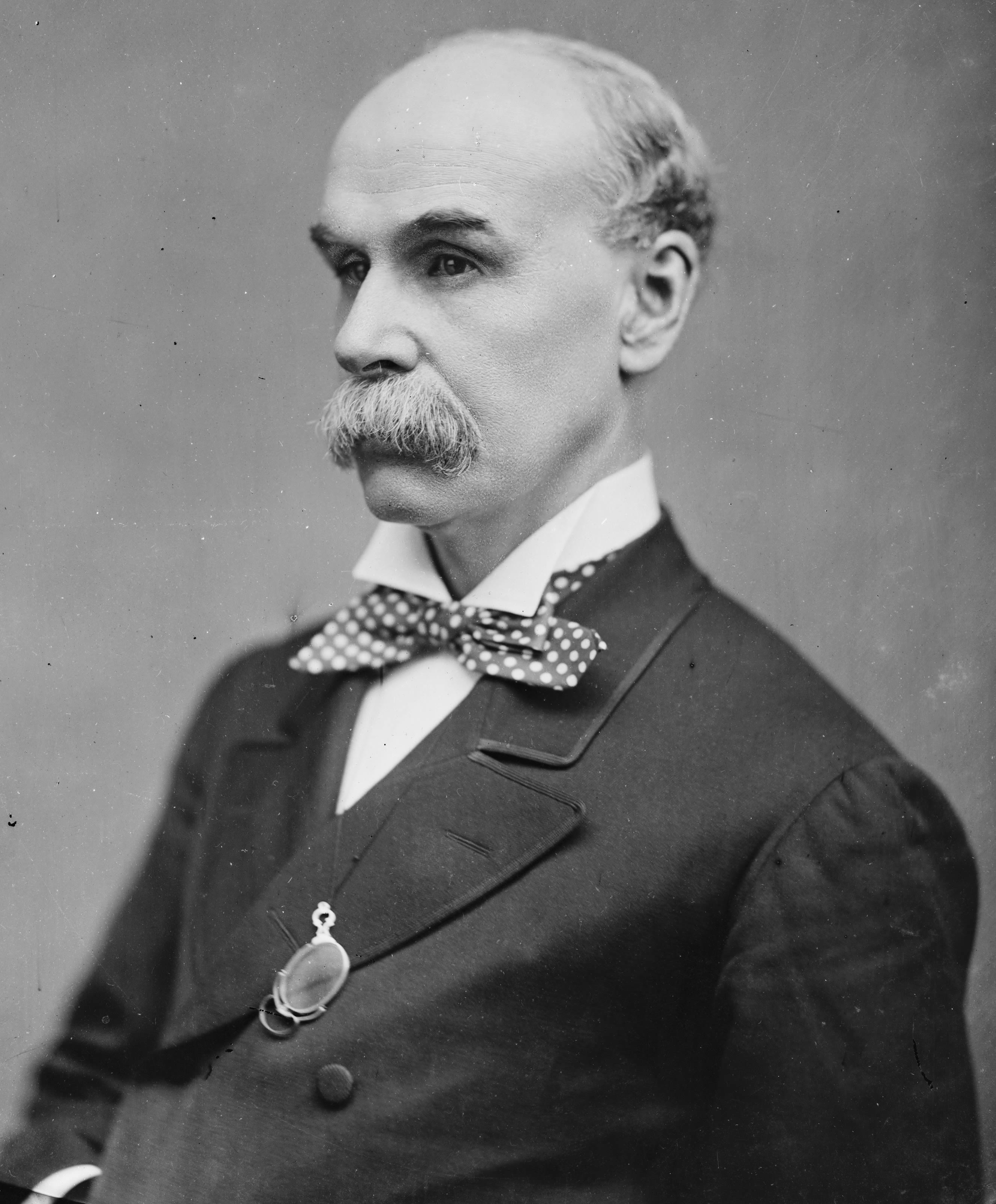
| Candidate | Arthur Pue Gorman | William Pinkney Whyte |
| Party | Democratic | Democratic |
| Legislative vote | - |
| Percentage | -% | % |

Arthur Pue Gorman won election William Pinkney Whyte for an unknown margin of votes for the Class 1 seat.

== Nevada ==
On January 12, 1881, James Graham Fair (Republican) was elected.

== New York ==
The New York election was held January 18, 1881, by the New York State Legislature. Democrat Francis Kernan had been elected in January 1875 to this seat, and his term would expire on March 3, 1881. At the State election in November 1879, 25 Republicans and 7 Democrats were elected for a two-year term (1880–1881) in the State Senate. At the State election in November 1880, 81 Republicans and 47 Democrats were elected for the session of 1881 to the Assembly. The 104th State Legislature met from January 4, 1881, on at Albany, New York.

The caucus of Republican State legislators met on January 13, State Senator Dennis McCarthy presided. All but one of the legislators were present, only State Senator Edward M. Madden (13th D.) was absent. The caucus nominated Ex-Congressman Thomas C. Platt for the U.S. Senate. Platt was a friend of the other U.S. Senator from New York, Roscoe Conkling, and belonged to the Stalwart faction. The opposing Half-Breeds (in the press sometimes referred to as the "anti-machine men") at first wanted to nominate Chauncey M. Depew, but he withdrew before balloting. The majority of the Half-Breeds, led by President pro tempore of the State Senate William H. Robertson, then supported Platt, a minority voted for Sherman S. Rogers, the defeated Republican candidate for Lieutenant Governor of New York in 1876. Congressman Richard Crowley was supported by a faction led by Speaker of the State Assembly George H. Sharpe, allied with Governor Alonzo B. Cornell. U.S. Vice President William A. Wheeler, and Congressmen Elbridge G. Lapham and Levi P. Morton also received votes.

1881 Republican caucus for United States Senator result
| Office | Candidate | First ballot |
|---|---|---|
| U.S. Senator | Thomas C. Platt | 54 |
| | Richard Crowley | 26 |
| | Sherman S. Rogers | 10 |
| | William A. Wheeler | 10 |
| | Elbridge G. Lapham | 4 |
| | Levi P. Morton | 1 |

The caucus of the Democratic State legislators met on January 17, State Senator Charles A. Fowler (14th D.) presided. They re-nominated the incumbent U.S. Senator Francis Kernan by acclamation.

Thomas C. Platt was the choice of both the State Senate and the Assembly, and was declared elected.

1881 United States Senator election result
| House | Republican | | Democrat | |
|---|---|---|---|---|
| State Senate (32 members) | Thomas C. Platt | 25 | Francis Kernan | 6 |
| State Assembly (128 members) | Thomas C. Platt | 79 | Francis Kernan | 44 |

Notes:

- The votes were cast on January 18, but both Houses met in a joint session on January 19 to compare nominations, and declare the result.
- State Senator Stevens (Dem., 22nd D.) was absent and did not vote.

== Pennsylvania ==
The Pennsylvania election was held on thirty separate dates from January to February 1881. On February 23, 1881, John I. Mitchell was elected by the Pennsylvania General Assembly. The Pennsylvania General Assembly, consisting of the House of Representatives and the Senate, convened on January 27, 1881, to elect a Senator to serve the term beginning on March 4, 1881. Thirty-five ballots were recorded on thirty separate dates spanning from January 27 to February 23, 1881. The results of the thirty-fifth and final ballot of both houses combined are as follows:

State legislature results
| Party | Candidate | Votes | % |
|---|---|---|---|
| Republican | John I. Mitchell | 150 | 59.76 |
| Democratic | William A. Wallace (Incumbent) | 92 | 36.65% |
| N/A | Not voting | 7 | 2.79% |
| N/A | Other | 2 | 0.80% |
| Total votes | | 251 | 100% |

== See also ==
- 1880 United States elections
  - 1880 United States presidential election
  - 1880 United States House of Representatives elections
- 46th United States Congress
- 47th United States Congress
