= 1874–75 United States Senate elections =

- Dates vary by state (And other dates for special elections)
- Class 1

25 of the 74 seats in the United States Senate (with special elections) 38 seats needed for a majority
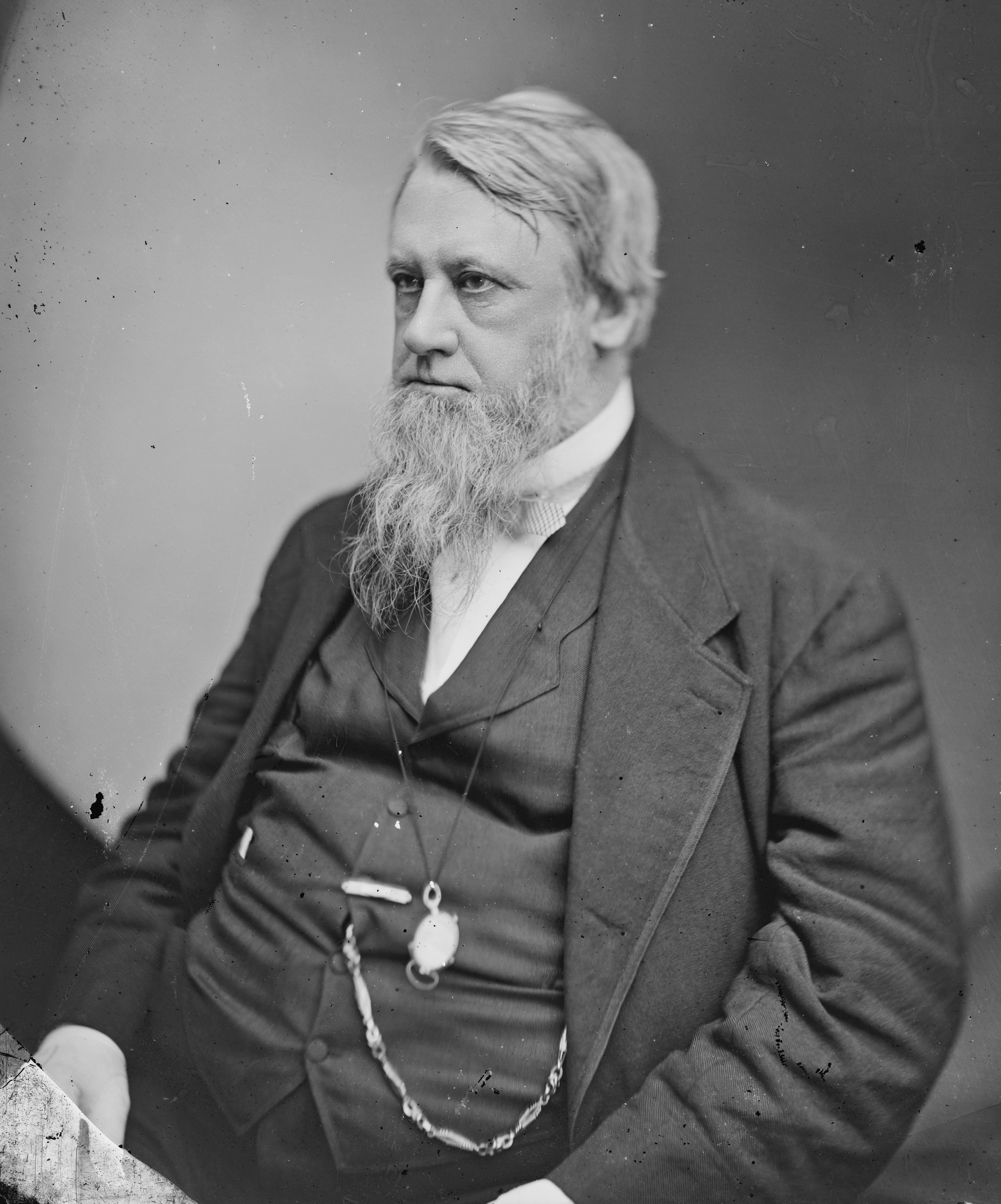

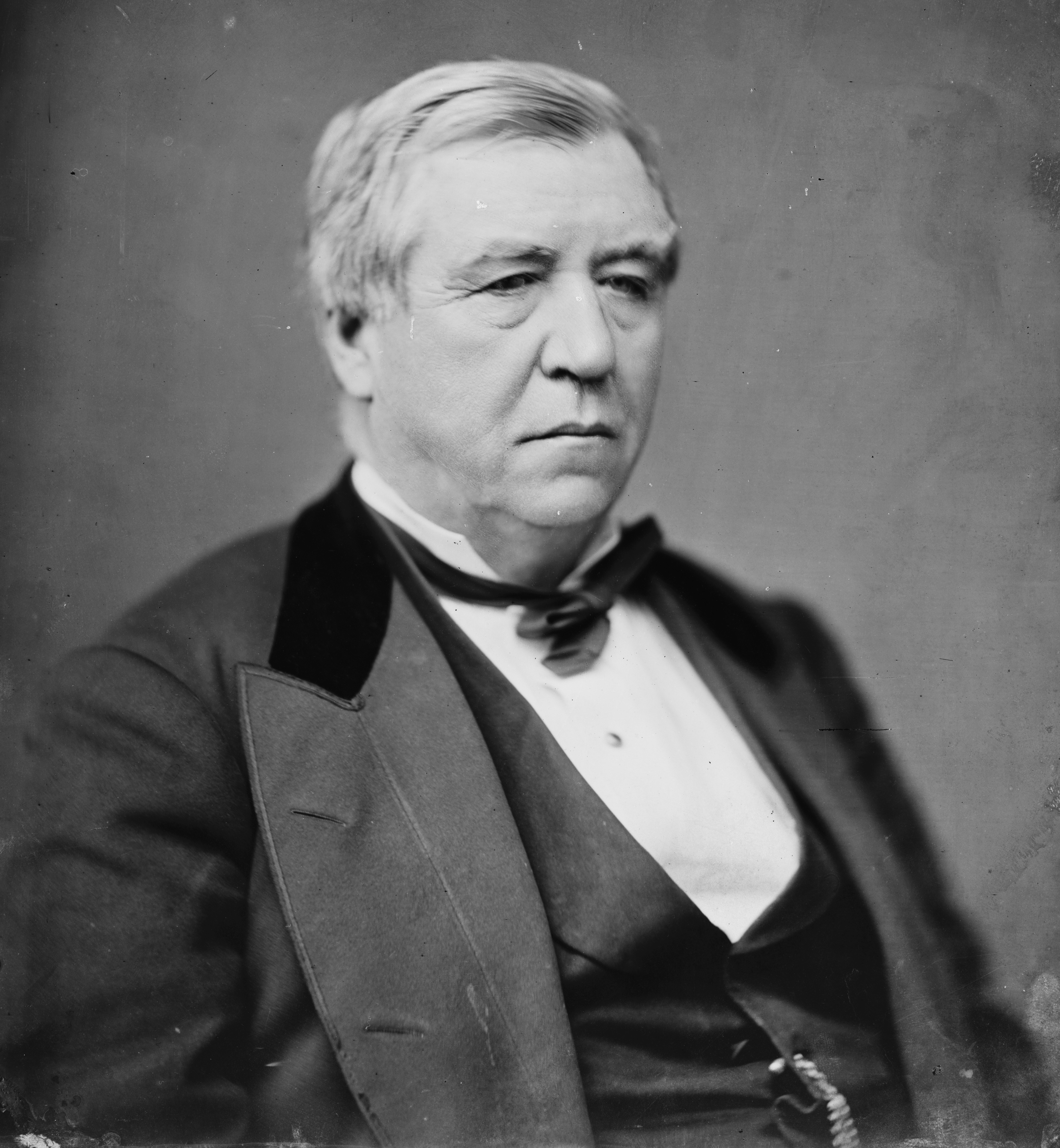
	Majority party	Minority party
Leader	Henry B. Anthony (Note: as Republican Conference Chair)	John W. Stevenson (Note: as Democratic Caucus Chair)
Party	Republican	Democratic
Leader since	March 4, 1863	March 4, 1873
Leader's seat	Rhode Island	Kentucky
Seats before	52	19
Seats won	10	14
Seats after	42	28
Seat change	▼10	▲9
Seats up	20	5
	Third party	Fourth party
Party	Liberal Republican	Anti-Monopoly
Seats before	2	0
Seats won	0	1
Seats after	2	1
Seat change	Steady	▲1
Seats up	0	0
- Results of the elections: Democratic gain Democratic hold Republican hold Anti-monopoly gain
Majority Party before election
Republican
Elected Majority Party
Republican

The 1874–75 United States Senate elections were held on various dates in various states. As these U.S. Senate elections were prior to the ratification of the Seventeenth Amendment in 1913, senators were chosen by state legislatures. Senators were elected over a wide range of time throughout 1874 and 1875, and a seat may have been filled months late or remained vacant due to legislative deadlock. In these elections, terms were up for the senators in Class 1.

Although the Republican Party (the party of incumbent President Ulysses S. Grant) maintained their Senate majority, the Democratic Party gained nine seats.

== Results summary ==
Colored shading indicates party with largest share of that row.

Parties					Total
Parties	Democratic	Republican	Liberal Republican	Anti- Monopoly	Total
Before these elections	19	52	2	0	73
Not up	14	32	2	—	48
Class 2 (1870/71)	9	15	1	—	25
Class 3 (1872/73)	5	17	1	—	31
Up	5	22	1	—	36
Regular: Class 1	5	20	—	—	25
Special: Class 1	0	1	1	—	2
Special: Class 2	0	1	—	—	1
Incumbent retired	2	11	—	—	13
Held by same party	1	4	—	—	5
Replaced by other party	▼7 Republicans replaced by ▲7 Democrats ▼1 Democrat replaced by ▲1 Anti-Monopolist				▲▼8
Result	8	4	—	1	13
Incumbent's intent unknown	1	4	—	—	5
Held by same party	1	2	—	—	3
Replaced by other party	▼2 Republicans replaced by ▲2 Democrats				▲▼2
Result	3	2	—	—	5
Incumbent ran	2	5	—	—	7
Won re-election	2	2	—	—	4
Lost re-election	▼1 Republican replaced by ▲1 Democrat				1
Lost renomination but held by same party	—	2	—	—	2
Result	3	4	—	—	7
Total elected	14	10	—	1	25
Net change	▲9	▼10	—	▲1	▲▼9
Result	28	42	2	1	73

== Change in Senate composition ==
=== Before the elections ===
After the April 17, 1874, special election in Massachusetts.

D_{7}	D_{6}	D_{5}	D_{4}	D_{3}	D_{2}	D_{1}			
D_{8}	D_{9}	D_{10}	D_{11}	D_{12}	D_{13}	D_{14}	D_{15} Ran	D_{16} Ran	D_{17} Unknown
R_{48} Retired	R_{49} Retired	R_{50} Retired	R_{51} Retired	R_{52} Retired	LR_{1}	LR_{2}	V_{1}	D_{19} Retired	D_{18} Retired
R_{47} Retired	R_{46} Retired	R_{45} Retired	R_{44} Retired	R_{43} Retired	R_{42} Retired	R_{41} Retired	R_{40} Unknown	R_{39} Unknown	R_{38} Unknown
Majority →									R_{37} Ran
R_{28}	R_{29}	R_{30}	R_{31}	R_{32}	R_{33} Ran	R_{34} Ran	R_{35} Ran	R_{36} Ran	R_{37} Ran
R_{27}	R_{26}	R_{25}	R_{24}	R_{23}	R_{22}	R_{21}	R_{20}	R_{19}	R_{18}
R_{8}	R_{9}	R_{10}	R_{11}	R_{12}	R_{13}	R_{14}	R_{15}	R_{16}	R_{17}
R_{7}	R_{6}	R_{5}	R_{4}	R_{3}	R_{2}	R_{1}			

=== Result of the elections ===
D_{7}	D_{6}	D_{5}	D_{4}	D_{3}	D_{2}	D_{1}			
D_{8}	D_{9}	D_{10}	D_{11}	D_{12}	D_{13}	D_{14}	D_{15} Re-elected	D_{16} Re-elected	D_{17} Hold
D_{27} Gain	D_{26} Gain	D_{25} Gain	D_{24} Gain	D_{23} Gain	D_{22} Gain	D_{21} Gain	D_{20} Gain	D_{19} Gain	D_{18} Hold
D_{28} Gain	AM_{1} Gain	V_{1}	LR_{2}	LR_{1}	R_{42} Hold	R_{41} Hold	R_{40} Hold	R_{39} Hold	R_{38} Hold
Majority →									R_{37} Hold
R_{28}	R_{29}	R_{30}	R_{31}	R_{32}	R_{33} Re-elected	R_{34} Re-elected	R_{35} Hold	R_{36} Hold	R_{37} Hold
R_{27}	R_{26}	R_{25}	R_{24}	R_{23}	R_{22}	R_{21}	R_{20}	R_{19}	R_{18}
R_{8}	R_{9}	R_{10}	R_{11}	R_{12}	R_{13}	R_{14}	R_{15}	R_{16}	R_{17}
R_{7}	R_{6}	R_{5}	R_{4}	R_{3}	R_{2}	R_{1}			

=== Beginning of the next Congress ===
D_{7}	D_{6}	D_{5}	D_{4}	D_{3}	D_{2}	D_{1}			
D_{8}	D_{9}	D_{10}	D_{11}	D_{12}	D_{13}	D_{14}	D_{15}	D_{16}	D_{17}
D_{27}	D_{26}	D_{25}	D_{24}	D_{23}	D_{22}	D_{21}	D_{20}	D_{19}	D_{18}
D_{28}	AM_{1}	V_{1}	R_{44} Change	R_{43} Change	R_{42}	R_{41}	R_{40}	R_{39}	R_{38}
Majority →									R_{37}
R_{28}	R_{29}	R_{30}	R_{31}	R_{32}	R_{33}	R_{34}	R_{35}	R_{36}	R_{37}
R_{27}	R_{26}	R_{25}	R_{24}	R_{23}	R_{22}	R_{21}	R_{20}	R_{19}	R_{18}
R_{8}	R_{9}	R_{10}	R_{11}	R_{12}	R_{13}	R_{14}	R_{15}	R_{16}	R_{17}
R_{7}	R_{6}	R_{5}	R_{4}	R_{3}	R_{2}	R_{1}			

Key:

AM_{#}	Anti-Monopoly Party
D_{#}	Democratic
LR_{#}	Liberal Republican
R_{#}	Republican
V_{#}	Vacant

== Race summaries ==
=== Elections during the 43rd Congress ===
In these elections, the winners were seated during 1874 or in 1875 before March 4; ordered by election date.

State	Incumbent			Results	Candidates
State	Senator	Party	Electoral history	Results	Candidates
Kansas (Class 2)	Robert Crozier	Republican	1873 (appointed)	Interim appointee retired February 2, 1874. New senator elected February 2, 1874. Republican hold.	▌ ✓ James M. Harvey (Republican); [data missing]
Mississippi (Class 1)	Adelbert Ames	Republican	1870	Incumbent resigned March 17, 1873, to become Governor of Mississippi. New senator elected February 3, 1874. Republican hold. Winner did not run for the next term; see below.	▌ ✓ Henry R. Pease (Republican); [data missing]
Massachusetts (Class 1)	Charles Sumner	Liberal; Republican	1851 (special); 1857; 1863; 1869	Incumbent died March 12, 1874. New senator elected April 17, 1874. Republican gain. Winner did not run for the next term; see below.	▌ ✓ William B. Washburn (Republican); [data missing]

=== Races leading to the 44th Congress ===
In these regular elections, the winners were elected for the term beginning March 4, 1875; ordered by state.

All of the elections involved the Class 1 seats.

State	Incumbent			Results	Candidates
State	Senator	Party	Electoral history	Results	Candidates
California	Eugene Casserly	Democratic	1868	Incumbent resigned November 29, 1873. New senator elected early December 20, 1873. Anti-Monopoly gain.	▌ ✓ Newton Booth (Anti-Monopoly) 60; [data missing]
Connecticut	William A. Buckingham	Republican	1868–69	Incumbent lost re-election. New senator elected May 19, 1874. Democratic gain. Incumbent died February 5, 1875, and Eaton was appointed to finish the term.	▌ ✓ William W. Eaton (Democratic) 59.95%; ▌William A. Buckingham (Republican) 32.39%; ▌Joseph R. Hawley (Republican) 4.45%; ▌Charles R. Ingersoll (Democratic) 1.62%; Others 1.62%
Delaware	Thomas F. Bayard	Democratic	1869	Incumbent re-elected in 1875.	▌ ✓ Thomas F. Bayard (Democratic); [data missing]
Florida	Abijah Gilbert	Republican	1868–69	Incumbent retired. New senator elected in 1875. Democratic gain.	▌ ✓ Charles W. Jones (Democratic); [data missing]
Indiana	Daniel D. Pratt	Republican	1868	Incumbent retired. New senator elected in 1874 or 1875. Democratic gain.	▌ ✓ Joseph E. McDonald (Democratic); [data missing]
Maine	Hannibal Hamlin Sr.	Republican	1848 (sp.); 1851; 1857 (r.); 1857; 1861 (r.); 1869	Incumbent re-elected.	First ballot (January 19, 1875): ▌ ✓ Hannibal Hamlin Sr. (Republican) 85 H; 27 S; ▌John Coffin Talbot Jr. (Democratic) 50 H; 3 S; ▌Sidney Perham Sr. (Republican) 3 H; 0 S; ▌William Pickering Haines Sr. (Democratic) 1 H; 0 S; ▌Joshua Lawrence Chamberlain Jr. (Republican) 1 H; 0 S; ▌Absent 11 H; 1 S
Maryland	William P. Whyte	Democratic	1874 (appointed)	Incumbent retired to run for Maryland Governor. New senator elected in 1874. Democratic hold.	▌ ✓ William P. Whyte (Democratic); [data missing]
Massachusetts	William B. Washburn	Republican	1874 (special)	Incumbent retired. New senator elected in 1875. Republican hold.	▌ ✓ Henry L. Dawes (Republican); [data missing]
Michigan	Zachariah Chandler	Republican	1857; 1863; 1869	Incumbent lost re-election. New senator elected in 1874. Republican hold.	▌ ✓ Isaac P. Christiancy (Republican); ▌Zachariah Chandler (Republican); [data missing]
Minnesota	Alexander Ramsey	Republican	1863; 1869	Incumbent retired or lost re-election. New senator elected in 1875. Republican hold.	▌ ✓ Samuel J. R. McMillan (Republican); [data missing]
Mississippi	Henry R. Pease	Republican	1874 (special)	Incumbent retired. New senator elected in February 1874. Republican hold.	▌ ✓ Blanche Bruce (Republican); [data missing]
Missouri	Carl Schurz	Republican	1868	Incumbent lost re-election. New senator elected in 1874. Democratic gain.	▌ ✓ Francis Cockrell (Democratic); ▌Carl Schurz (Republican); [data missing]
Nebraska	Thomas Tipton	Republican	1867; 1869	Incumbent retired or lost re-election. New senator elected in 1875. Republican hold.	▌ ✓ Algernon Paddock (Republican); [data missing]
Nevada	William M. Stewart	Republican	1865; 1869	Incumbent retired. New senator elected January 12, 1875. Republican hold.	▌ ✓ William Sharon (Republican); [data missing]
New Jersey	John P. Stockton	Democratic	1864; 1866 (lost dispute); 1869	Unknown if incumbent retired or lost re-election. New senator elected in 1875. Democratic hold.	▌ ✓ Theodore Fitz Randolph (Democratic); [data missing]
New York	Reuben Fenton	Republican	1869	Incumbent retired. New senator elected January 20, 1875. Democratic gain.	▌ ✓ Francis Kernan (Democratic) 87; ▌Edwin D. Morgan (Republican) 68; ▌John T. Hoffman (Democratic) 1
Ohio	Allen G. Thurman	Democratic	1868	Incumbent re-elected in 1874.	▌ ✓ Allen G. Thurman (Democratic); [data missing]
Pennsylvania	John Scott	Republican	1869	Incumbent retired. New senator elected January 19, 1875. Democratic gain.	▌ ✓ William A. Wallace (Democratic) 49.8%; ▌John Allison (Republican) 46.22%
Rhode Island	William Sprague IV	Republican	1862; 1868	Incumbent retired. New senator elected in 1875. Republican hold.	▌ ✓ Ambrose Burnside (Republican); [data missing]
Tennessee	Parson Brownlow	Republican	1867 (early)	Incumbent retired. New senator elected January 26, 1875, on the 54th ballot. Democratic gain.	▌ ✓ Andrew Johnson (Democratic) 52 (Note: Johnson attained 47 votes before switches, four short of a majority.); ▌John C. Brown (Democratic); ▌William B. Bate (Democratic); ▌William A. Quarles (Liberal Republican); ▌John H. Stephens (Democratic); ▌John Houston Savage (Democratic); ▌Gustavus Adolphus Henry Sr. (Democratic)
Texas	James W. Flanagan	Republican	1870 (readmission)	Incumbent retired. (Note: Democrats regained control of the state government following the end of Reconstruction, so Flanagan was not a candidate.); New senator elected on January 28, 1875. Democratic gain.	▌ ✓ Samuel B. Maxey (Democratic) 59; ▌James W. Throckmorton (Democratic) 40; ▌Edward T. Randle (Republican) 13
Vermont	George F. Edmunds	Republican	1866 (appointed); 1866 (special); 1868	Incumbent re-elected on October 20, 1874.	▌ ✓ George F. Edmunds (Republican) 279; ▌Edward J. Phelps (Democratic) 49; ▌Charles W. Willard (Republican) 13
Virginia	John F. Lewis	Republican	1870 (readmission)	Incumbent retired. New senator elected in 1875. Democratic gain.	▌ ✓ Robert E. Withers (Democratic); [data missing]
West Virginia	Arthur I. Boreman	Republican	1868–69	Incumbent retired. New senator elected in 1874 or 1875. Democratic gain.	▌ ✓ Allen T. Caperton (Democratic); [data missing]
Wisconsin	Matthew H. Carpenter	Republican	1869	Incumbent lost re-election. New senator elected February 3, 1875. Republican hold.	▌ ✓ Angus Cameron (Republican); ▌Matthew H. Carpenter (Republican); ▌George C. Hazelton (Republican); ▌Orsamus Cole (Republican); ▌Edward S. Bragg (Democratic); ▌Cadwallader C. Washburn (Republican); ▌Luther S. Dixon (Republican)

=== Elections during the 44th Congress ===
There were no special elections in 1875 to the 44th Congress.

== Maryland ==
1874 United States Senate election in Maryland
- 1874

80 members of the Maryland General Assembly
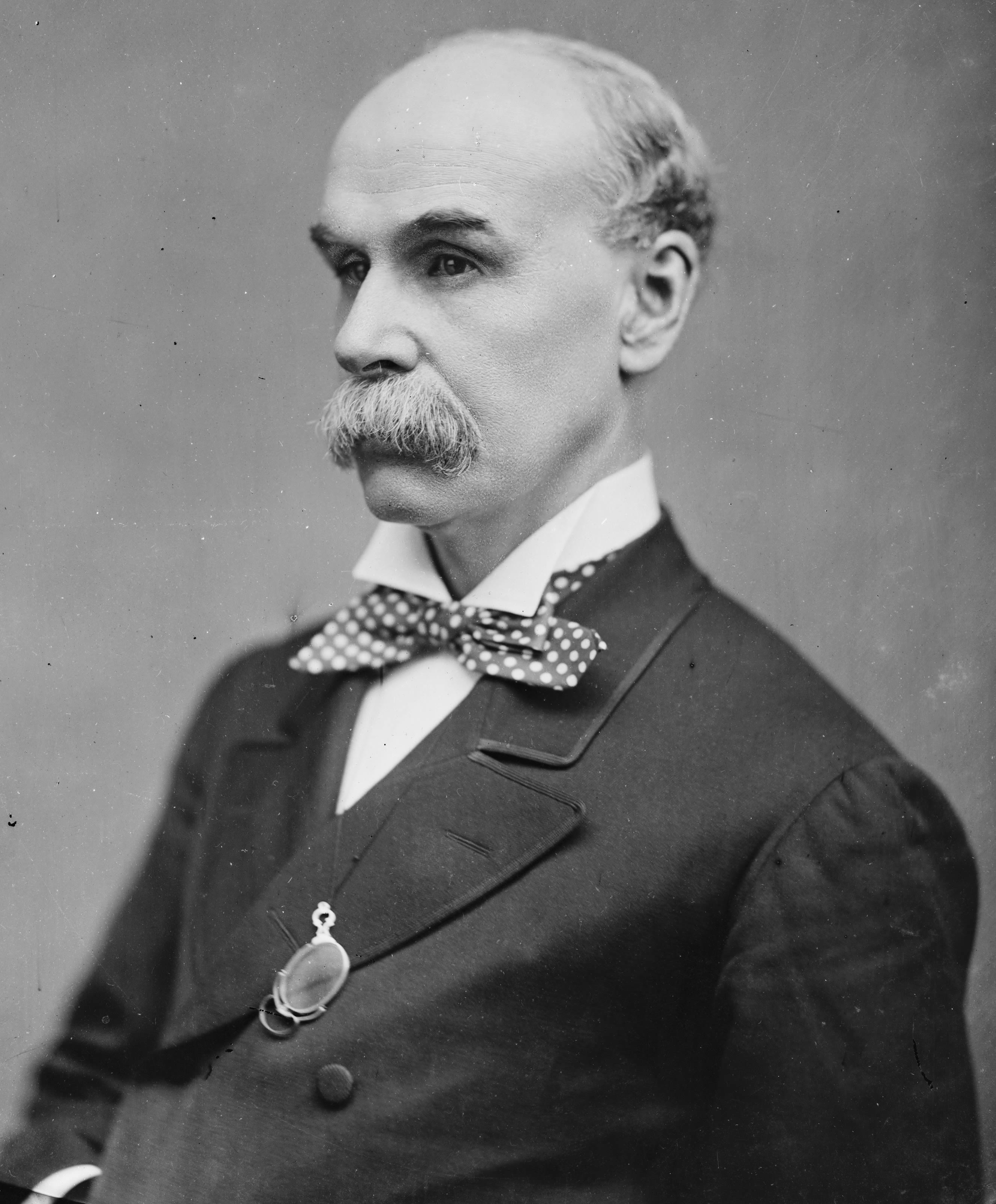
Candidate	William Pinkney Whyte
Party	Democratic
Legislative vote	-
Percentage	-%

William Pinkney Whyte won election for an unknown margin of votes for the Class 1 seat.

== New York ==
The New York election was held on January 19 and 20, 1875, by the New York State Legislature.

Republican Reuben E. Fenton had been elected in January 1869 to this seat, and his term would expire on March 3, 1875.

At the state election in November 1873, a Republican majority was elected for a two-year term (1874–1875) in the State Senate. At the State election in November 1874, Democrat Samuel J. Tilden was elected Governor, 75 Democrats and 53 Republicans were elected for the session of 1875 to the Assembly, and Democrat Albert P. Laning was elected in the 31st District to fill a vacancy in the State Senate. The 98th New York State Legislature met from January 5 to May 19, 1875, at Albany, New York.

The caucus of Democratic State legislators met on January 15, State Senator Albert P. Laning, of Buffalo, presided. All but one of the legislators were present, only Assemblyman John M. Roscoe, of Schoharie County, was sick. The caucus nominated Francis Kernan for the U.S. Senate. Kernan had been the Democratic/Liberal Republican candidate for Governor in November 1872 but had been defeated by John Adams Dix. Now Kernan was the choice of Tammany boss John Kelly who had succeeded the corrupt William M. Tweed. Kelly was opposed by John C. Jacobs, who proposed Ex-State Senator Henry C. Murphy, Jacobs's predecessor from the 3rd District, and the Democratic candidate who had lost the U.S. Senate elections in 1867 and 1869 when the Democrats were the minority. Kelly stood firm in his intention to dominate the Democratic Party, and had the caucus nomination made by viva voce vote instead of the more traditional secret ballot. Jacobs and Murphy had expected to get votes from many legislators who would not dare to cross Kelly openly, but had to abandon their hopes when the secret ballot was voted down 74 to 13.

Democratic caucus
Candidate	First ballot
Francis Kernan	77
Henry C. Murphy	9
John T. Hoffman	1

The caucus of the Republican State legislators nominated Ex-U.S. Senator from New York Edwin D. Morgan.

On January 19, the Democratic majority of the Assembly nominated Francis Kernan, and the Republican majority of the State Senate nominated Ex-U.S. Senator Edwin D. Morgan. On January 20, both Houses met in joint session to compare nominations, and finding that they disagreed, proceeded to a joint ballot. Francis Kernan was elected, the first Democratic U.S. Senator from New York since 1851 when Daniel S. Dickinson left office.

House	Democratic		Republican		Democratic	
State Senate (32 members)	Francis Kernan	13	Edwin D. Morgan	16		
State Assembly (128 members)	Francis Kernan	74	Edwin D. Morgan	52	John T. Hoffman	1
Joint Ballot (160 members)	Francis Kernan	87	Edwin D. Morgan	68	John T. Hoffman	1

Note: The vote for Ex-Governor of New York Hoffman was cast by Reuben E. Fenton's brother-in-law Samuel Scudder, a Democratic Assemblyman from Cattaraugus County.

== Pennsylvania ==
The Pennsylvania election was held on January 19, 1875. The Pennsylvania General Assembly, consisting of the House of Representatives and the Senate, elected William A. Wallace.

State Legislature Results
Party	Candidate	Votes	%
Democratic	William A. Wallace	125	49.80
Republican	John Allison	116	46.22
N/A	Not voting	10	3.98
Totals		251	100.00%

== West Virginia ==
1875 United States Senate election in West Virginia
- January 26–February 17, 1875

Needed to win: Majority of votes cast jointly by the Legislature
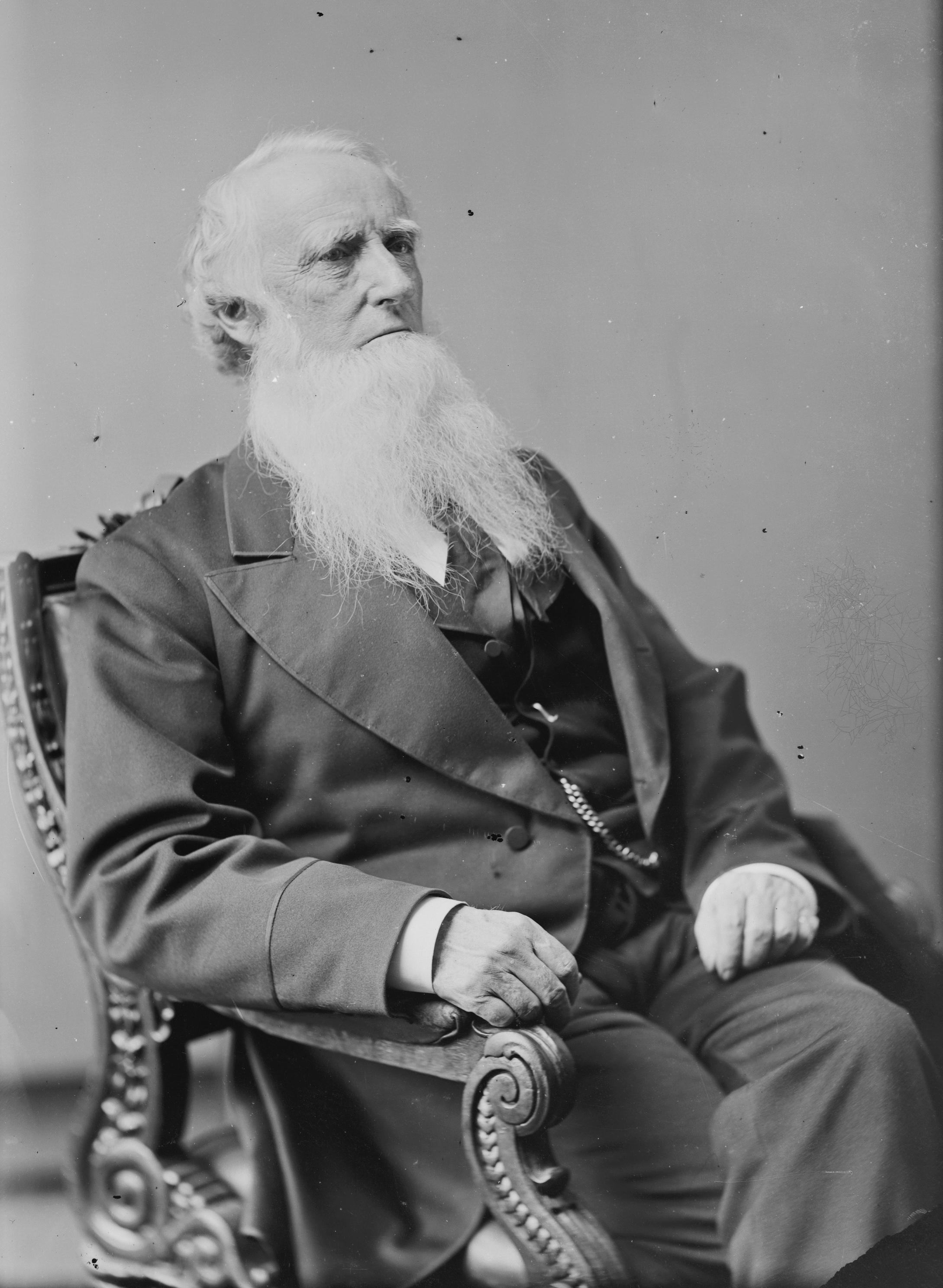
Candidate	Allen Caperton
Party	Democratic
First ballot	6 votes 6.9%
23rd ballot	68 votes 80.9%
U.S. senator before election
Arthur Boreman
Republican
Elected U.S. Senator
Allen Caperton
Democratic

On January 26, 1875, each house of the West Virginia Legislature held votes to elect a Senator, with no person receiving the majority of votes in either chamber. Pursuant to the 1866 Act regulating the election of senators (S.414), the legislature convened into a joint assembly the following day and held further voting. After 23 ballots held jointly, Allen T. Caperton received the majority of votes on February 17, 1875, and was declared duly elected as senator. Votes for senator across the 23 rounds were mostly scattered, with Caperton, the eventual winner, only starting out with 6 votes in the first joint ballot, and receiving only 30 (13 votes short) on the round before his victory.

Prior to the election, Johnson Camden and Henry S. Walker were seen as the foremost contenders for the Democratic nomination, which, because of Democrats' large majorities in both houses, was tantamount to election under normal circumstances. However, after repeated failures of any candidate to win a majority either in internal caucus votes or on the floor, legislative Democrats turned to finding a compromise candidate, settling on former Confederate senator Allen T. Caperton. Republican votes were similarly split on most ballots, though on the final one, they supported former Appeals Court chief justice and state senator Ralph Berkshire nearly unanimously.

House and Senate ballots
Party	Candidate	House		Senate	
Party	Candidate	Votes	%	Votes	%
Democratic	Jonathan M. Bennett	0	0.0	1	4.2
Democratic	John Brannon	10	15.6	3	12.5
Democratic	Gideon D. Camden	0	0.0	3	12.5
Democratic	Johnson N. Camden	17	26.6	2	8.3
Republican	Archibald Campbell	1	1.6	0	0.0
Democratic	Allen T. Caperton	6	9.4	1	4.2
Democratic	John Cunningham	5	7.8	0	0.0
Democratic	Charles J. Faulkner	1	1.6	0	0.0
Republican	Nathan Goff Jr.	2	3.1	1	4.2
Democratic	Daniel D. Johnson	0	0.0	1	4.2
Democratic	Okey Johnson	1	1.6	1	4.2
Democratic	Samuel Price	10	15.6	3	12.5
Republican	George C. Sturgiss	0	0.0	1	4.2
Republican	Thomas B. Swann	0	0.0	1	4.2
Democratic	Henry S. Walker	11	17.2	6	25.0
Total		64	100	24	100
Needed to win		33	>50	13	>50

Joint Session
Party	Candidate	Ballots																						
Party	Candidate	1	2	3	4	5	6	7	8	9	10	11	12	13	14	15	16	17	18	19	20	21	22	23
Democratic	Allen T. Caperton	6	3	1	1	1	2	0	1	1	1	3	7	13	0	1	2	1	1	0	0	3	30	68
Democratic	Jonathan M. Bennett	0	0	0	0	1	1	0	1	2	16	21	0	0	0	0	0	0	0	0	0	0	0	0
Republican	Ralph Berkshire	1	0	3	2	0	0	0	0	0	0	2	0	0	0	0	0	0	0	0	0	0	2	14
Democratic	John Brannon	11	14	12	10	16	12	13	10	14	5	1	0	0	6	5	1	3	0	0	0	0	0	0
Democratic	Gideon D. Camden	2	1	0	0	0	0	6	4	1	1	1	35	25	0	0	0	0	0	0	0	0	0	0
Democratic	Johnson N. Camden	19	27	15	24	20	22	0	0	0	0	0	0	0	27	28	31	27	2	0	0	0	0	0
Democratic	Robert Dennis	0	0	0	0	0	0	0	0	0	0	0	0	0	0	0	0	0	0	0	26	17	0	0
Democratic	Ira J. McGinnis	0	0	0	0	0	0	0	0	0	0	2	0	0	0	0	0	0	1	0	29	36	0	0
Democratic	John J. Jackson Sr.	0	0	0	0	0	0	0	0	0	0	0	0	0	0	0	0	2	32	26	0	0	0	0
Democratic	Okey Johnson	2	2	0	1	0	0	8	20	27	20	13	7	3	6	0	0	0	0	0	0	0	0	0
Democratic	Samuel Price	12	10	15	11	12	13	15	12	15	9	16	0	0	13	19	18	18	20	17	12	14	17	0
Democratic	Henry S. Walker	19	20	23	22	21	20	22	23	22	22	21	25	25	22	21	23	24	23	23	0	0	0	0
Other candidates		15	10	17	14	14	17	22	16	4	11	4	11	18	13	13	10	10	6	17	17	14	35	2
Total		87	87	86	85	85	87	86	87	86	85	84	85	84	87	87	85	85	85	83	84	84	84	84
Needed to win		44	44	44	43	43	44	44	44	44	43	43	43	43	44	44	43	43	43	42	43	43	43	43

== See also ==
- 1874 United States elections
  - 1874–75 United States House of Representatives elections
- 43rd United States Congress
- 44th United States Congress
