= 1868–69 United States Senate elections =

- Dates vary by state (And other dates for special elections)
- Class 1

25 of the 66 (8 vacant)/74 seats in the United States Senate (with special elections) 34 seats needed for a majority
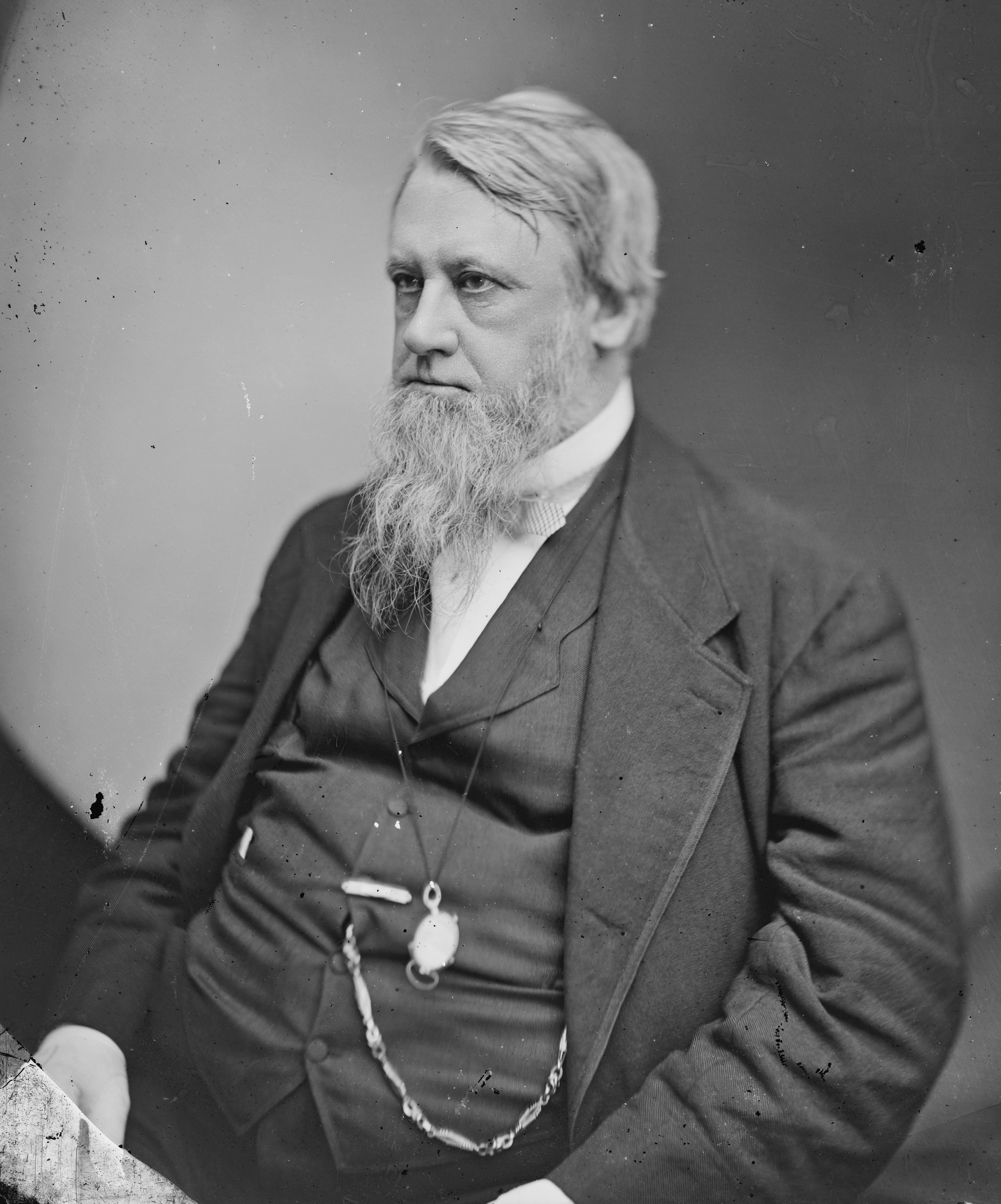

	Majority party	Minority party
Leader	Henry B. Anthony (Note: as Republican Conference Chair)
Party	Republican	Democratic
Leader since	March 4, 1863
Leader's seat	Rhode Island
Last election	39 seats	10 seats
Seats before	57	9
Seats won	17	5
Seats after	57	9
Seat change	Steady	Steady
Seats up	17	5
- Results of the elections: Democratic gain Democratic hold Republican gain Republican hold Unreconstructed states
Majority Party before election
Republican
Elected Majority Party
Republican

The 1868–69 United States Senate elections were held on various dates in various states. As these U.S. Senate elections were prior to the ratification of the Seventeenth Amendment in 1913, senators were chosen by state legislatures. Senators were elected over a wide range of time throughout 1868 and 1869, and a seat may have been filled months late or remained vacant due to legislative deadlock. In these elections, terms were up for the senators in Class 1.

The Republican Party maintained their Senate majority. Six former Confederate states were then readmitted separately from the regular election, each electing two Republicans. This increased the Republicans' already overwhelming majority to the largest proportion of seats ever controlled by the party.

== Results summary ==
Senate party division, 41st Congress (1869–1871)

- Majority party: Republican (57)
- Minority party: Democratic (9)
- Other parties: (0)
- Vacant: (8)
- Total seats: 74

== Change in Senate composition ==
=== Beginning of 1868 ===
D_{3}	D_{2}	D_{1}	V_{4}	V_{3}	V_{2}	V_{1}			
D_{4}	D_{5}	D_{6}	D_{7}	D_{8}	V_{5} Readmitted	V_{6} Readmitted	V_{7} Readmitted	V_{8} Readmitted	V_{9} Readmitted
R_{44}	R_{45}	V_{17} Readmitted	V_{16} Readmitted	V_{15} Readmitted	V_{14} Readmitted	V_{13} Readmitted	V_{12} Readmitted	V_{11} Special	V_{10} Readmitted
R_{43}	R_{42}	R_{41}	R_{40}	R_{39}	R_{38}	R_{37}	R_{36}	R_{35}	R_{34}
Majority →									R_{33}
R_{24}	R_{25}	R_{26}	R_{27}	R_{28}	R_{29}	R_{30}	R_{31}	R_{32}	R_{33}
R_{23}	R_{22}	R_{21}	R_{20}	R_{19}	R_{18}	R_{17}	R_{16}	R_{15}	R_{14}
R_{4}	R_{5}	R_{6}	R_{7}	R_{8}	R_{9}	R_{10}	R_{11}	R_{12}	R_{13}
R_{3}	R_{2}	R_{1}	V_{18}	V_{19}	V_{20}	V_{21}			

=== After the readmission of the Confederate states ===
D_{3}	D_{2}	D_{1}	V_{4}	V_{3}	V_{2}	V_{1}			
D_{4}	D_{5}	D_{6}	D_{7}	D_{8}	D_{9} Gain	R_{57} Gain	R_{56} Gain	R_{55} Gain	R_{54} Gain
R_{44}	R_{45}	R_{46} Gain	R_{47} Gain	R_{48} Gain	R_{49} Gain	R_{50} Gain	R_{51} Gain	R_{52} Gain	R_{53} Gain
R_{43}	R_{42}	R_{41}	R_{40}	R_{39}	R_{38}	R_{37}	R_{36}	R_{35}	R_{34}
Majority →									R_{34}
R_{24}	R_{25}	R_{26}	R_{27}	R_{28}	R_{29}	R_{30}	R_{31}	R_{32}	R_{33}
R_{23}	R_{22}	R_{21}	R_{20}	R_{19}	R_{18}	R_{17}	R_{16}	R_{15}	R_{14}
R_{4}	R_{5}	R_{6}	R_{7}	R_{8}	R_{9}	R_{10}	R_{11}	R_{12}	R_{13}
R_{3}	R_{2}	R_{1}	V_{5}	V_{6}	V_{7}	V_{8}			

=== Before the elections ===
After July 16, 1868, readmission of South Carolina.

D_{3}	D_{2}	D_{1}	V_{4} Seceded	V_{3} Seceded	V_{2} Seceded	V_{1}			
D_{4}	D_{5} Unknown	D_{6} Retired	D_{7} Retired	D_{8} Retired	D_{9} Retired	R_{57} Retired	R_{56} Retired	R_{55} Unknown	R_{54} Unknown
R_{44} Ran	R_{45} Ran	R_{46} Ran	R_{47} Ran	R_{48} Ran	R_{49} Ran	R_{50} Ran	R_{51} Ran	R_{52} Ran	R_{53} Unknown
R_{43} Ran	R_{42} Ran	R_{41} Ran	R_{40}	R_{39}	R_{38}	R_{37}	R_{36}	R_{35}	R_{34}
Majority →									R_{34}
R_{24}	R_{25}	R_{26}	R_{27}	R_{28}	R_{29}	R_{30}	R_{31}	R_{32}	R_{33}
R_{23}	R_{22}	R_{21}	R_{20}	R_{19}	R_{18}	R_{17}	R_{16}	R_{15}	R_{14}
R_{4}	R_{5}	R_{6}	R_{7}	R_{8}	R_{9}	R_{10}	R_{11}	R_{12}	R_{13}
R_{3}	R_{2}	R_{1}	V_{5}	V_{6}	V_{7}	V_{8}			

=== Result of the elections ===
D_{3}	D_{2}	D_{1}	V_{4} Seceded	V_{3} Seceded	V_{2} Seceded	V_{1}			
D_{4}	D_{5} Hold	D_{6} Hold	D_{7} Gain	D_{8} Gain	D_{9} Gain	R_{57} Gain	R_{56} Gain	R_{55} Gain	R_{54} Hold
R_{44} Re-elected	R_{45} Re-elected	R_{46} Re-elected	R_{47} Re-elected	R_{48} Hold	R_{49} Hold	R_{50} Hold	R_{51} Hold	R_{52} Hold	R_{53} Hold
R_{43} Re-elected	R_{42} Re-elected	R_{41} Re-elected	R_{40}	R_{39}	R_{38}	R_{37}	R_{36}	R_{35}	R_{34}
Majority →									R_{34}
R_{24}	R_{25}	R_{26}	R_{27}	R_{28}	R_{29}	R_{30}	R_{31}	R_{32}	R_{33}
R_{23}	R_{22}	R_{21}	R_{20}	R_{19}	R_{18}	R_{17}	R_{16}	R_{15}	R_{14}
R_{4}	R_{5}	R_{6}	R_{7}	R_{8}	R_{9}	R_{10}	R_{11}	R_{12}	R_{13}
R_{3}	R_{2}	R_{1}	V_{5}	V_{6}	V_{7}	V_{8}			

Key:

D_{#}	Democratic
R_{#}	Republican
V_{#}	Vacant

== Race summaries ==
=== Elections during the 40th Congress ===
In these elections, the winners were seated during 1868 or in 1869 before March 4; ordered by election date.

State	Incumbent			Results	Candidates
State	Senator	Party	Electoral history	Results	Candidates
Kentucky (Class 2)	James Guthrie	Democratic	1864	Incumbent resigned due to failing health. New senator elected February 18, 1868. Democratic hold.	▌ ✓ Thomas C. McCreery (Democratic) 110; ▌ S. M. Barnes (Republican) 9; ▌ Aaron Harding (Conservative) 5
Maryland (Class 3)	Vacant since March 3, 1867, when Senator-elect Philip F. Thomas failed to qualify.			New senator elected March 7, 1868. Democratic gain.	▌ ✓ George Vickers (Democratic); [data missing]
Florida (Class 1)	Vacant since January 21, 1861, when Stephen Mallory (D) withdrew.			State readmitted to the Union. New senator elected June 17, 1868. Republican gain. Winner did not run for election to the next term; see below.	▌ ✓ Adonijah Welch (Republican); [data missing]
Arkansas (Class 2)	Vacant since July 11, 1861, when William K. Sebastian (D) was expelled.			State readmitted to the Union. New senator elected June 22, 1868. Republican gain.	▌ ✓ Alexander McDonald (Republican); [data missing]
Arkansas (Class 3)	Vacant since July 11, 1861, when Charles B. Mitchel (D) was expelled.			State readmitted to the Union. New senator elected June 23, 1868. Republican gain.	▌ ✓ Benjamin F. Rice (Republican); [data missing]
Florida (Class 3)	Vacant since January 21, 1861, when David Levy Yulee (D) withdrew.			State readmitted to the Union. New senator elected June 25, 1868. Republican gain.	▌ ✓ Thomas W. Osborn (Republican); [data missing]
Louisiana (Class 2)	Vacant since February 4, 1861, when Judah P. Benjamin (D) withdrew.			State readmitted to the Union. New senator elected July 8, 1868. Republican gain.	▌ ✓ John S. Harris (Republican); [data missing]
Louisiana (Class 3)	Vacant since February 4, 1861, when John Slidell (D) resigned.			State readmitted to the Union. New senator elected July 9, 1868. Republican gain.	▌ ✓ William P. Kellogg (Republican); [data missing]
Alabama (Class 2)	Vacant since January 21, 1861, when Clement Claiborne Clay (D) withdrew.			State readmitted to the Union. New senator elected July 13, 1868. Republican gain.	▌ ✓ Willard Warner (Republican); [data missing]
Alabama (Class 3)	Vacant since January 21, 1861, when Benjamin Fitzpatrick (D) withdrew.			State readmitted to the Union. New senator elected July 13, 1868. Republican gain.	▌ ✓ George E. Spencer (Republican); [data missing]
North Carolina (Class 2)	Vacant since March 6, 1861, when Thomas Bragg (D) resigned.			State readmitted to the Union. New senator elected July 14, 1868. Republican gain.	▌ ✓ Joseph Abbott (Republican); [data missing]
North Carolina (Class 3)	Vacant since March 11, 1861, when Thomas Clingman (D) resigned.			State readmitted to the Union. New senator elected July 14, 1868. Republican gain.	▌ ✓ John Pool (Republican); [data missing]
South Carolina (Class 2)	Vacant since November 10, 1860, when James Chesnut Jr. (D) withdrew.			State readmitted to the Union. New senator elected July 15, 1868. Republican gain.	▌ ✓ Thomas J. Robertson (Republican); [data missing]
South Carolina (Class 3)	Vacant since November 11, 1860, when James Henry Hammond (D) withdrew.			State readmitted to the Union. New senator elected July 16, 1868. Republican gain.	▌ ✓ Frederick A. Sawyer (Republican); [data missing]
Delaware (Class 1)	James A. Bayard Jr.	Democratic	1851; 1857; 1863; 1864 (resigned); 1867 (appointed)	Interim appointee elected January 19, 1869 to finish the term. Winner did not run for election to the next term; see below.	▌ ✓ James A. Bayard Jr. (Democratic); [data missing]

=== Races leading to the 41st Congress ===
In these regular elections, the winners were elected for the term beginning March 4, 1869; ordered by state.

All of the elections involved the Class 1 seats.

State	Incumbent			Results	Candidates
State	Senator	Party	Electoral history	Results	Candidates
California	John Conness	Republican	1862–63	Incumbent lost re-election or retired. New senator elected in 1868. Democratic gain.	▌ ✓ Eugene Casserly (Democratic) [data missing]
Connecticut	James Dixon	Republican	1856; 1863	Incumbent lost re-election. New senator elected on May 19, 1868. Republican hold.	▌ ✓ William Buckingham (Republican) 124 H/12 S ▌ James Dixon (Republican) 109 H/9 S
Delaware	James A. Bayard Jr.	Democratic	1851; 1857; 1863; 1864 (resigned); 1867 (appointed); 1869 (special)	Incumbent retired. New senator elected in 1869. Democratic hold.	▌ ✓ Thomas F. Bayard Sr. (Democratic) [data missing]
Florida	Adonijah Welch	Republican	1868 (special)	Incumbent retired. New senator elected in 1868 or 1869. Republican hold.	▌ ✓ Abijah Gilbert (Republican) [data missing]
Indiana	Thomas A. Hendricks	Democratic	1862	Incumbent retired. New senator elected in 1868. Republican gain.	▌ ✓ Daniel D. Pratt (Republican) [data missing]
Maine	Lot Myrick Morrill	Republican	1861 (r.); 1863	Incumbent lost re-election. New senator elected. Republican hold.	First ballot (January 19, 1869): ▌ ✓ Hannibal Hamlin Sr. (Republican) 118 H; 28 S; ▌Albert Palmer Gould Sr. (Democratic) 30 H; 2 S; ▌Joshua Lawrence Chamberlain Jr. (Republican) 1 H; 0 S; ▌Lot Myrick Morrill (Republican) 1 H; 0 S; ▌Absent 1 H; 0 S
Maryland	William P. Whyte	Democratic	1868 (appointed)	Incumbent retired. New senator elected in 1868 or 1869. Democratic hold.	▌ ✓ William T. Hamilton (Democratic) [data missing]
Massachusetts	Charles Sumner	Republican	1851 (special); 1857; 1863	Incumbent re-elected in 1869.	▌ ✓ Charles Sumner (Republican) [data missing]
Michigan	Zachariah Chandler	Republican	1857; 1863	Incumbent re-elected in 1869.	▌ ✓ Zachariah Chandler (Republican) [data missing]
Minnesota	Alexander Ramsey	Republican	1863	Incumbent re-elected in 1869.	▌ ✓ Alexander Ramsey (Republican) 52 (80%); ▌Charles W. Nash (Democratic) 13 (20%)
Mississippi	Vacant since January 21, 1861, when Jefferson Davis (D) resigned.			Legislature failed to elect during Civil War and Reconstruction. Seat remained vacant until 1870.	None.
Missouri	John B. Henderson	Republican	1862 (appointed); 1862	Incumbent retired. New senator elected in 1868. Republican hold.	▌ ✓ Carl Schurz (Republican) [data missing]
Nebraska	Thomas Tipton	Republican	1867	Incumbent re-elected in 1869.	▌ ✓ Thomas Tipton (Republican) [data missing]
Nevada	William M. Stewart	Republican	1865	Incumbent re-elected in 1869.	▌ ✓ William M. Stewart (Republican) [data missing]
New Jersey	Frederick T. Frelinghuysen	Republican	1866 (appointed); 1867 (special)	Incumbent lost re-election. New senator elected in 1869. Democratic gain.	▌ ✓ John P. Stockton (Democratic) 42; ▌Frederick T. Frelinghuysen (Republican) 34; [data missing]
New York	Edwin D. Morgan	Republican	1863	Incumbent lost renomination. New senator elected January 19, 1869. Republican hold.	▌ ✓ Reuben E. Fenton (Republican); ▌Henry C. Murphy (Democratic); ▌Henry S. Randall (Democratic)
Ohio	Benjamin Wade	Republican	1851; 1856; 1863	Incumbent lost renomination. New senator elected in 1868. Democratic gain.	▌ ✓ Allen G. Thurman (Democratic) [data missing]
Pennsylvania	Charles R. Buckalew	Democratic	1863	Incumbent lost re-election or retired. New senator elected January 19, 1869. Republican gain.	▌ ✓ John Scott (Republican) 58.65%; ▌William A. Wallace (Democratic) 38.35%; ▌Hiester Clymer (Democratic) 0.75%
Rhode Island	William Sprague IV	Republican	1862	Incumbent re-elected in 1868.	▌ ✓ William Sprague IV (Republican) [data missing]
Tennessee	David T. Patterson	Democratic	1866 (readmission)	Incumbent retired. New senator elected early on October 22, 1867, for the term beginning March 4, 1869. Republican gain.	▌ ✓ William G. Brownlow (Republican) 63; ▌William B. Stokes (Republican) 39
Texas	Vacant since March 23, 1861, when Louis Wigfall (D) withdrew.			Legislature failed to elect during Civil War and Reconstruction. Seat remained vacant until 1870.	None.
Vermont	George F. Edmunds	Republican	1866 (appointed); 1866 (special)	Incumbent re-elected in 1868.	▌ ✓ George F. Edmunds (Republican) [data missing]
Virginia	Vacant since January 2, 1864, when Joseph Segar (U) was not seated.			Legislature failed to elect during Civil War and Reconstruction. Seat remained vacant until 1870.	None.
West Virginia	Peter G. Van Winkle	Republican	1863	Incumbent lost re-election or retired. New senator elected in 1869. Republican hold.	▌ ✓ Arthur I. Boreman (Republican) 43(H), 19(S) ▌Daniel Lamb (Republican) 10(H), 3(S)
Wisconsin	James R. Doolittle	Republican	1857; 1863	Incumbent retired. New senator elected January 27, 1869. Republican hold.	▌ ✓ Matthew H. Carpenter (Republican) 67.19%; ▌ George Baldwin Smith (Democratic) 32.03%; ▌ William Pitt Lynde (Democratic) 0.78%

=== Elections during the 41st Congress ===
There were no elections in 1869 during this Congress after March 4.

== Delaware ==
Interim appointed Senator James A. Bayard Jr. was elected January 19, 1869 to finish his term.

== Maryland ==
=== Maryland (special) ===
1868 United States Senate special election in Maryland
- 1868

80 members of the Maryland General Assembly
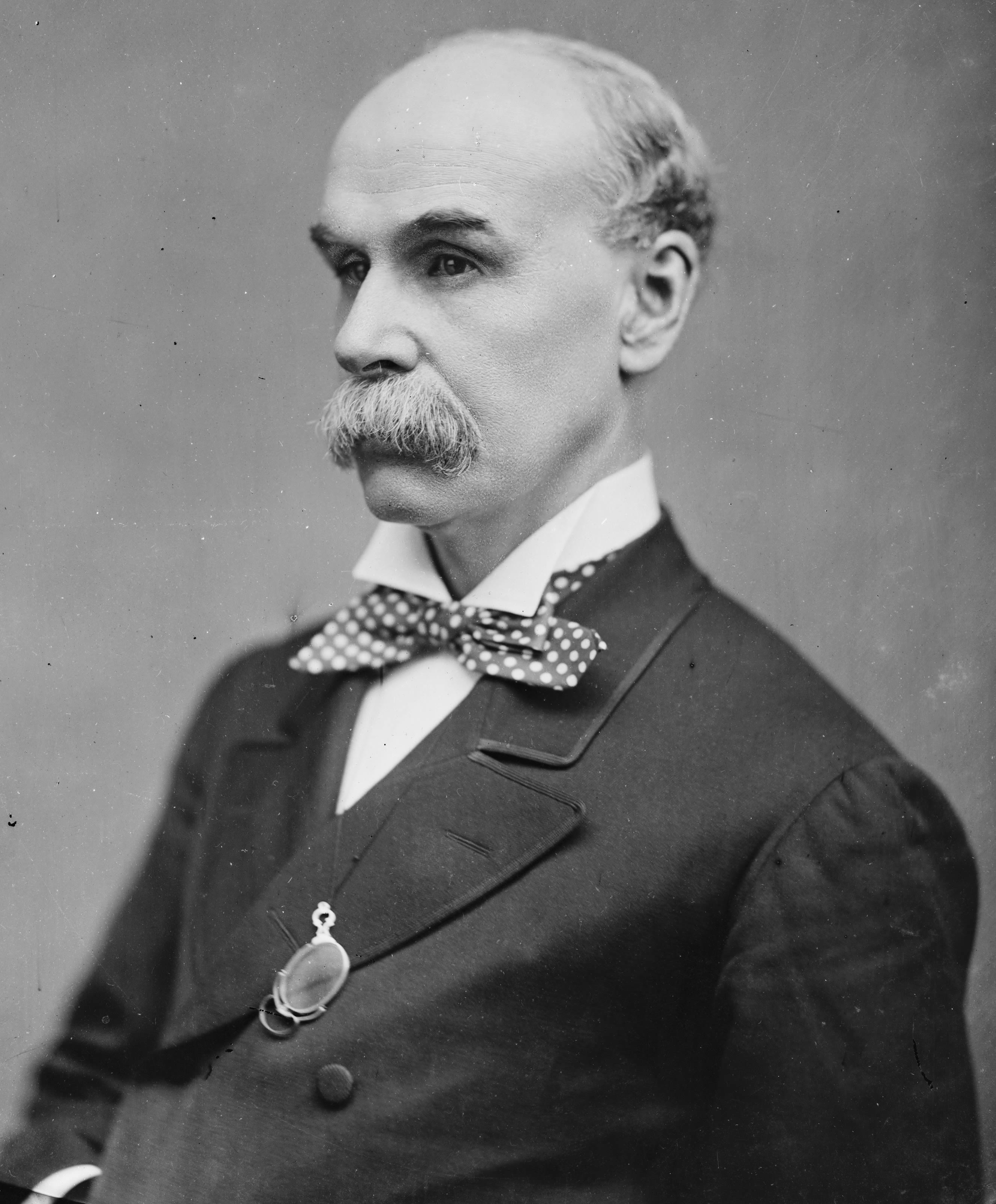
Candidate	William Pinkney Whyte
Party	Democratic
Legislative vote	-
Percentage	-%

William Pinkney Whyte won election by an unknown margin of votes, for the Class 1 seat to fill the vacancy created by Reverdy Johnson.

=== Maryland (regular) ===
1868 United States Senate election in Maryland
- 1868

80 members of the Maryland General Assembly
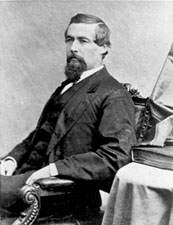

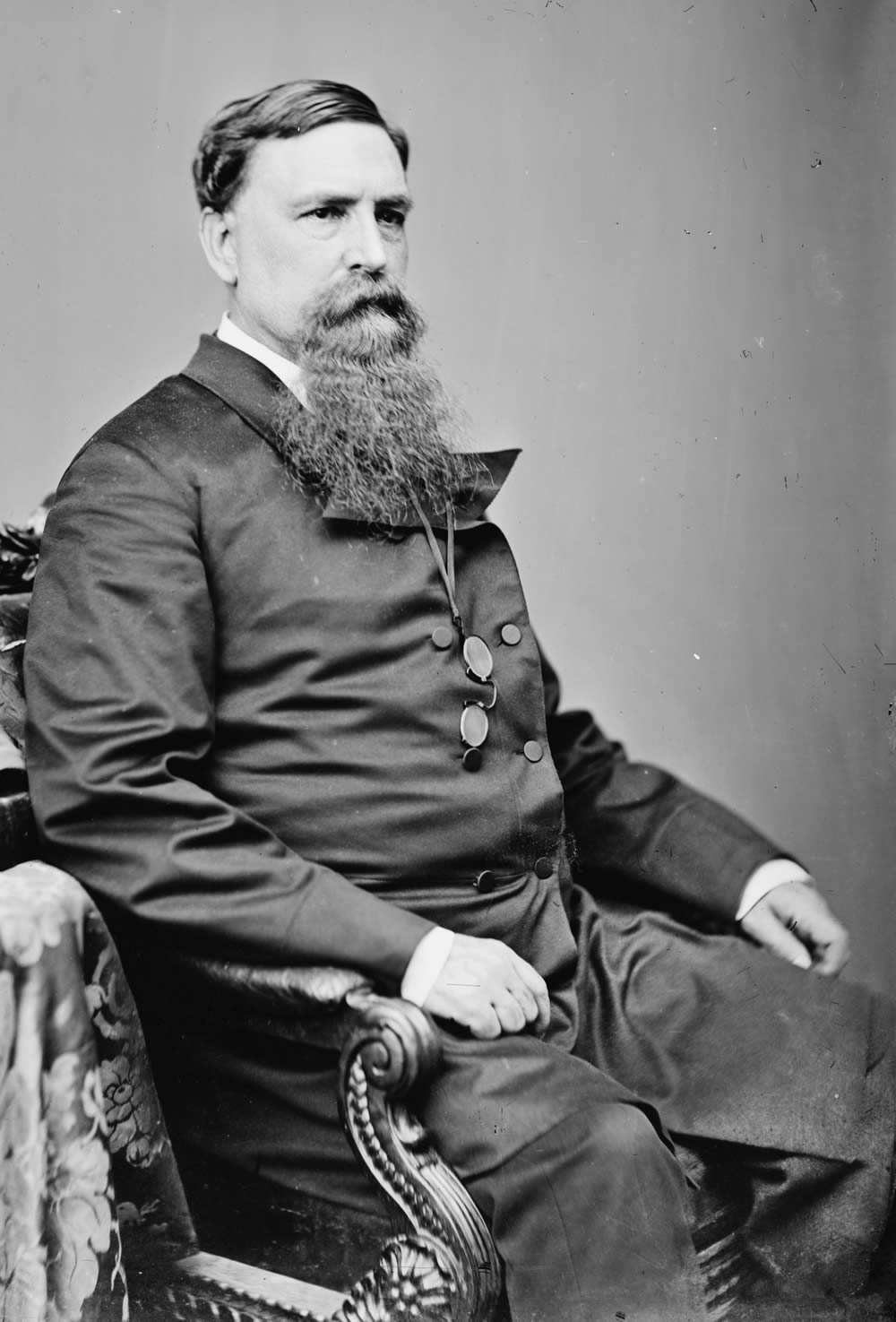
Candidate	William Thomas Hamilton	Thomas Swann
Party	Democratic	Democratic
Legislative vote	56	46
Percentage	50.91%	41.82

William Thomas Hamilton won election against Thomas Swann by a margin of 9.09%, or 10 votes for the Class 1 seat.

=== Maryland (March special) ===
1868 United States Senate special election in Maryland
- March 6, 1868

80 members of the Maryland General Assembly
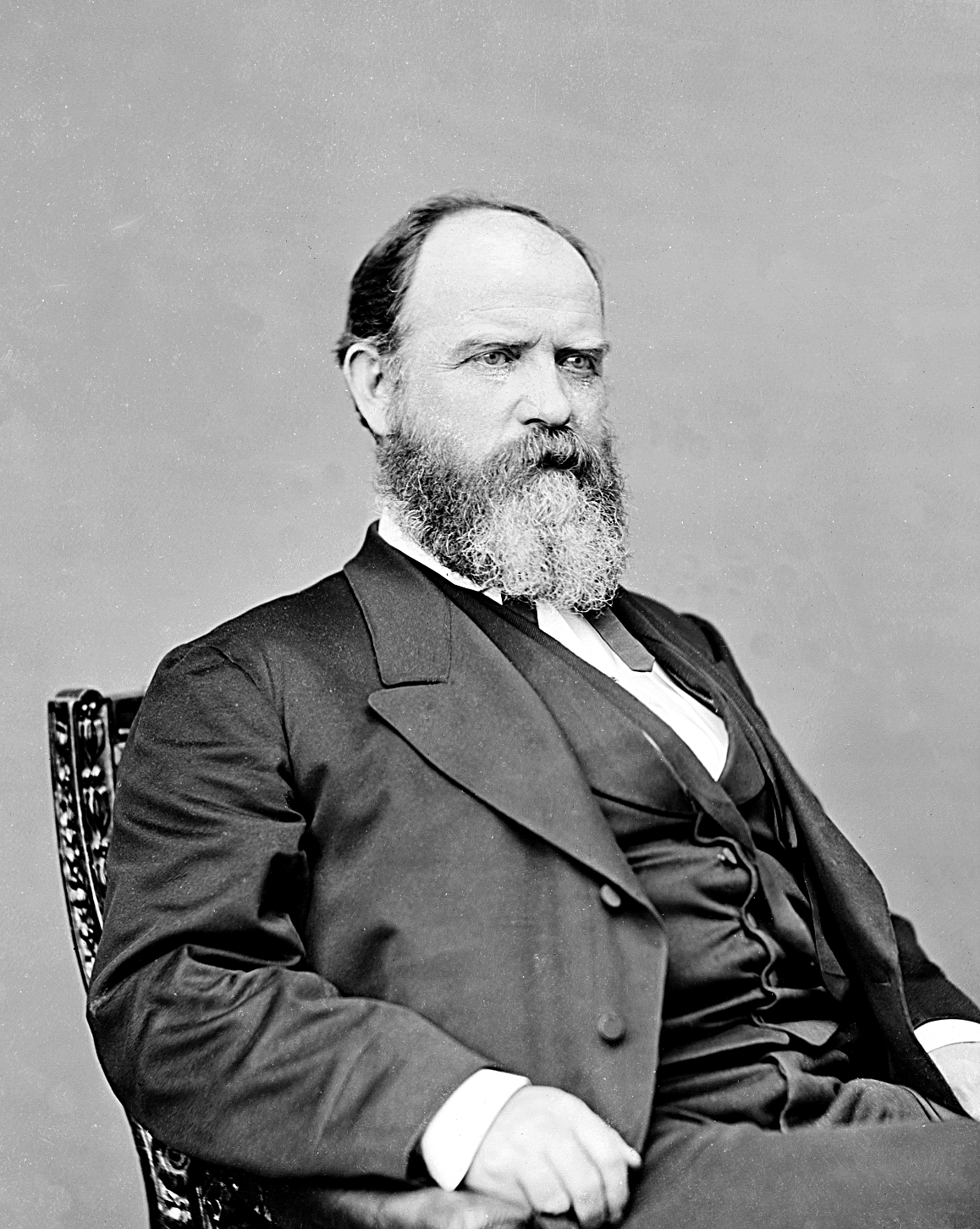

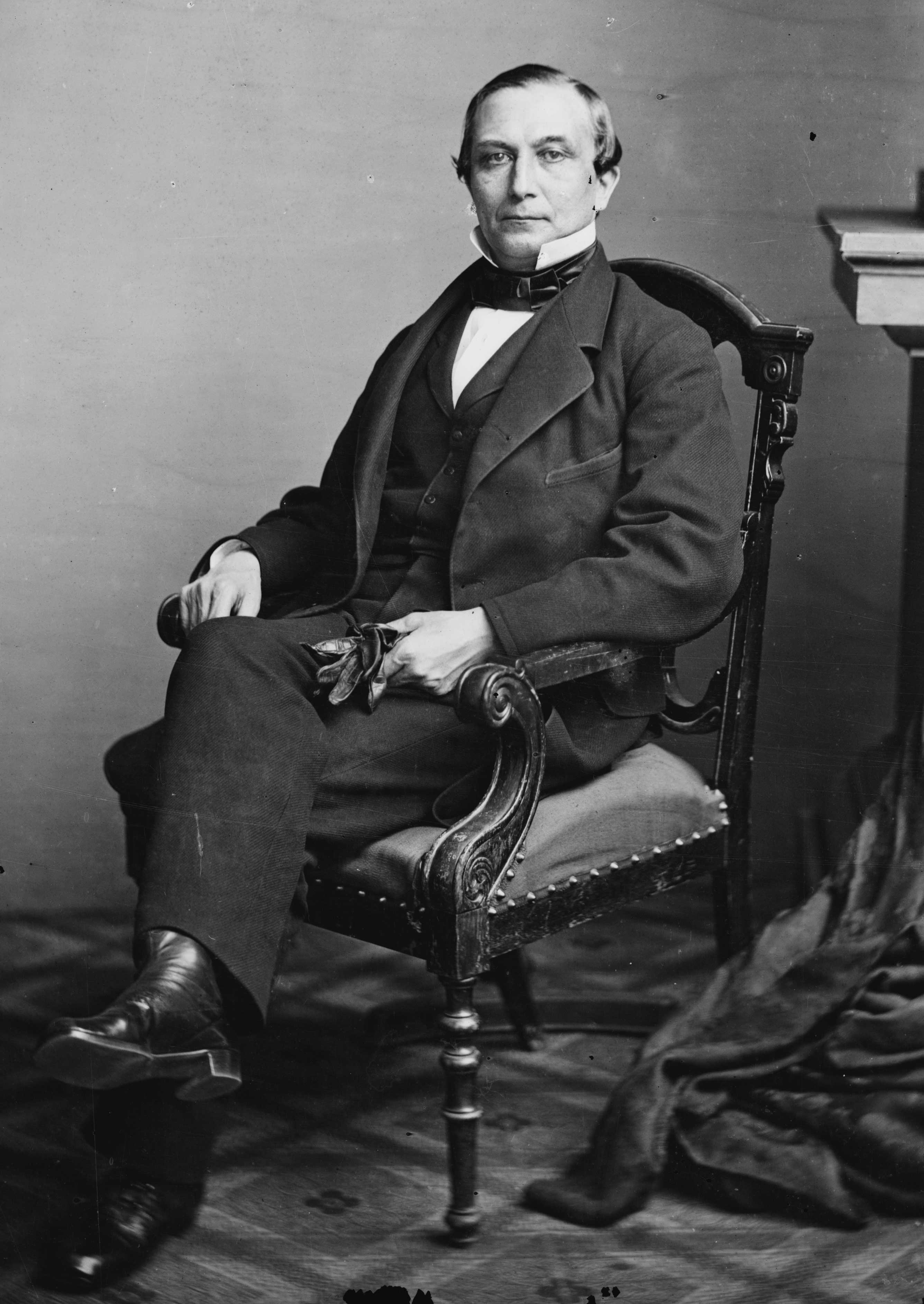
Candidate	John Creswell	Philip Francis Thomas
Party	Democratic	Democratic
Legislative vote	59	41
Percentage	57.84%	40.20%

Philip Francis Thomas, a Democrat, was elected in 1867, however, failed to qualify for the seat due to his support for the Confederacy. George Vickers was elected to finish the rest of the term by a margin of 17.65%, or 18 votes, for the Class 3 seat.

== Minnesota ==
The Minnesota U.S. Senate election was held by the state legislature on January 19, 1869, with each chamber voting separately. Republican Senator Alexander Ramsey received 16 of 21 votes in the state Senate and 36 of 44 in the state House. The legislature declared Ramsey the duly elected U.S. Senator in a joint convention on January 20, 1869. Democratic nominee Charles W. Nash was an attorney from Hastings, former state Senator for the 7th Senate District (1862–1864), and the Democratic nominee for lieutenant governor in 1865.

1869 Minnesota U.S. Senate election
Republican	Alexander Ramsey (inc.)	52	80.00
Democrat	Charles W. Nash	13	20.00

== New York ==
The election in New York was held on January 19, 1869, by the New York State Legislature. Republican Edwin D. Morgan had been elected in February 1863 to this seat, and his term would expire on March 3, 1869. At the State election in November 1867, 17 Republicans and 15 Democrats were elected for a two-year term (1868–1869) in the State Senate. At the State election in November 1868, Democrat John T. Hoffman was elected Governor, and 75 Republicans and 53 Democrats were elected for the session of 1869 to the Assembly. The 92nd New York State Legislature met from January 5 to May 11, 1869, at Albany, New York.

The caucus of Republican State legislators met on January 16, Assemblyman John H. Selkreg presided. All 92 legislators were present. They nominated Ex-Governor Reuben E. Fenton for the U.S. Senate. The incumbent U.S. Senator Edwin D. Morgan was very keen on his re-election, but was voted down. Speaker Truman G. Younglove had held back the appointments to the standing Assembly committees until after the caucus, and subsequent election, of a U.S. Senator, and was accused by the Morgan men to have made a bargain to favor the Fenton men with appointments after the election was accomplished. After the caucus, comparing notes, the assemblymen discovered that some of the most important committee chairmanships had been promised to a dozen different members by Speaker Younglove.

1869 Republican caucus for United States Senator result
Candidate	First ballot	Second ballot
Reuben E. Fenton	(50)	52
Edwin D. Morgan	(42)	40
blank	(1)	

Note: On the first ballot, 93 votes were cast, one too many, and it was annulled without announcing the result. The above stated result transpired unofficially. The blank vote caused some debate if the result was really invalidated by it, but it was finally agreed to take a second ballot.

The caucus of the Democratic State legislators met on January 18. State Senator Henry C. Murphy was again nominated, like in 1867.

In the Assembly, Republicans DeWitt C. Hoyt (Saratoga Co.) and James O. Schoonmaker (Ulster Co.); and Democrats James Irving (NYC), Lawrence D. Kiernan (NYC), Harris B. Howard (Rensselaer Co.), James B. Pearsall (Queens), John Tighe (Albany Co.) and Moses Y. Tilden (Columbia Co.); did not vote.

In the State Senate, Republicans Matthew Hale (16th D.) and Charles Stanford (15th D.); and Democrats Cauldwell, Thomas J. Creamer, Michael Norton (5th D.) and John J. Bradley (7th D.); did not vote.

Reuben E. Fenton was the choice of both the Assembly and the State Senate, and was declared elected.

1869 United States Senator election result
House	Republican		Democratic		Democratic	
State Senate (32 members)	Reuben E. Fenton	15	Henry C. Murphy	10	Henry S. Randall	1
State Assembly (128 members)	Reuben E. Fenton	73	Henry C. Murphy	46		

Notes:

- The vote for Ex-Secretary of State Randall was cast by Henry C. Murphy.
- The votes were cast on January 19, but both Houses met in a joint session on January 20 to compare nominations, and declare the result.

== Pennsylvania ==
The Pennsylvania election was held January 19, 1869. John Scott was elected by the Pennsylvania General Assembly. The Pennsylvania General Assembly, consisting of the House of Representatives and the Senate, convened on January 19, 1869, to elect a Senator to serve the term beginning on March 4, 1869. The results of the vote of both houses combined are as follows:

State Legislature Results
Party	Candidate	Votes	%
Republican	John Scott	78	58.65
Democratic	William A. Wallace	51	38.35
Democratic	Hiester Clymer	1	0.75
N/A	Not voting	3	2.26
Totals		133	100.00%

== West Virginia ==
1869 United States Senate election in West Virginia
- February 2, 1869

Needed to win: Majority of votes cast in each House of the Legislature 53 votes cast in the House; 27 votes needed 22 votes cast in the Senate; 12 votes needed
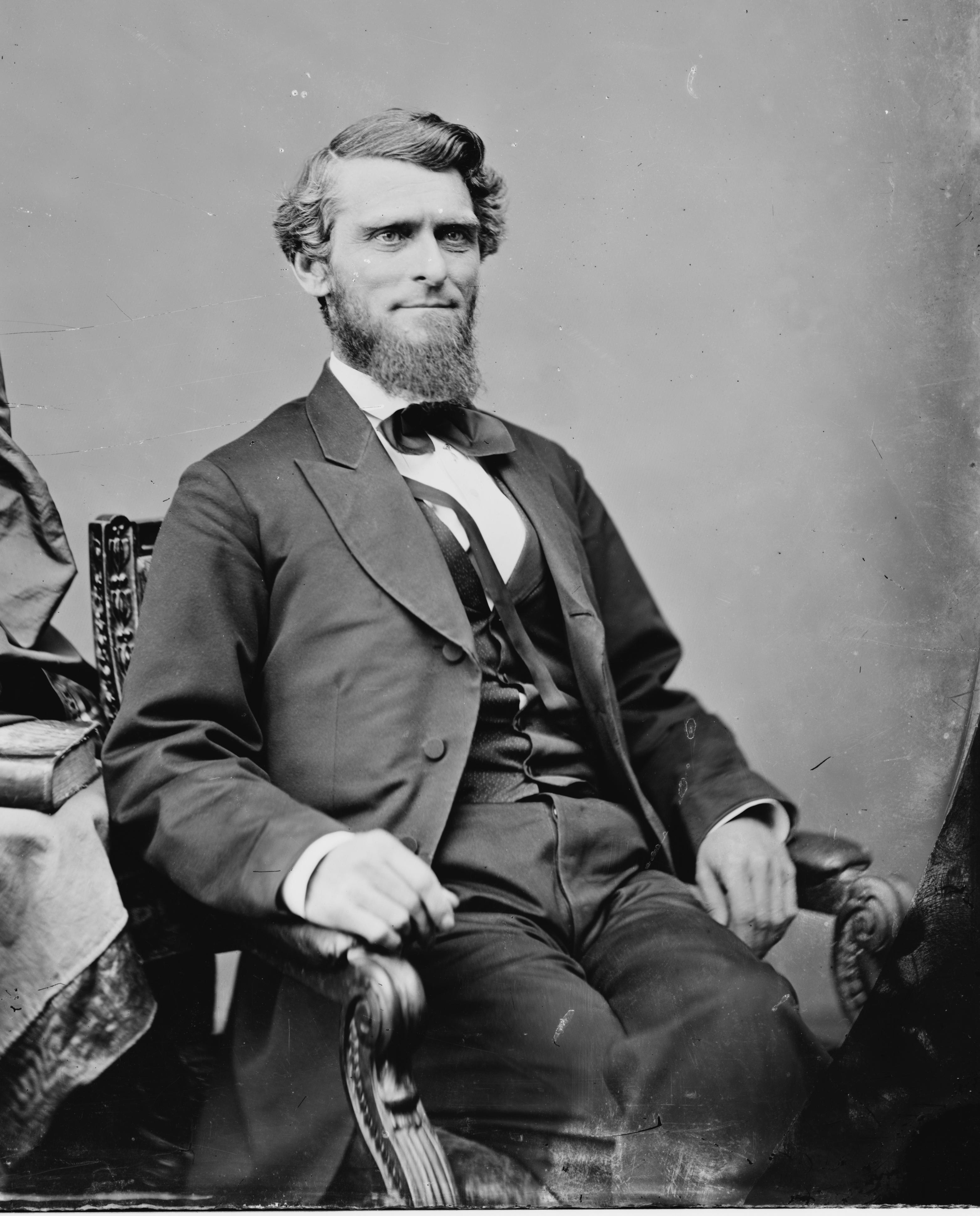

Candidate	Arthur Boreman	Daniel Lamb
Party	Republican	Democratic
House vote	43 votes 81.1%	10 votes 18.9%
Senate vote	19 votes 86.4%	3 votes 13.6%
U.S. senator before election
Peter Van Winkle
Republican
Elected U.S. Senator
Arthur Boreman
Republican

On February 2, 1869, the West Virginia Legislature held an election for senator to replace Peter Van Winkle. Nominated were Arthur Boreman, the first governor of West Virginia, and Daniel Lamb, a member of West Virginia's constitutional convention and former delegate. Boreman, having received majorities of the vote in both the House and Senate, was declared duly as elected senator on February 3, 1869.

Party	Candidate	House		Senate	
Party	Candidate	Votes	%	Votes	%
Republican	Arthur Boreman	43	81.1	19	86.4
Democratic	Daniel Lamb	10	18.9	3	13.6
Total		53	100	22	100
Needed to win		27	>50	12	>50

== See also ==
- 1868 United States elections
  - 1868 United States presidential election
  - 1868–69 United States House of Representatives elections
- 40th United States Congress
- 41st United States Congress
