= 1869 United States Senate election in Pennsylvania =

The 1869 United States Senate election in Pennsylvania was held on January 19, 1869. John Scott was elected by the Pennsylvania General Assembly to the United States Senate.

== Results ==
The Pennsylvania General Assembly, consisting of the House of Representatives and the Senate, convened on January 19, 1869, to elect a senator to serve the term beginning on March 4, 1869. The results of the vote of both houses combined are as follows:

State legislature results
Party	Candidate	Votes	%
Republican	John Scott	78	58.65
Democratic	William A. Wallace	51	38.35
Democratic	Hiester Clymer	1	0.75
N/A	Not voting	3	2.26
Totals		133	100.00%

== See also ==
- 1868–69 United States Senate elections

Preceded by 1863	Pennsylvania U.S. Senate election (Class I); 1869	Succeeded by 1875
