= 1881 United States Senate election in Pennsylvania =

The 1881 United States Senate election in Pennsylvania was held on thirty separate dates from January to February 1881. On February 23, 1881, John I. Mitchell was elected by the Pennsylvania General Assembly to the United States Senate.

== Results ==
The Pennsylvania General Assembly, consisting of the House of Representatives and the Senate, convened on January 27, 1881, to elect a senator to serve the term beginning on March 4, 1881.

Thirty-five ballots were recorded on thirty separate dates spanning from January 27 to February 23, 1881. The results of the thirty-fifth and final ballot of both houses combined are as follows:

State legislature results
Party	Candidate	Votes	%
Republican	John I. Mitchell	150	59.76
Democratic	William A. Wallace (Inc.)	92	36.65
N/A	Not voting	7	2.79
N/A	Other	2	0.80
Totals		251	100.00%

== See also ==
- 1880–81 United States Senate elections

Preceded by 1875	Pennsylvania U.S. Senate election (Class I); 1881	Succeeded by 1887
