= 1875 United States Senate election in Pennsylvania =

The 1875 United States Senate election in Pennsylvania was held on January 19, 1875. William A. Wallace was elected by the Pennsylvania General Assembly to the United States Senate.

== Results ==
The Pennsylvania General Assembly, consisting of the House of Representatives and the Senate, convened on January 19, 1875, to elect a senator to serve the term beginning on March 4, 1875. The results of the vote of both houses combined are as follows:

State legislature results
Party	Candidate	Votes	%
Democratic	William A. Wallace	125	49.80
Republican	John Allison	116	46.22
N/A	Not voting	10	3.98
Totals		251	100.00%

== See also ==
- 1874–75 United States Senate elections

Preceded by 1869	Pennsylvania U.S. Senate election (Class I); 1875	Succeeded by 1881
