= John I. Mitchell =

American politician and judge (1838–1907)

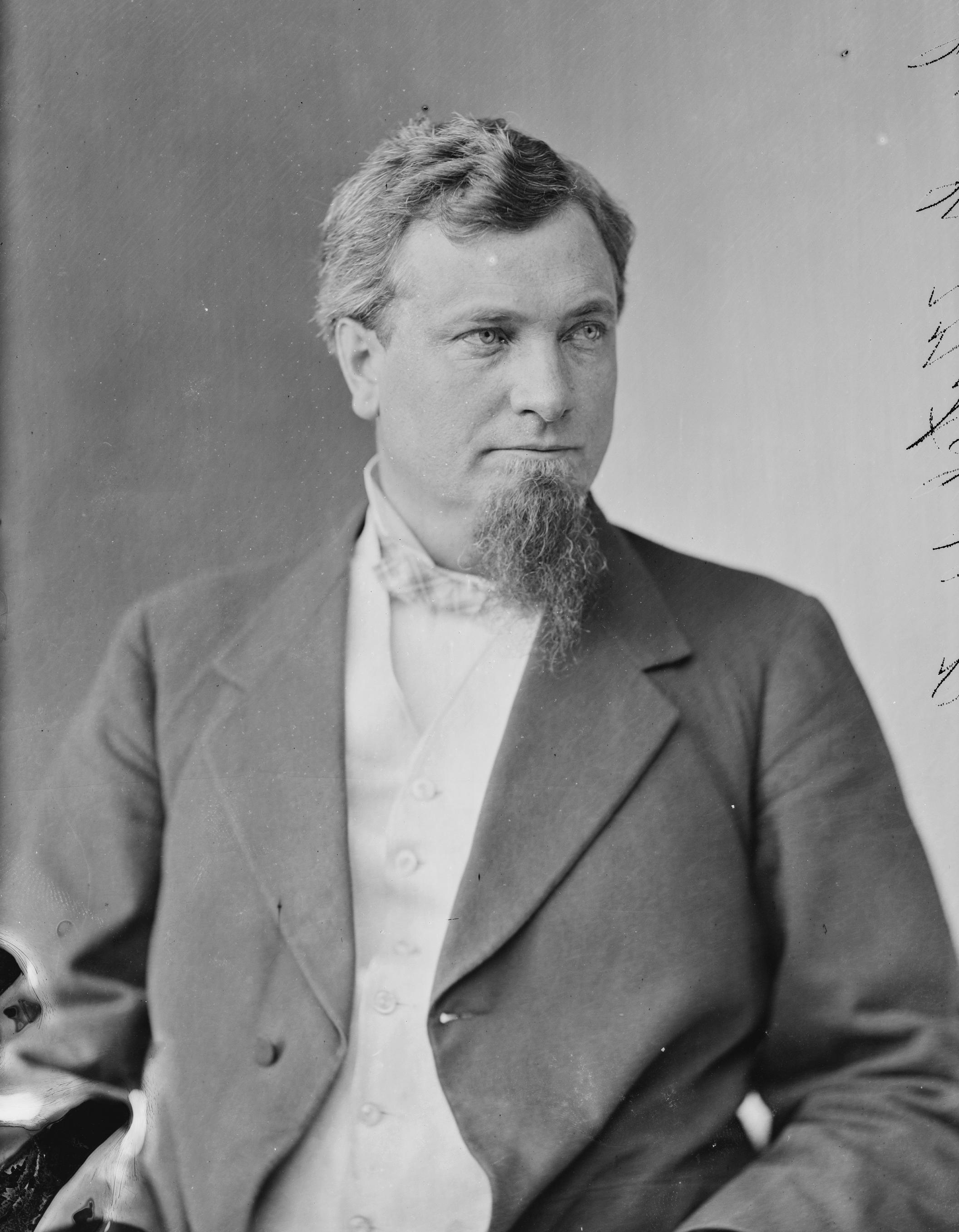
- Mitchell, 1865–1880

United States Senator from Pennsylvania
- In office March 4, 1881 – March 3, 1887
- Preceded by: William A. Wallace
- Succeeded by: Matthew S. Quay

Member of the U.S. House of Representatives from Pennsylvania's 16th district
- In office March 4, 1877 – March 3, 1881
- Preceded by: Sobieski Ross
- Succeeded by: Robert J.C. Walker

Member of the Pennsylvania House of Representatives
- In office 1872-1876

Personal details
- Born: John Inscho Mitchell; July 28, 1838 Tioga Township, Tioga County, Pennsylvania, U.S.
- Died: August 20, 1907 (aged 69) Wellsboro, Pennsylvania, U.S.
- Party: Republican
- Profession: Politician, Lawyer, Judge

Military service
- Allegiance: United States of America; Union
- Branch/service: Union Army
- Years of service: 1862 – 1863
- Rank: Captain
- Unit: 166th Pennsylvania Infantry Regiment
- Battles/wars: American Civil War

John Inscho Mitchell (July 28, 1838 – August 20, 1907) was an American lawyer, jurist, and Republican party politician from Tioga County, Pennsylvania. He served in the state legislature and represented Pennsylvania in both the U.S. House and Senate. He was later a judge in several state courts.

== Biography ==
John Inscho Mitchell was born in Tioga Township, Tioga County, Pennsylvania on July 28, 1838. He attended common school in addition to receiving private instruction. Mitchell later received his college education at the University of Lewisburg, modern-day Bucknell University.

After graduating from college in 1859, Mitchell taught school until 1861, when he joined the Union Army. He served in the Civil War as a lieutenant and captain in the 166th Regiment of the Pennsylvania Volunteer Infantry. Mitchell subsequently pursued an education in law and was admitted to the bar in 1864. He served as District Attorney of Tioga County from 1868 to 1871. He ran for, was elected to and served in the Pennsylvania State House of Representatives between 1872 and 1876 until his election to the United States House of Representatives, where he served from 1877 to 1881. In 1881, Mitchell was elected to the United States Senate. He served there for one six-year term and was chairman of the Committee on the Mississippi River and Its Tributaries and Committee on Pensions.

After the conclusion of his congressional career, Mitchell served as judge of the court of common pleas of Pennsylvania's fourth district from 1888 to 1899. He subsequently served for one session as judge of the Superior Court of Pennsylvania.

Mitchell died in Wellsboro, Pennsylvania on August 20, 1907, and was interred in Wellsboro Cemetery.

U.S. House of Representatives
Preceded by Sobieski Ross	Member of the U.S. House of Representatives from Pennsylvania's 16th congressional district March 4, 1877 – March 4, 1881	Succeeded by Robert J. C. Walker
U.S. Senate
Preceded by William A. Wallace	U.S. senator (Class 1) from Pennsylvania; March 4, 1881 – March 4, 1887; Served alongside: J. Donald Cameron	Succeeded by Matthew S. Quay
