= Charles R. Buckalew =

American politician

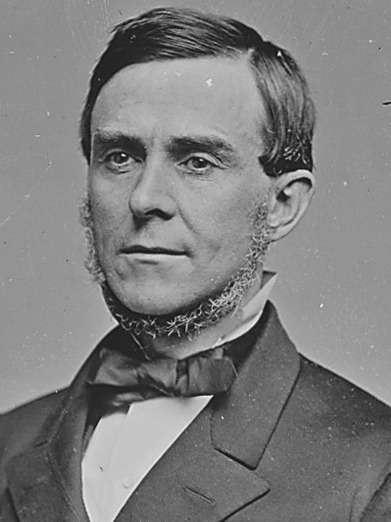
- Buckalew c. 1860–1865

United States Senator from Pennsylvania
- In office March 4, 1863 – March 4, 1869
- Preceded by: David Wilmot
- Succeeded by: John Scott

United States Minister Resident in Ecuador
- In office September 20, 1858 – July 10, 1861
- President: James Buchanan; Abraham Lincoln
- Preceded by: Philo White
- Succeeded by: Frederick Hassaurek

Member of the U.S. House of Representatives from Pennsylvania
- In office March 4, 1887 – March 3, 1891
- Preceded by: John B. Storm
- Succeeded by: Simon P. Wolverton
- Constituency: 11th district (1887–1889); 17th district (1889–1891)

Member of the Pennsylvania Senate
- In office 1851–1854
- Preceded by: Robert Chambers Sterrett
- Succeeded by: Bartram A. Schaffer
- Constituency: 16th district
- In office 1857–1858
- Preceded by: Samuel Wherry
- Succeeded by: Henry Fetter
- Constituency: 13th district
- In office 1869–1870
- Preceded by: David Mumma
- Succeeded by: Butler B. Strang
- Constituency: 16th district

Personal details
- Born: Charles Rollin Buckalew; December 28, 1821 Fishing Creek Township, Pennsylvania, U.S.
- Died: May 19, 1899 (aged 77) Bloomsburg, Pennsylvania, U.S.
- Party: Democratic
- Spouse: Permelia Wadsworth Buckalew
- Profession: Politician, Lawyer

Charles Rollin Buckalew (December 28, 1821 – May 19, 1899) was an American lawyer, diplomat, and Democratic Party politician from Pennsylvania. He represented the state for one term in the United States Senate, where he was an advocate of proportional representation and cumulative voting, from 1863 to 1869.

Buckalew also served three nonconsecutive terms in the Pennsylvania Senate (1851–1854, 1859–1860, and 1869–1870) and two consecutive terms in the U.S. House of Representatives from 1887 to 1891. He served as Minister Resident for Ecuador under President James Buchanan from 1858 to 1861.

== Early life and education ==
Buckalew was born in Fishing Creek Township, Pennsylvania on December 28, 1821, to John McKinney Sr. and Martha Funston Buckalew. He was a graduate of Harford Academy, Susquehanna County, Pennsylvania, where he studied law. He was admitted to the bar in 1843.

== Career ==
Buckalew was the most influential early advocate of proportional representation in the United States. His proposals for a type of voting system known as cumulative voting gained significant support in Congress, and he played a central role in the adoption of cumulative voting in several places, including Illinois for state legislative elections in 1870, a system that lasted in that state until 1980.

Buckalew was elected by the Pennsylvania General Assembly to the U.S. Senate in 1863. In a number of speeches, notably in the Senate on July 11, 1867; at a large public meeting in Philadelphia in November of the same year; before the Social Science Association at Philadelphia in October 1870; and in the Senate of Pennsylvania on March 27, 1871; as well as in the report of the Select Committee on Representative Reform of the United States Senate, of which be was chairman, Buckalew argued persuasively for the use of cumulative voting in the election of representatives in Congress, state legislatures, town councils and other bodies.

Buckalew's bill in the Senate would have allowed all the electors of a state to have the number of votes equal to the number of house of representatives members to be elected from that state. The voter could give all his votes to one candidate, or distribute them in any fashion, equally or unequally, among candidates. The candidates with the highest number of votes would be elected.

As a senator, Buckalew voted in 1866 against the District of Columbia Suffrage Act, a bill, intended by Republicans as a model for the postwar South generally, to extend voting rights to Black men in Washington, D.C.

In addition to serving in Congress and the Pennsylvania state legislature, Buckalew was commissioner to exchange ratifications of a treaty with Paraguay in 1854; chairman of the Democratic State committee in 1857; appointed one of the commissioners to revise the penal code of Pennsylvania in 1857; Minister Resident to the Republic of Ecuador 1858–1861; unsuccessful candidate for governor of Pennsylvania in 1872; and a delegate to the Pennsylvania constitutional convention of 1873.

He resumed the practice of law when he left Congress in 1891, age 69, in Bloomsburg, Columbia County, where he died on May 19, 1899. He is interred in Rosemont Cemetery in Bloomsburg.

Buckalew's writings and speeches on cumulative voting were collected in an 1872 book titled Proportional Representation. 1872, Philadelphia, J. Campbell & Son.

== References and notes ==
Party political offices
Preceded by Asa Packer	Democratic nominee for Governor of Pennsylvania; 1872	Succeeded by Cyrus L. Pershing
Pennsylvania State Senate
Preceded by Robert Chambers Sterrett	Member of the Pennsylvania Senate, 16th district 1851-1854	Succeeded by Bartram A. Schaffer
Preceded by Samuel Wherry	Member of the Pennsylvania Senate, 13th district 1857-1858	Succeeded by Henry Fetter
Preceded by David Mumma	Member of the Pennsylvania Senate, 16th district 1869-1870	Succeeded by Butler B. Strang
U.S. Senate
Preceded by David Wilmot	U.S. senator (Class 1) from Pennsylvania; March 4, 1863 – March 4, 1869; Served alongside: Edgar Cowan and Simon Cameron	Succeeded by John Scott
U.S. House of Representatives
Preceded by John B. Storm	Member of the U.S. House of Representatives from Pennsylvania's 11th congressional district March 4, 1887 – March 4, 1889	Succeeded by Joseph A. Scranton
Preceded by Edward Scull	Member of the U.S. House of Representatives from Pennsylvania's 17th congressional district March 4, 1889 – March 4, 1891	Succeeded by Simon P. Wolverton
Diplomatic posts
Preceded by Philo White	United States Minister Resident, Ecuador; 20 September 1858 – 10 July 1861	Succeeded by Frederick Hassaurek
