= 1863 United States Senate election in Pennsylvania =

The 1863 United States Senate election in Pennsylvania was held on January 13, 1863. Charles Buckalew was elected by the Pennsylvania General Assembly to the United States Senate.

== Results ==
The Pennsylvania General Assembly, consisting of the House of Representatives and the Senate, convened on January 13, 1863, to elect a senator to serve the term beginning on March 4, 1863. The results of the vote of both houses combined are as follows:

State legislature results
Party	Candidate	Votes	%
Democratic	Charles R. Buckalew	67	50.38
Republican	Simon Cameron	65	48.87
Republican	William D. Kelley	1	0.75
Totals		133	100.00%

== See also ==
- 1862–63 United States Senate elections

Preceded by 1861	Pennsylvania U.S. Senate election (Class I); 1863	Succeeded by 1869
