= 1869 United States Senate election in Massachusetts =

- January 19, 1869

40 Members of the Massachusetts Senate 231 Members of the Massachusetts House Majority vote of each house needed to win
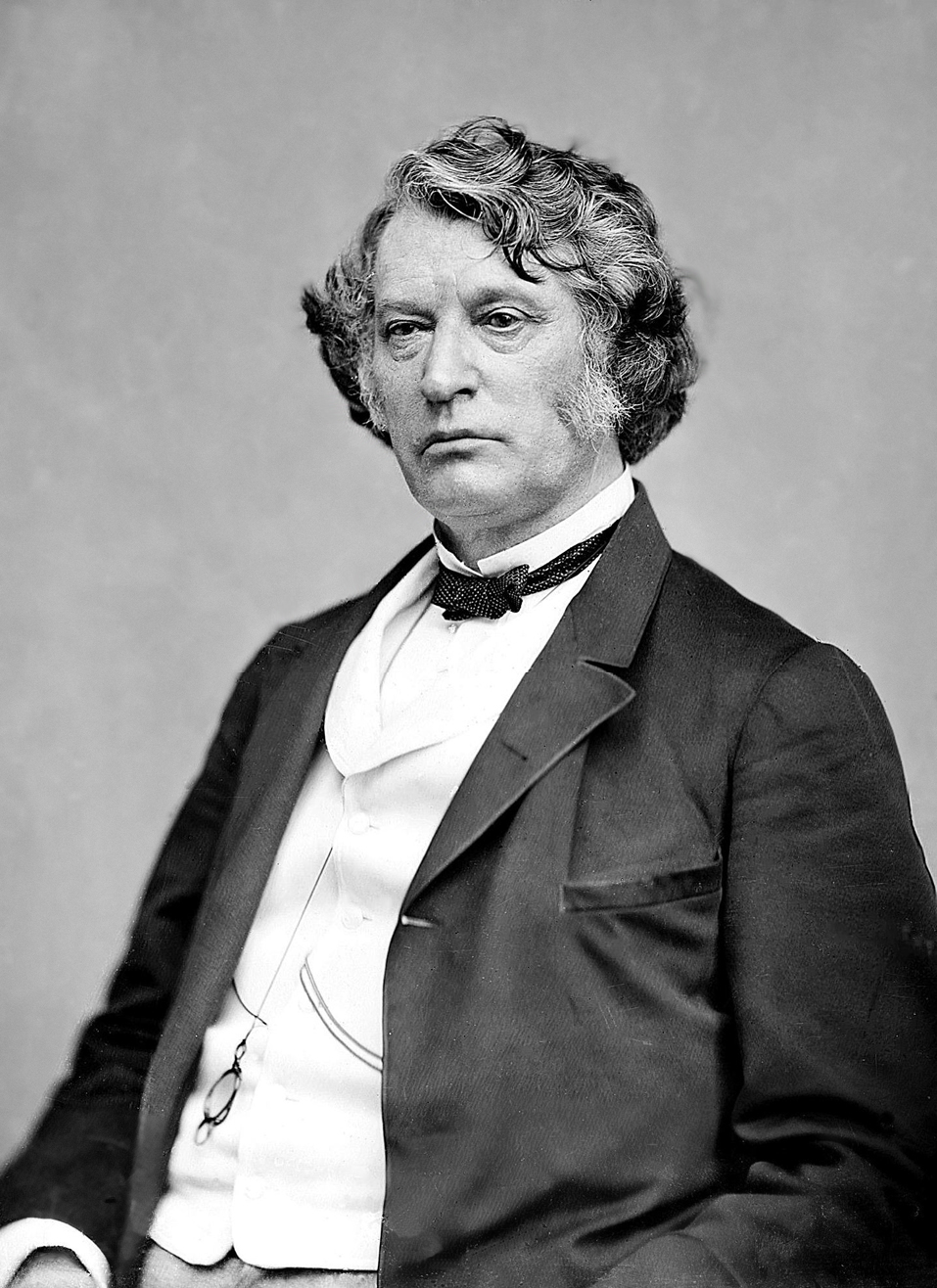

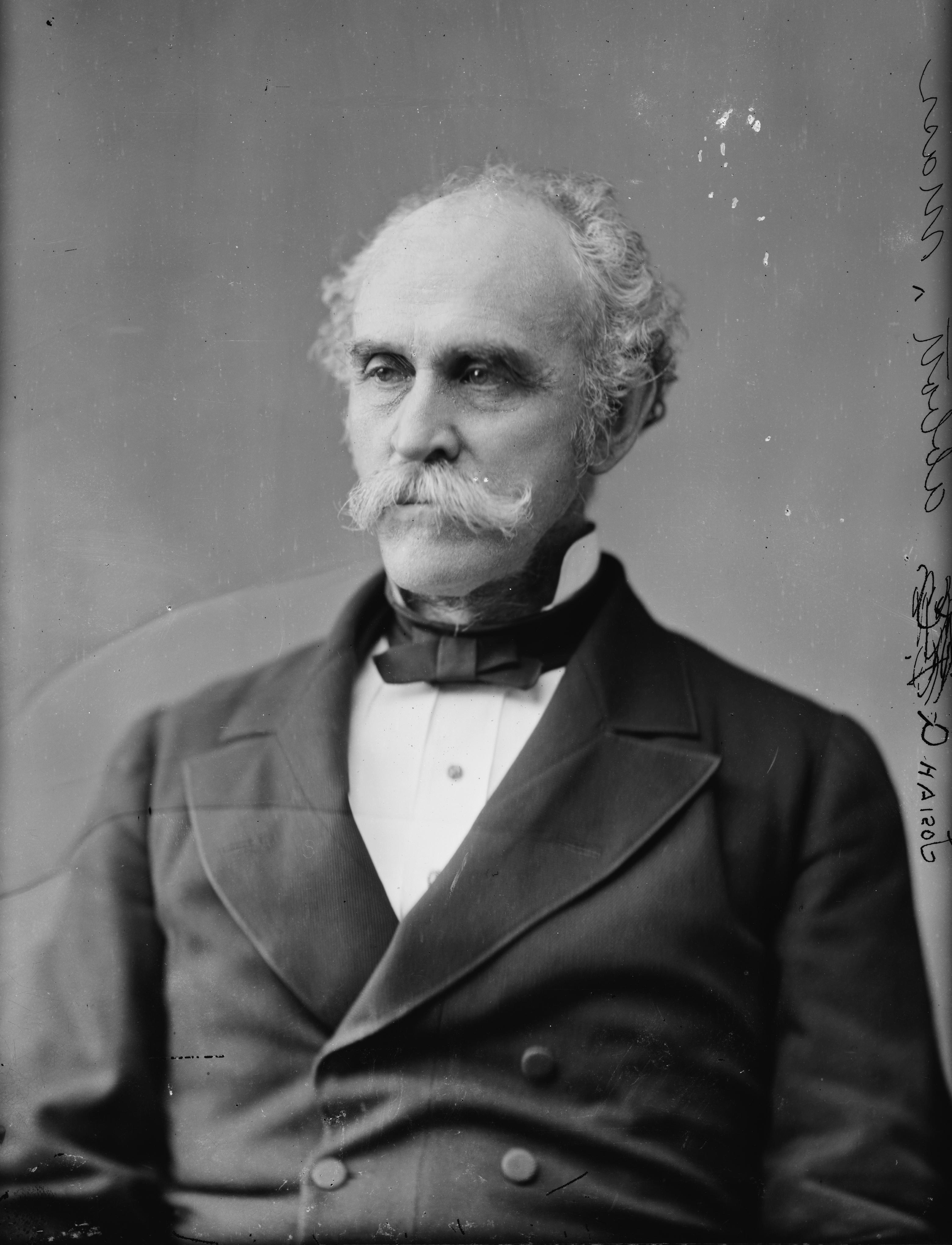
Nominee	Charles Sumner	Josiah Abbott
Party	Republican	Democratic
Senate	37	2
Percentage	92.5%	5%
House	216	14
Percentage	93.51%	6.06%
Senator before election
Charles Sumner
Republican
Elected Senator
Charles Sumner
Republican

The 1869 United States Senate election in Massachusetts was held on January 19, 1869. Incumbent Charles Sumner was re-elected to a fourth term in office.

At the time, Massachusetts elected United States senators by a majority vote of each separate house of the Massachusetts General Court: the House and the Senate.

== Background ==
In the 1868 state legislative elections, Republicans maintained an overwhelming majority in both houses. Only 20 Democratic Representatives and two Democratic Senators were elected. This ensured Sumner's re-election in the January session, though there was some speculation that Sumner would vacate his seat to accept a Cabinet appointment in the newly elected Grant administration.

== Election ==
=== Election in the House ===
1869 Senate election in the House
Party	Candidate	Votes	%
Republican	Charles Sumner (incumbent)	216	93.51%
Democratic	Josiah G. Abbott	14	6.06%
Republican	Nathaniel P. Banks	1	0.43%
Total votes		231	100.00%

=== Election in the Senate ===
1869 Senate election in the Senate
Party	Candidate	Votes	%
Republican	Charles Sumner (incumbent)	37	92.5%
Democratic	Josiah G. Abbott	2	5%
None	No vote	1	2.5%
Total votes		40	100.00%
