= William A. Wallace =

American lawyer and politician (1827–1896)

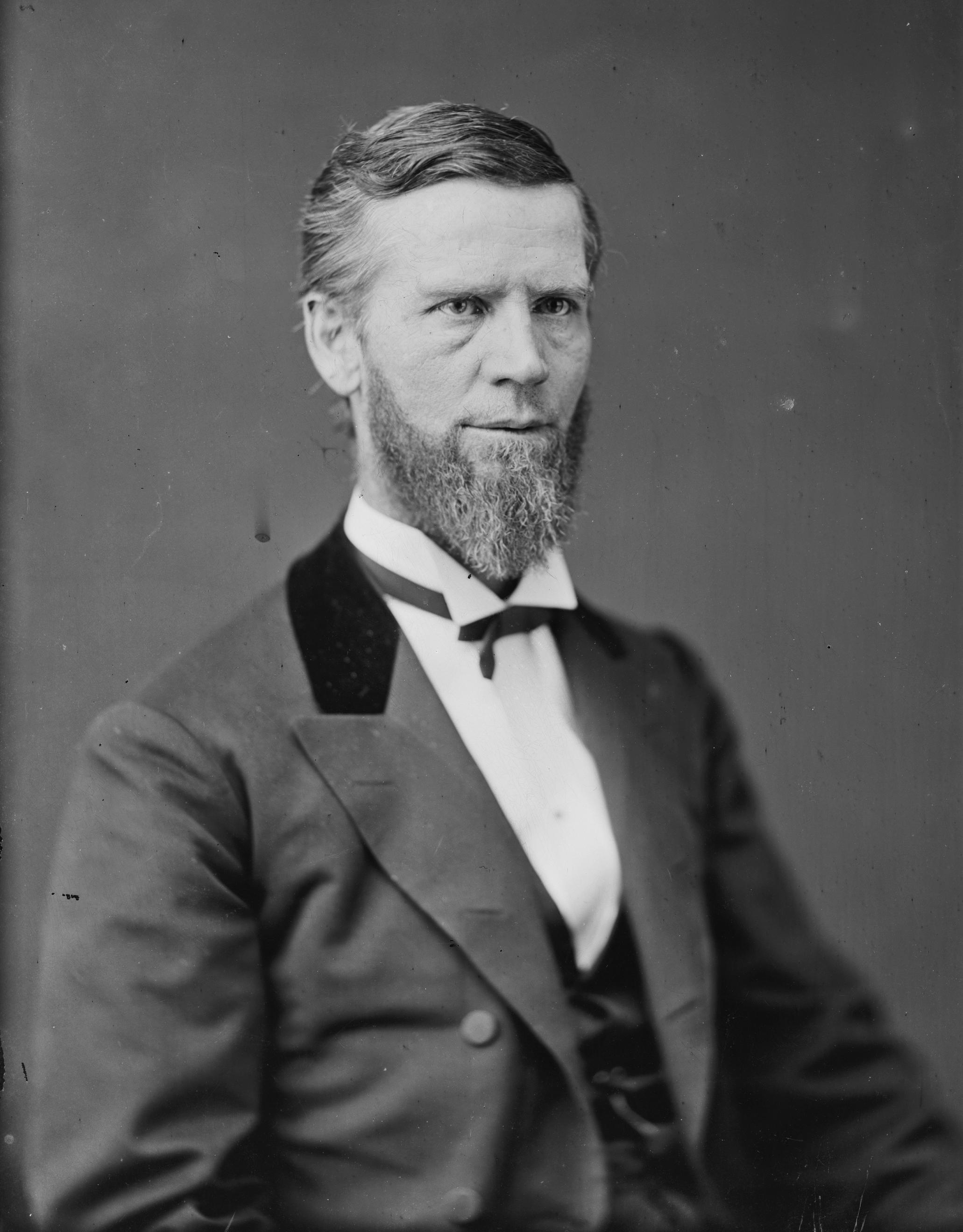
- Wallace, 1865–1880

United States Senator from Pennsylvania
- In office March 4, 1875 – March 3, 1881
- Preceded by: John Scott
- Succeeded by: John I. Mitchell

Chairman of the Senate Democratic Caucus
- In office March 4, 1877 – March 4, 1881
- Preceded by: John W. Stevenson
- Succeeded by: George H. Pendleton

Member of the Pennsylvania Senate for the 34th district
- In office 1875–1886

Member of the Pennsylvania Senate for the 18th district
- In office 1872–1874

Member of the Pennsylvania Senate for the 23rd district
- In office 1865–1871

Member of the Pennsylvania Senate for the 20th district
- In office 1863–1864

Personal details
- Born: William Andrew Wallace; November 28, 1827 Huntingdon, Pennsylvania, U.S.
- Died: May 22, 1896 (aged 68) New York City, U.S.
- Party: Democratic

William Andrew Wallace (November 28, 1827 – May 22, 1896) was an American lawyer and politician from Pennsylvania who served as a Democratic member of the United States Senate for Pennsylvania from 1875 to 1881. He also served as a member of the Pennsylvania State Senate for the 20th district from 1863 to 1886 including as speaker in 1871.

== Biography ==
William Wallace was born on November 28, 1827, in Huntingdon, Pennsylvania, to Robert Wallace and Jane Hemphill. He relocated with his parents to Clearfield, Pennsylvania, in 1836. He graduated from Clearfield academy and began studying law at the age of 16 at his father's law practice. He was admitted to the bar in 1847 and began work as a lawyer in Clearfield in addition to teaching at Clearfield Academy.

He served as a captain of the Clearfield Guards in 1854 and became a prominent member of the Peace Democrats from Pennsylvania during the U.S. Civil War.

He served in the Pennsylvania State Senate for the 20th district from 1863 to 1886, including as Speaker in 1871. While in the State Senate, Wallace was member of a commission charged with drafting amendments to the 1874 Pennsylvania Constitution.

In 1875, Wallace was elected as a Democrat by the Pennsylvania General Assembly to the United States Senate. He served one term from March 1875 until March 1881, and was unsuccessful in seeking re-election in 1881. In the U.S. Senate, Wallace served as chairman of the Democratic Conference from 1877 until 1881 and as chairman of the Committee on the Revision of Laws of the United States during the 46th Congress (1879–81). He also served on the Finance, Appropriations and Foreign Relations committees.

After his U.S. Senate service, Wallace continued to practice law and returned to the state senate.

Wallace was a successful businessman and in 1864 purchased the Smith Mines from Andrew Curtin and renamed them the Wallace Mines. He served as a member of the first board of directors of the Clearfield County Bank in 1865 and the County National Bank of Clearfield. In 1871, Wallace invested in land adjacent to the Logan Coal Company and began a coal mining operation which he sold in 1878. He worked as vice president of the Texas and Pacific Railroad, president of the Beech Creek Railroad, director of the Clearfield Cemetery Association and part owner of the Wallacetown Brick Company.

Wallace was an unsuccessful candidate for Governor of Pennsylvania twice, once in 1886 and again in 1890.

Wallace died of a stroke while in New York City on business in 1896.

== Footnotes ==
Pennsylvania State Senate
Preceded by	Member of the Pennsylvania Senate, 20th district 1863-1886	Succeeded by
U.S. Senate
Preceded by John Scott	U.S. Senator (Class 1) from Pennsylvania; 1875–1881; Served alongside: Simon Cameron, J. Donald Cameron	Succeeded by John I. Mitchell
Preceded by Isaac P. Christiancy	Chair of the Senate Law Revision Committee; 1879–1881	Succeeded by Omar D. Conger
Party political offices
Preceded by John W. Stevenson	Chair of the Senate Democratic Caucus; 1877–1881	Succeeded by George H. Pendleton
