= 1867 United States Senate election in Pennsylvania =

- January 15, 1867
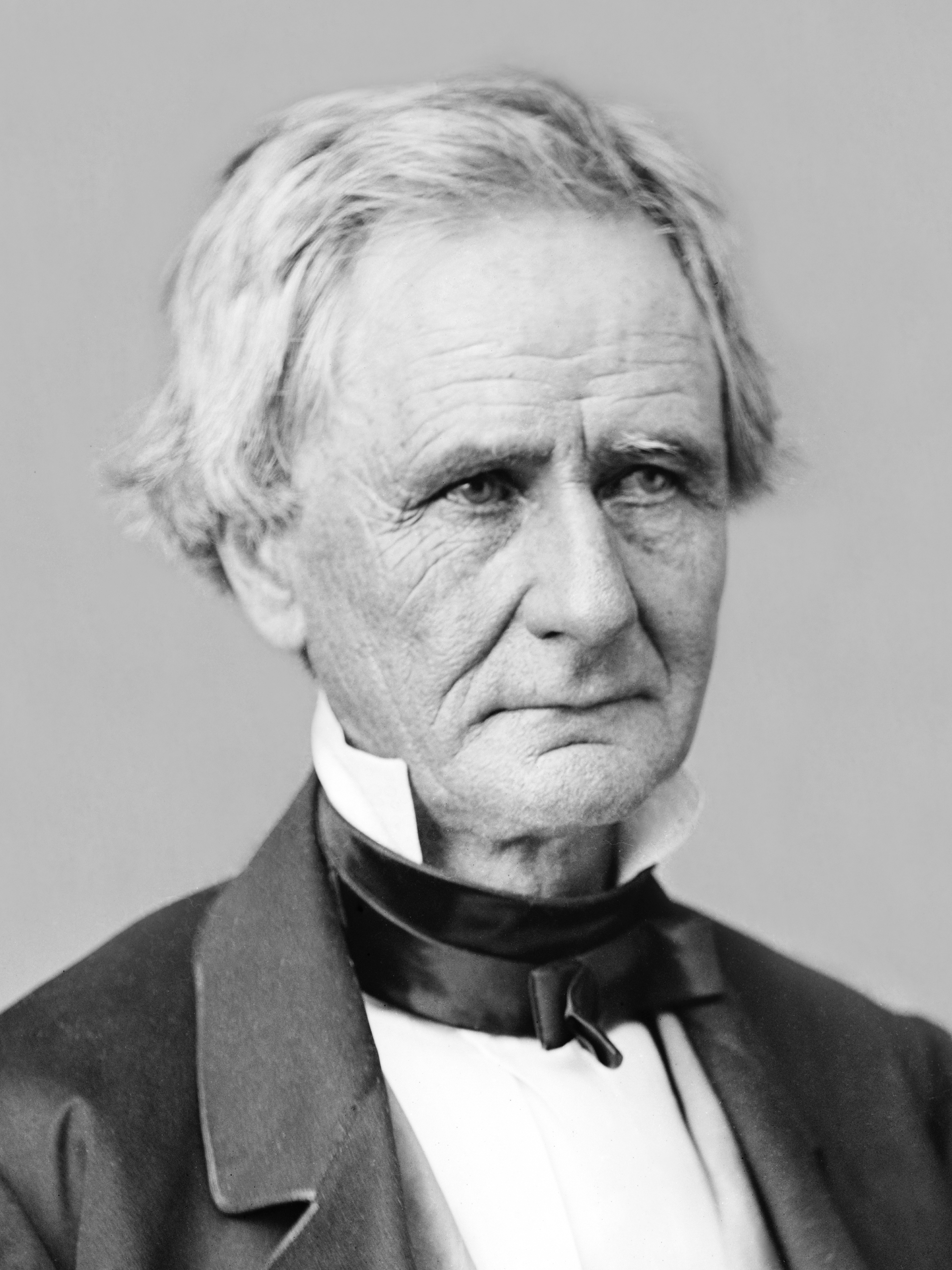

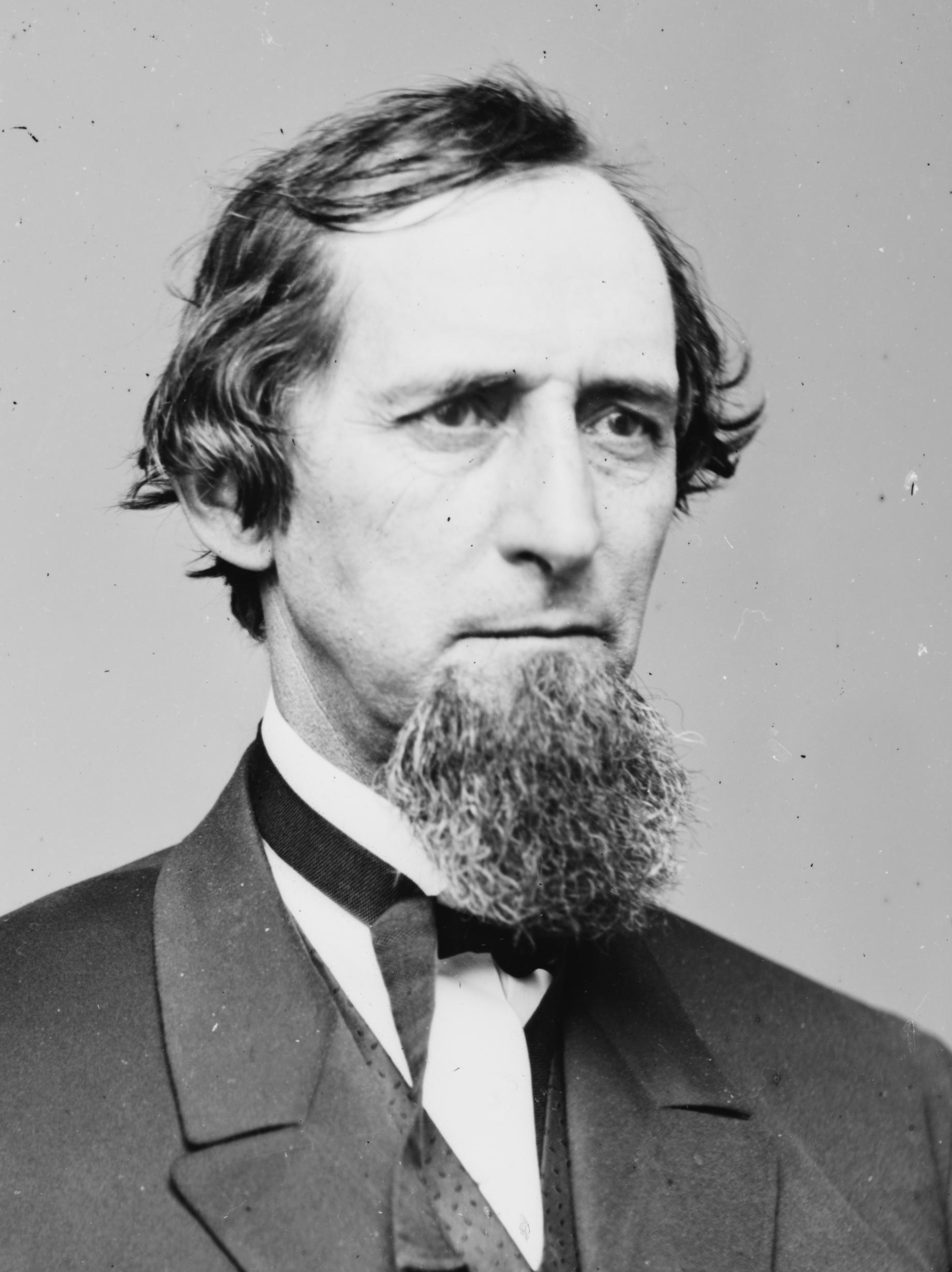
Nominee	Simon Cameron	Edgar Cowan
Party	Republican	Republican
Alliance		Democratic
Leg. vote	82	49
Percentage	62.60%	37.40%
- Cameron: Cowan: No vote
U.S. senator before election
Edgar Cowan
Republican
Elected U.S. Senator
Simon Cameron
Republican

On January 15, 1867, Simon Cameron was elected to the United States Senate by the Pennsylvania General Assembly for the third time; it had previously chosen him in 1845 and 1857. The legislature voted for Cameron over the incumbent, Senator Edgar Cowan, who, though a Republican, was endorsed by the Democratic legislative caucus. With the Republican Party holding a large majority in the legislature, the main battle was for its endorsement: the caucus of Republican legislators had voted for Cameron over Governor Andrew Curtin.

Cameron and Curtin each led a different faction of the Republican Party and had clashed as early as 1855, resulting in a bitter rivalry. Cameron tried to prevent Curtin from getting the Republican nomination for governor in 1860, while Curtin attempted to stop Cameron from receiving a post in Abraham Lincoln's cabinet; each was unsuccessful. Cameron's time as Secretary of War ended with his resignation under pressure, and he sought, unsuccessfully, to return to the Senate in 1863. With Curtin's second term as governor ending in 1867 and Cameron still wanting to return to the Senate, each pursued Cowan's seat.

Cowan had moved away from the Republican mainstream, becoming an ally of President Andrew Johnson, and was not a contender for the party endorsement. Others seeking the Republican nomination included Representative Thaddeus Stevens and Galusha Grow, a former speaker of the House of Representatives, but they needed a deadlock between the main contenders to have a chance. Both Cameron and Curtin sought support from among Republican candidates for the legislature, and also tried to place their supporters in positions that might influence the outcome.

Curtin supporter Matthew Quay was the favorite to become Speaker of the Pennsylvania House of Representatives, but the other Senate contenders combined to defeat him, and the victor, Cameron supporter John P. Glass, used his powers to influence Republican legislators. Cameron received the necessary majority of Republican legislators to gain the party's endorsement, while Cowan was endorsed by the Democrats. When the legislature voted, Cameron easily defeated Cowan, and served in the Senate until 1877; his powerful political machine dominated Pennsylvania politics for a half century. Curtin eventually switched to the Democratic Party, and served three terms in the House of Representatives in the 1880s; Cowan never held public office again.

== Background ==
In drafting the national Constitution, the members of the Constitutional Convention of 1787 agreed that United States Senators would be chosen by state legislatures, not by the people. Federal law prescribed that the senatorial election was to take place beginning on the second Tuesday after the two houses of the legislature which would be in office when the senatorial term expired, convened and chose legislative officers. On the designated day, balloting for senator would take place in each of the two chambers of the legislature. If a majority of each house voted for the same candidate, then the candidate would be declared elected at the joint assembly held the following day at noon. Otherwise, there would be a roll-call vote of all legislators, with a majority of those present needed to elect. In the event that no senator was elected, the legislature was required to hold at least one vote in joint assembly each day until it ended the session or a senator was elected. Generally, the candidate of the majority party in the legislature was chosen by a vote of its legislative caucus.

Since its founding in the mid-1850s, the Pennsylvania Republican Party had generally divided into factions, reflecting its makeup, a coalition between former members of the Democratic Party and former Whigs. In the runup to the 1867 Senate contest, the onetime Democrats were led by former senator and Secretary of War Simon Cameron, while the former Whigs were led by Governor Andrew Curtin. The two men had first clashed in seeking the endorsement of the American Party (better known as the Know Nothings) for Senate in 1855, and in the course of that election had become bitter enemies.

Cameron had twice served as senator from Pennsylvania. He was elected by the Pennsylvania General Assembly in 1845 as a Democrat to serve the uncompleted term of James Buchanan, who had resigned to become United States secretary of state. He was elected again in 1857 as a Republican, but resigned in 1861 to become Abraham Lincoln's secretary of war, with David Wilmot his successor in the Senate. Cameron resigned as war secretary after less than a year, during the Civil War, under pressure from Lincoln and Congress, and was appointed U.S. minister to Russia, but soon resigned. He was the Republican candidate for Senate in the 1863 election, but a Democrat was elected instead.

Curtin, a lawyer, had been an activist for the Whig Party, speaking during its campaigns beginning in 1840. After helping James Pollock gain election as governor in 1855, he was given the post of secretary of the commonwealth. He became a rival to Cameron, opposing his 1857 Senate run. In 1860, he sought to become governor of Pennsylvania, with Cameron (who had presidential aspirations) opposing his candidacy. Curtin gained the nomination, but Cameron received Pennsylvania's endorsement as its favorite son candidate for president. Nevertheless, Curtin worked to defeat Cameron's candidacy, and, after Lincoln and Curtin were elected, tried to prevent Cameron from receiving a cabinet post. Cameron worked to defeat Curtin's renomination in 1863, but Curtin gained a second three-year term. In a letter, Cameron informed Lincoln, "there are many good Republicans and pious Christians who would see him [Curtin] in hell."

The incumbent senator whose seat was to be filled in 1867, Edgar Cowan, was also a lawyer who had been an orator for the Whigs. He became known as a successful defense attorney, and later as a prosecutor, and joined the Republican Party in 1856. An opponent of the extension of slavery into the territories, he had supported Lincoln, cast a vote for him as a presidential elector, and, although a relative unknown, defeated Wilmot for the Republican endorsement in 1861 to gain a six-year Senate term. (Note: Pennsylvania held two Senate elections in 1861. Cowan was elected for a full six-year term in January. Cameron's resignation necessitated an election to fill the remainder of his term, to expire in 1863, which Wilmot won.) As a senator, Cowan charted an independent course, and voted against the more punitive pieces of wartime legislation, outraging many in Congress and in the press. After the war, he became an ally of President Andrew Johnson, a Democrat who ran with Lincoln on the 1864 National Union Party ticket, and who became president after Lincoln's assassination in 1865.

== Planning ==
When, in January 1863, Cameron was defeated in the Senate election by Charles Buckalew, 67 votes to 65, he immediately began planning to win the state's next Senate election, in 1867. To this end, he began rebuilding his personal political machine, composed of his numerous friends and supporters from around Pennsylvania, which had fallen into disrepair due to his absence from the state. Cameron's fall from cabinet office to his Senate defeat, together with Curtin's successful re-election in 1863, placed the ex-Whig faction of the Republicans in the ascendancy. In contrast with the near-disgrace that had befallen Cameron, Governor Curtin was known as "the soldier's friend" and received praise for leading the state through the war years.

Cameron boosted his chances, restoring himself to Lincoln's good graces by aiding the president's re-election. At Lincoln's request, Cameron got the Republican members of the legislature to issue a letter to the president urging him to seek a second term—Cameron had, thirty years previously, penned such a "spontaneous" letter on behalf of Andrew Jackson under similar circumstances. He also saw to it that Pennsylvania sent a united delegation in support of Lincoln to the 1864 National Union National Convention, which nominated Lincoln, and arranged support for Andrew Johnson, the military governor of Tennessee, whom Lincoln wanted as running mate. Cameron campaigned for Lincoln in the fall, and the re-elected president's gratitude translated into participation in political patronage, which helped Cameron retain the allegiance of his supporters through his ability to reward them with civil and military posts. Curtin's control of Pennsylvania state patronage could not compete with Cameron's influence on federal appointments, and the governor and his supporters complained about the favoritism shown Cameron.

Lincoln's assassination in April 1865 upended the patronage arrangements, and there were battles over appointments, especially since many officials, such as postmasters, had been appointed for four-year terms. Cameron was generally successful, retaining the plum post of postmaster of Philadelphia for a supporter, but supporters of Curtin and Representative Thaddeus Stevens joined together to deny Cameron backers the positions of state attorney general and chairman of the party, which Cameron had hoped for. This gave Curtin important momentum going into the crucial year of 1866.

== 1866 campaign ==
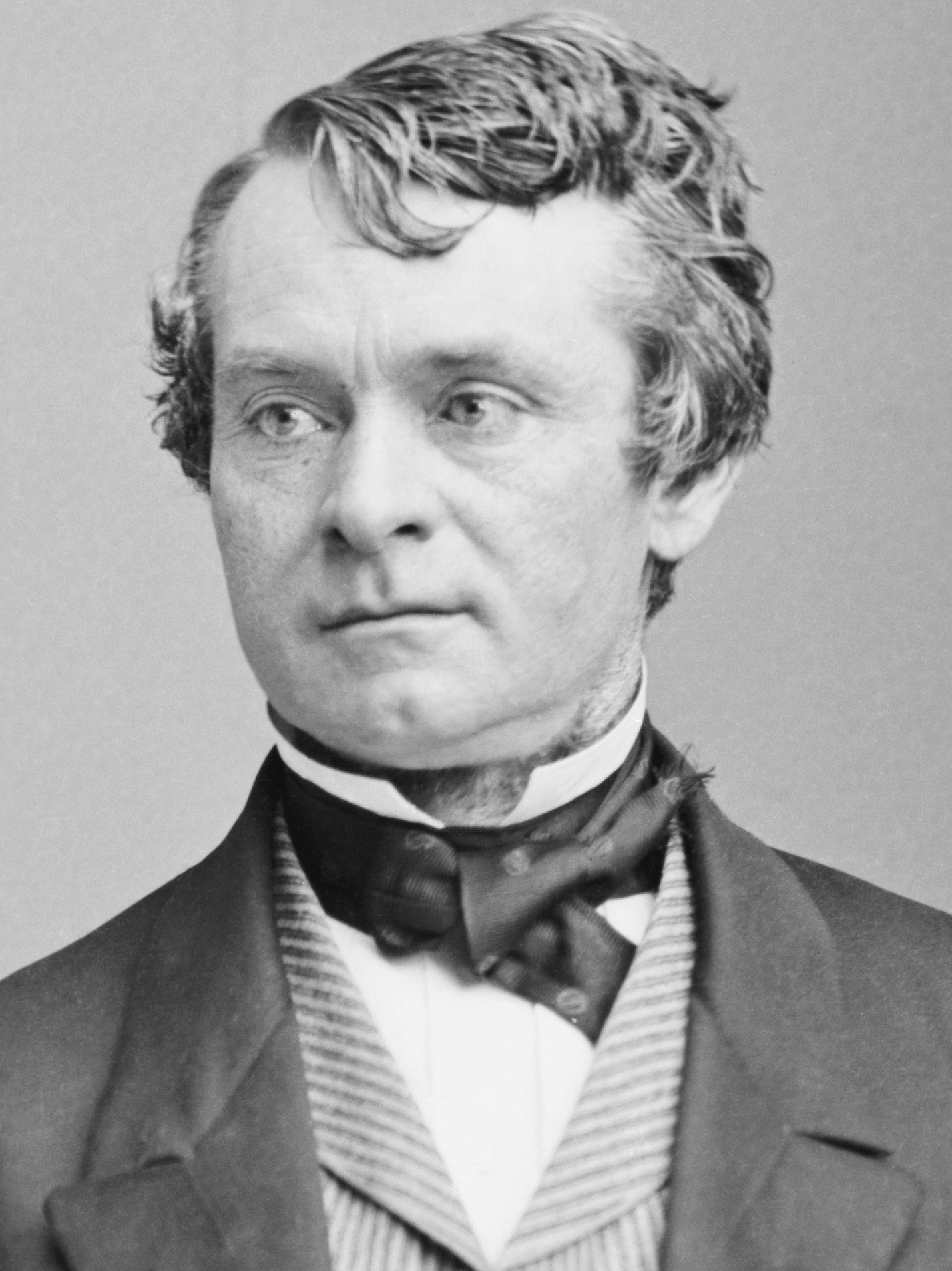
Governor Andrew Curtin

Most important to Cameron in his planning were the office of governor—Curtin's successor would be elected in 1866—that of secretary of the commonwealth (chosen by the governor), and the speakership of the state House of Representatives. Both major contenders wanted control of these offices, since the speakers of the two houses of the legislature could reward those who would vote for senator with seats on important committees, and the governor and secretary of the commonwealth could dispense patronage. Both also wanted to influence local conventions that would nominate Republican candidates for legislative seats. Curtin, having served two consecutive terms as governor, was ineligible under Pennsylvania's 1838 constitution to run again for the office in 1866.

Curtin fell ill in December 1865 and spent two months recuperating in Cuba, hampering his strategy in advance of the March 1866 state convention at which Republicans would nominate a candidate for governor. He wanted former state legislator Winthrop Welles Ketcham as the gubernatorial candidate, but neglected to make his choice clear to his supporters, and some, such as Alexander McClure, backed Frank Johnson. Curtin wrote to his secretary of the commonwealth, Eli Slifer: "do not neglect the composition of the convention—Cameron will pack it if he can and a little work will head him." Cameron backed a declared Stevens supporter, former Union general and Kansas Territory governor, John W. Geary, who gained the former senator's support in exchange for a promise to appoint a Cameron supporter as secretary of the commonwealth. Cameron's control of the convention came as an unpleasant surprise to Curtin's supporters, to whom Geary was objectionable. Geary was easily nominated, which increased Cameron's chances of victory in the senatorial race at the expense of Curtin.

Some of the focus was taken off the intraparty rivalry between Cameron and Curtin by the increasingly-hostile relationship between Republicans and President Johnson, who differed over Reconstruction, with the president favoring easier terms to restore the seceded states to full status in the Union. Curtin and Cameron supporters, while they still battled for nominations, found themselves making uneasy common cause at local conventions to ensure the defeat of candidates who supported Johnson's policies. The major candidates did not differ over Johnson, except each vied to show that he was more anti-Johnson, and had warned against his candidacy with Lincoln in 1864. Curtin made his break with Johnson after a Radical Republican governor was elected in Connecticut in April 1866; the timing of Cameron's break is less certain, but by August, he was writing that had he been listened to, Johnson would not have been nominated for vice president.

Senator Cowan, together with a few minor Republican officials, tried to piece together a pro-Johnson movement within Pennsylvania, culminating in the 1866 National Union Convention in Philadelphia in August. However, with relatively few Republican candidates for the legislature supporting Johnson, the only means whereby supporters could back the president was by voting Democratic, but many refused to consider voting for the party they deemed responsible for the Civil War. Republicans in the 1866 campaign originated the style of electioneering that would become known as "waving the bloody shirt": arguing that Republican victory was necessary so as not to squander the gains paid for with so much blood in the Civil War.

During the election campaign for state offices, both Cameron and Curtin tried to pick up votes for their senatorial campaigns—Curtin wrote that he was working closely with the Philadelphia Republican organization, and hoped to pick up all but three Republican votes from there. Governor Curtin was a better speaker than Cameron, and most of the Republican Party's chief orators supported the governor. Cameron could not afford to abandon the field to them, and though he made few outdoor speeches to large crowds, often presided over campaign rallies, and sometimes introduced the main speaker with remarks of his own. Although Stevens was the acknowledged master of dissecting opponents with cutting oratory, Cameron was better than most in this field. He and Curtin crossed paths several times during the campaign, and shared the platform at a Philadelphia meeting alongside Geary and General Ambrose Burnside. The Republican campaign was highlighted by the August Soldiers and Sailors Convention in Pittsburgh, with the main speaker being General Benjamin F. Butler of Massachusetts.

In the state elections held in October, Geary was elected, and the Republicans gained a combined majority of over 30 seats in the houses of the legislature, assuring them that they had the votes to replace Cowan. With Republicans holding 84 seats out of 133 in the 1867 legislature, a candidate needed 43 Republican votes to gain the party's endorsement, and likely the senatorship, since it was unusual for legislators to defy their party. With the 1866 elections meaning that the legislature would be dominated by the Republicans, not even the most optimistic Democratic newspaper saw a path for their party to win the seat.

== Maneuvering ==
Following the October elections, Cameron and Curtin were the frontrunners, but a number of other Republican political figures were spoken of for the Senate seat. Most prominent was Thaddeus Stevens, whose vocal opposition to the Johnson administration had captured the imagination of many in the Pennsylvania Republican Party. However, Stevens's age (74 at the time of the election), lack of a political organization outside his home county of Lancaster, and the fact that he was deemed indispensable in the federal House of Representatives meant he was unlikely to emerge even as a compromise candidate. Other contenders, each of whom had only minimal, regional support, were former U.S. speaker of the House Galusha Grow, representatives James K. Moorhead and Thomas Williams, and the secretary of the United States Senate, John W. Forney. More was at stake than the Senate seat, at least for Cameron and Curtin; the winner would control the state Republican Party, with the loser lacking office and influence.

There was bitterness after the state elections between the two main contenders; one defeated legislative candidate accused the Cameron faction of allying with the Democrats to beat him. McClure, the state party chair, tried to secure the vote of newly elected state representative Frederick S. Stumbaugh by getting the local party in his home county of Franklin to instruct him to vote for Curtin, but Stumbaugh refused to recognize the instructions as binding. Many local papers predicted Curtin's election, but the large metropolitan dailies did not. Former president James Buchanan, remembering unlikely victories by Cameron in the past, suspected he would be returned to the Senate. Cameron gained the support of Curtin's 1863 campaign manager, Wayne MacVeagh, perhaps for reasons having nothing to do with politics, as in 1866 MacVeagh married Cameron's youngest daughter, and MacVeagh's followers in the legislature voted for Cameron in the caucus.

== Final days and election ==
As part of his Christmas 1866 greetings to Butler, Cameron wrote, "I expect and intend to win". Cameron won a victory when Governor-elect Geary, who had given the impression his cabinet would be above faction, appointed a close friend of Cameron, Benjamin H. Brewster, as state attorney general. L. Kauffman, a Stevens supporter, wrote to the congressman, "Why did he not hold up the appointment until after the contest for the Speakership? But it is done and we must fight." As it became clear Stumbaugh would support Cameron, Stevens wrote him a bitter letter stating that Stumbaugh could not have been elected without his aid. McClure, in his memoirs, deemed Stumbaugh one of 3 "monuments of perfidy" whom he named as traitors to the Curtin cause, and among 21 legislators who he said had promised to vote for Curtin but had not.

Nevertheless, Curtin was still seen as the frontrunner, with his supporter, Matthew Quay, the favorite to become speaker of the state House of Representatives. Control of the speakership and its powers to assign members to committees would likely assure Curtin's victory, and his rivals combined to try to defeat Quay. Cameron hoped a Quay defeat would lead to his victory, while Stevens and Grow wanted a deadlock that might be resolved with a compromise candidate. According to Quay biographer James A. Kehl, "with a little maneuvering by Cameron, the combination of anti-Curtin forces united behind [John P.] Glass and elected him. Without realizing the consequences of their actions, they enabled Cameron to harvest all the fruits of victory for himself, because Glass was secretly 'his man'." When the legislature convened in early January, Glass was easily elected over the Democratic candidate. Glass used his control of committee assignments to influence supporters of Stevens, Grow and other minor candidates. Stevens saw these events as presaging Curtin's defeat, writing, "I believe the latter's [Curtin's] friends consider the game up for him."

The days before the Republican caucus on January 10, 1867, saw increasing depression in the Curtin camp. On January 7, Cameron wrote to a friend,

I am I think going to win. Indeed, I do not see how I can be defeated ... Forney and Stevens and Grow all believed the fight would be so violent and so evenly divided between Curtin and me, that one of them would get the prize—and each believed himself the fortunate expectant, but my strength was developed so early that they found Curtin was beaten—and now they are combining against me. I feel certain they will be disappointed again. They are all to be here, in person, and for the next 4 days I will be the best abused man in 'there parts'. I like a fight, and if I don't whip them, they will have more luck than they merit.

Anxious to head off any possible revolt and alliance with the Democrats to elect a senator, Cameron's son J. Donald "Don" Cameron, his father's campaign manager, met with Quay, asking him to move to make the nomination unanimous after the caucus vote, and offering amnesty for Curtin supporters. Quay conferred with Curtin, who agreed to the proposal. Nevertheless, a few days before the caucus, Stevens, Grow and Curtin met with Forney in his hotel suite to try to deny Cameron the election. The only plan they could come up with was an alliance with the Democrats, which Curtin refused to consider.

The caucus took place in Harrisburg on the evening of January 10. Cameron was nominated for Senate on the first ballot with 46 votes, with 23 for Curtin, 7 for Stevens, and 5 for Grow. Two senators, both from Lancaster County, did not vote. At Quay's motion, the nomination was made unanimous. The previous day, Democrats had convened to select their caucus's candidate. State Senator William A. Wallace received votes, as did Chief Justice George Washington Woodward of the Supreme Court of Pennsylvania, but Cowan received a majority of the vote and his nomination was made unanimous.

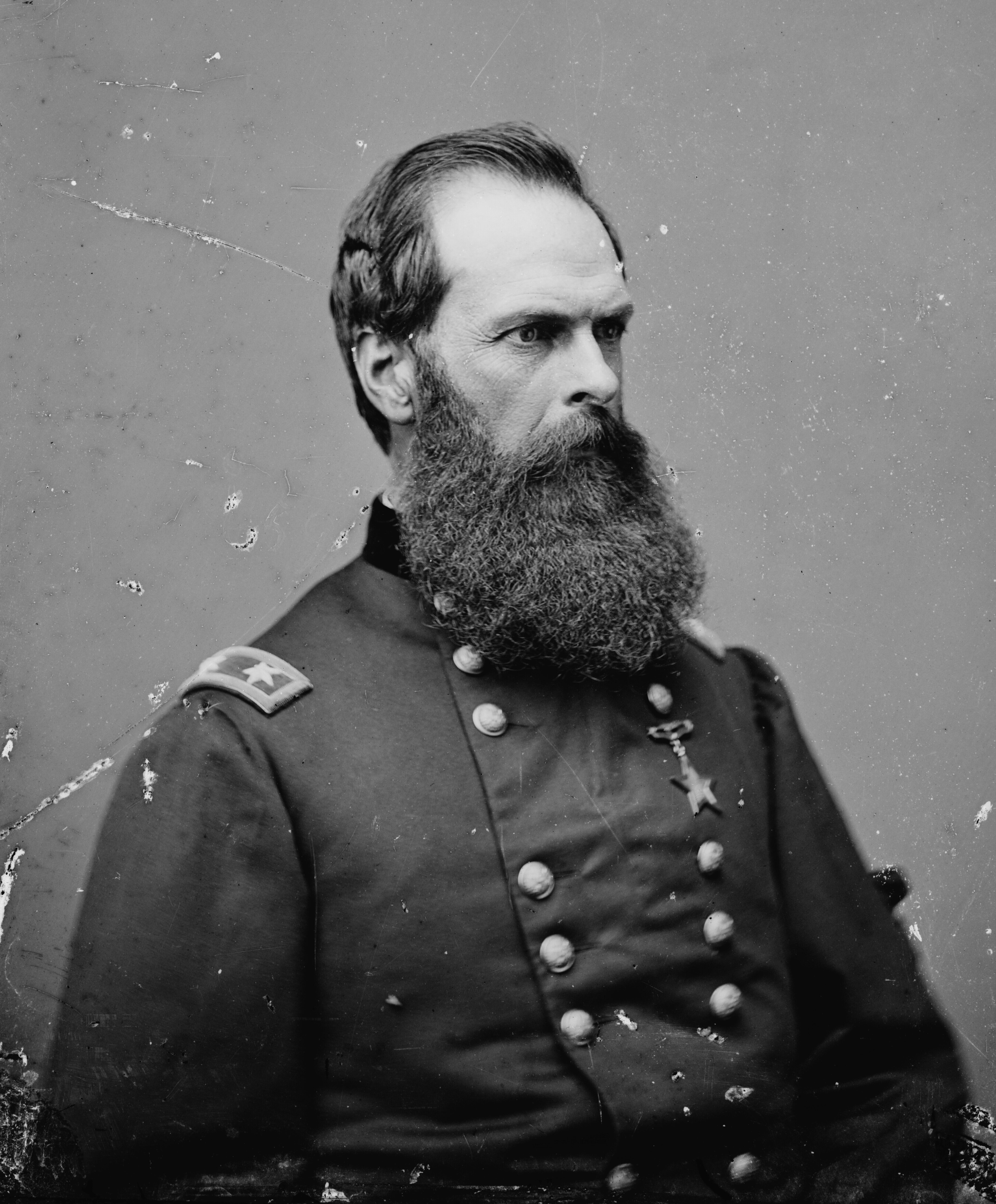
John W. Geary was elected Pennsylvania's governor in 1866.

On January 14, the two houses of the legislature voted. Cameron initially received 62 votes in the House to Cowan's 37, and 19 votes in the Senate to Cowan's 10, but at the joint assembly of the houses the following day, three senators who had been unable to vote asked leave to cast their ballots, with one for Cameron and two for Cowan, making the final Senate tally 20 votes to 12. One Democratic representative voted for Cameron; one Republican representative for Cowan. With both houses having cast a majority vote for Cameron, he was declared elected at the joint assembly. In a speech after his election, Cameron stated that the vote vindicated him against the accusations he had been subjected to over the years, called President Johnson a traitor, and called for a higher protective tariff for the manufacturers of Pennsylvania. Curtin, whose term as governor had expired, departed for Europe. There were accusations of corruption in Cameron's election, by Stevens, McClure and others. An investigative committee, appointed by Speaker Glass and led by Representative Stumbaugh, found no evidence of it.

== Aftermath ==
According to his biographer, Paul Kahan, Cameron's victory "represented a decisive turning point in Pennsylvania's political history. Cameron not only won the Senate seat, he also crushed Curtin and McClure's bid to control Pennsylvania's Republican Party. While Cameron still faced challenges to his power, moving forward he was generally recognized as the political 'boss' of Pennsylvania." Ambitious young politicians, such as Matthew Quay, drifted into the Cameron camp, with the alternative being political oblivion. With many of his opponents defeated, converted or forced from politics, by the time Cameron was re-elected to the Senate in 1873, almost every Republican in the legislature was a "Cameron man".

According to William H. Egle in his essay on his second term as governor, Curtin's great popularity with former Union soldiers "seemed to have but little weight with the political demagogues who controlled the actions of the General Assembly of the State. The overwhelming sentiment of the people succumbed to base political strategy." Many rank-and-file Republicans were upset at the wartime governor's defeat by what they feared was a Cameron cabal, and reacted by denying Cameron the chair of Pennsylvania's delegation to the 1868 Republican National Convention. The state convention required the delegation to vote to have Curtin named as Ulysses S. Grant's running mate, but the vice presidential nomination went to Schuyler Colfax of Indiana. Grant appointed Curtin as minister to Russia in 1869, meaning the former governor was absent from Pennsylvania as Cameron consolidated his power.

After resigning from his post in St. Petersburg, Curtin supported the Democratic and Liberal Republican candidate for president in 1872, Horace Greeley. He remained with the Democratic Party, serving three terms in Congress from 1881 to 1887, after which he practiced law in Bellefonte, Pennsylvania, and died in 1894. Cowan was nominated as minister to Austria by Johnson, but was never confirmed by the Senate. He returned to his law practice in Greensburg, Pennsylvania, and died in 1878.

Cameron was re-elected to the Senate in 1873, and resigned in 1877 to allow his son Don Cameron to take the seat, which he held for a further twenty years. Simon Cameron died in 1889 at the age of 90. The Cameron machine dominated politics in Pennsylvania for a half-century after 1867, with control of it passing to Matthew Quay, who became a senator himself, and then to Senator Boies Penrose.

== See also ==
- 1866–67 United States Senate elections

== Bibliography ==
- Akagi, Roy H. (1924). "The Pennsylvania Constitution of 1838". The Pennsylvania Magazine of History and Biography. 48 (4): 301–333. JSTOR 20086550.
- Bradley, Erwin Stanley (1966). Simon Cameron, Lincoln's Secretary of War: A Political Biography. University of Pennsylvania Press. LCCN 65020756.
- Bybee, Jay S. (Winter 1997). "Ulysses at the Mast: Democracy, Federalism, and the Sirens' Song of the Seventeenth Amendment". Northwestern University Law Review. 91 (2): 500–572.
- Egle, William Henry (1896). "Curtin's Second Term". In Egle, William Henry (ed.). Life and Times of Andrew Gregg Curtin. The Thompson Publishing Company. pp. 169–207. OCLC 3533098.
- Furniss, Jack (April 2017). "Andrew Curtin and the Politics of Union". The Pennsylvania Magazine of History and Biography. 141 (2): 145–176. doi:10.5215/pennmaghistbio.141.2.0145. JSTOR 10.5215/pennmaghistbio.141.2.0145. S2CID 152053392.
- Kahan, Paul (2016). Amiable Scoundrel: Simon Cameron, Lincoln's Scandalous Secretary of War. University of Nebraska Press. ISBN 978-1-61234-814-8.
- Kehl, James A. (1981). Boss Rule in the Gilded Age: Matt Quay of Pennsylvania. University of Pittsburgh Press. ISBN 978-0-8229-3426-4.
- Kelley, Brooks M. (October 1963). "Simon Cameron and the Senatorial Nomination of 1867". The Pennsylvania Magazine of History and Biography. 87 (4): 375–392. JSTOR 20089650.
- Kelley, Brooks M. (January 1966). "Fossildom, Old Fogeyism, and Red Tape". The Pennsylvania Magazine of History and Biography. 90 (1): 93–114. JSTOR 20089871.
- Schiller, Wendy J.; Stewart III, Charles (2015). Electing the Senate: Indirect Democracy Before the Seventeenth Amendment (eBook ed.). Princeton University Press. ISBN 978-0-691-16316-1.
- Stewart, John D. II (January 1972). "The Great Winnebago Chieftain: Simon Cameron's Rise to Power 1860–1867". Pennsylvania History: A Journal of Mid-Atlantic Studies. 39 (1): 20–39. JSTOR 27771991.

Preceded by 1861	Pennsylvania U.S. Senate election (Class III); 1867	Succeeded by 1873
