= 1876–77 United States Senate elections =

- Dates vary by state (And other dates for special elections)
- Class 2

26 of the 76 seats in the United States Senate (with special elections) 39 seats needed for a majority
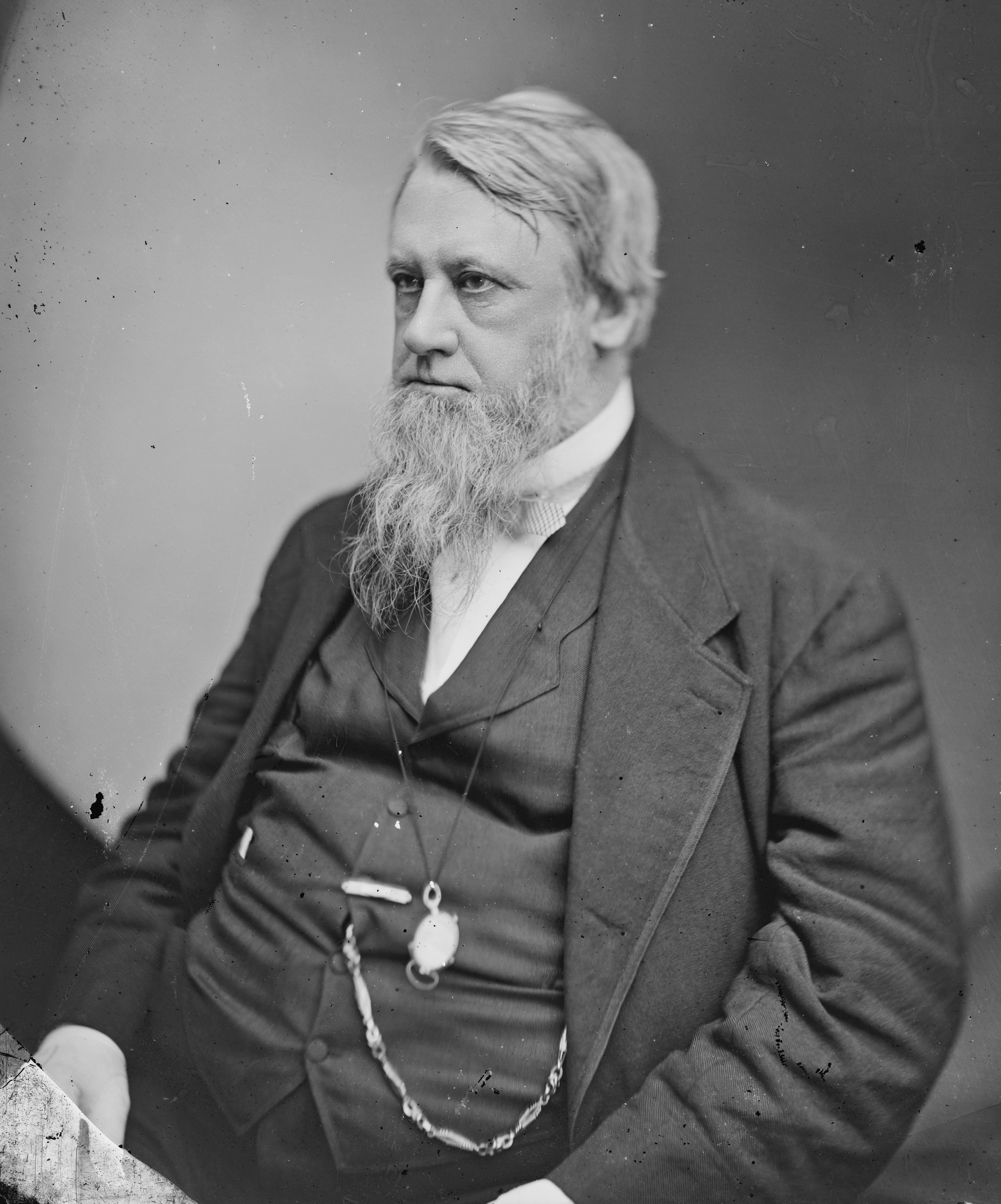

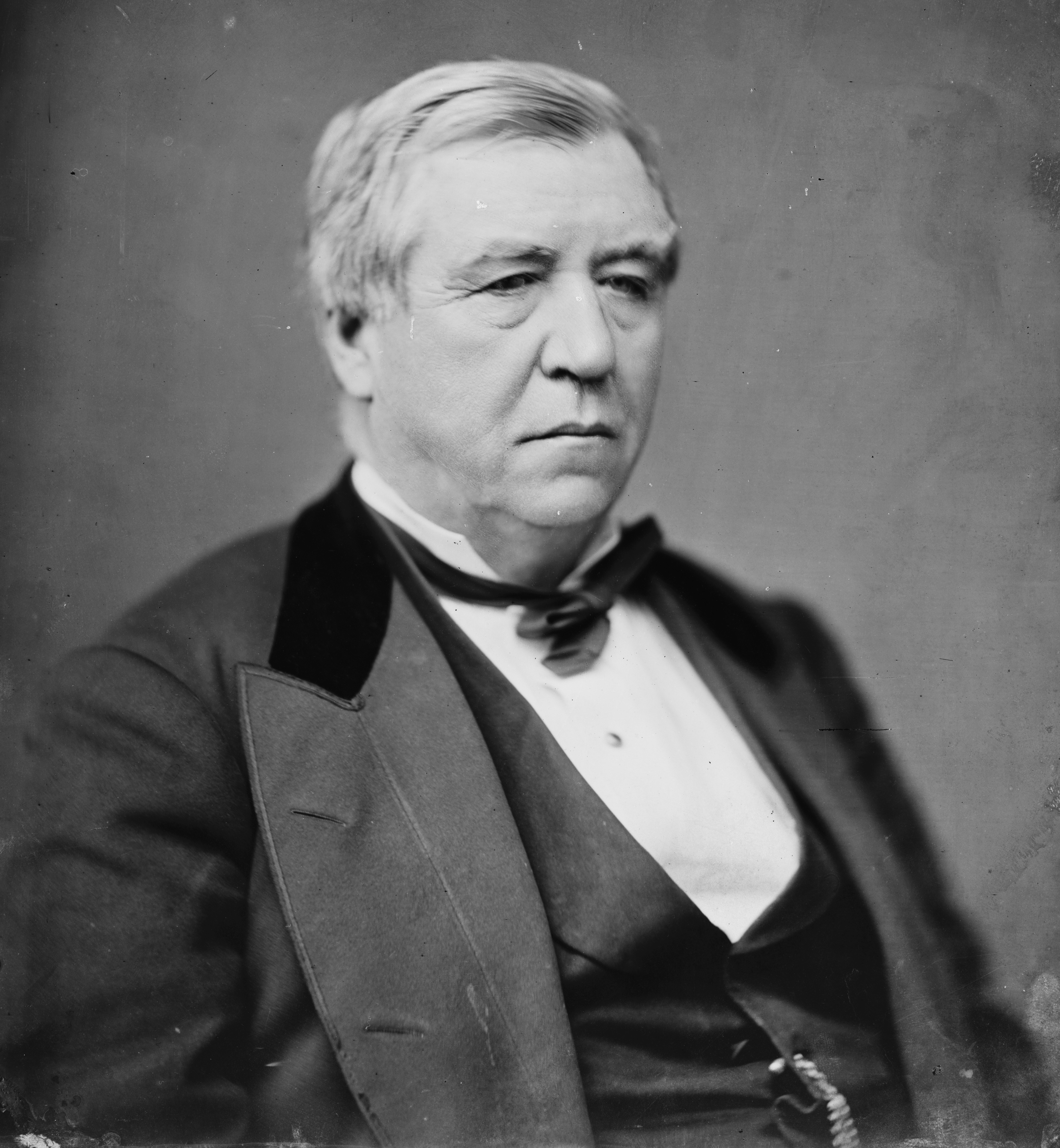
	Majority party	Minority party
Leader	Henry B. Anthony (Note: as Republican Conference Chair)	John W. Stevenson (Note: as Democratic Caucus Chair) (retired)
Party	Republican	Democratic
Leader since	March 4, 1863	March 4, 1873
Leader's seat	Rhode Island	Kentucky
Seats before	45	30
Seats won	11	14
Seats after	39	35
Seat change	▼6	▲5
Seats up	17	9
	Third party	Fourth party
Party	Anti-Monopoly	Independent
Seats before	1	0
Seats won	0	1
Seats after	1	1
Seat change	Steady	▲1
Seats up	0	0
- Results of the elections: Democratic gain Democratic hold Republican gain Republican hold Independent gain
Majority Party before election
Republican
Elected Majority Party
Republican

The 1876–77 United States Senate elections were held on various dates in various states, coinciding with Rutherford B. Hayes's narrow election as president due to the Compromise of 1877. As these U.S. Senate elections were prior to the ratification of the Seventeenth Amendment in 1913, senators were chosen by state legislatures. Senators were elected over a wide range of time throughout 1876 and 1877, and a seat may have been filled months late or remained vacant due to legislative deadlock. In these elections, terms were up for the senators in Class 2.

Although the Republican Party maintained their Senate majority, the Democratic Party gained five seats.

== Results summary ==
Senate party division, 45th Congress (1877–1879)

- Majority party: Republican (39)
- Minority party: Democratic (35)
- Other parties: Anti-Monopoly (1), Independent (1)
- Total seats: 76

== Change in Senate composition ==
=== Before the elections ===
After the November 15, 1876 elections in the new state of Colorado.

D_{8}	D_{7}	D_{6}	D_{5}	D_{4}	D_{3}	D_{2}	D_{1}		
D_{9}	D_{10}	D_{11}	D_{12}	D_{13}	D_{14}	D_{15}	D_{16}	D_{17}	D_{18}
D_{28} Retired	D_{27} Retired	D_{26} Ran	D_{25} Ran	D_{24} Ran	D_{23} Ran	D_{22} Ran	D_{21}	D_{20}	D_{19}
D_{29} Retired	D_{30} Retired	AM_{1}	R_{45} Retired	R_{44} Retired	R_{43} Retired	R_{42} Retired	R_{41} Unknown	R_{40} Unknown	R_{39} Unknown
Majority →									R_{39} Unknown
R_{29} Ran	R_{30} Ran	R_{31} Ran	R_{32} Ran	R_{33} Ran	R_{34} Ran	R_{35} Ran	R_{36} Ran	R_{37} Ran	R_{38} Ran
R_{28}	R_{27}	R_{26}	R_{25}	R_{24}	R_{23}	R_{22}	R_{21}	R_{20}	R_{19}
R_{9}	R_{10}	R_{11}	R_{12}	R_{13}	R_{14}	R_{15}	R_{16}	R_{17}	R_{18}
R_{8}	R_{7}	R_{6}	R_{5}	R_{4}	R_{3}	R_{2}	R_{1}		

=== After the elections ===
D_{8}	D_{7}	D_{6}	D_{5}	D_{4}	D_{3}	D_{2}	D_{1}		
D_{9}	D_{10}	D_{11}	D_{12}	D_{13}	D_{14}	D_{15}	D_{16}	D_{17}	D_{18}
D_{28} Hold	D_{27} Hold	D_{26} Hold	D_{25} Re-elected	D_{24} Re-elected	D_{23} Re-elected	D_{22} Re-elected	D_{21}	D_{20}	D_{19}
D_{29} Hold	D_{30} Hold	D_{31} Gain	D_{32} Gain	D_{33} Gain	D_{34} Gain	D_{35} Gain	I_{1} Gain	AM_{1}	R_{39} Hold
Majority →									R_{39} Hold
R_{29} Re-elected	R_{30} Re-elected	R_{31} Re-elected	R_{32} Re-elected	R_{33} Re-elected	R_{34} Hold	R_{35} Hold	R_{36} Hold	R_{37} Hold	R_{38} Hold
R_{28}	R_{27}	R_{26}	R_{25}	R_{24}	R_{23}	R_{22}	R_{21}	R_{20}	R_{19}
R_{9}	R_{10}	R_{11}	R_{12}	R_{13}	R_{14}	R_{15}	R_{16}	R_{17}	R_{18}
R_{8}	R_{7}	R_{6}	R_{5}	R_{4}	R_{3}	R_{2}	R_{1}		

Key:

AM_{#}	Anti-Monopoly Party
D_{#}	Democratic
I_{#}	Independent
R_{#}	Republican

== Race summaries ==
=== Special elections during the 44th Congress ===
In these elections, the winners were seated during 1876 or in 1877 before March 4; ordered by election date.

State	Incumbent			Results	Candidates
State	Senator	Party	Electoral history	Results	Candidates
Louisiana (Class 3)	Vacant			Senate had declined to seat rival claimants William L. McMillen and P. B. S. Pinchback. Senator elected January 12, 1876. Democratic gain.	▌ ✓ James B. Eustis (Democratic); [data missing]
Connecticut (Class 3)	James E. English	Democratic	1875 (appointed)	Interim appointee lost special election. New senator elected May 17, 1876. Democratic hold.	▌ ✓ William Barnum (Democratic) 150 H/17 S; ▌ Henry Baldwin Harrison (Republican) 81 H/3 S; ▌ James E. English (Democratic) 5 H/1 S; ▌ Charles Roberts Ingersoll (Democratic) 2 H/0 S
Colorado (Class 2)	None (new state)			Colorado admitted to the Union August 1, 1876. First senator elected November 15, 1876. Republican gain. Winner was also elected to the next term; see below.	▌ ✓ Henry M. Teller (Republican); [data missing]
Colorado (Class 3)	None (new state)			Colorado admitted to the Union August 1, 1876. First senator elected November 15, 1876. Republican gain.	▌ ✓ Jerome B. Chaffee (Republican); [data missing]
Tennessee (Class 1)	David M. Key	Democratic	1875 (appointed)	Interim appointee lost special election. New senator elected January 19, 1877 on the 74th ballot. Democratic hold.	▌ ✓ James E. Bailey (Democratic) 55; ▌David M. Key (Democratic) 38; ▌W. B. Bates (Unknown) 7
Maine (Class 2)	James G. Blaine	Republican	1876 (appointed)	Interim appointee elected January 17, 1877. Winner was also elected to the next term; see below.	▌ ✓ James G. Blaine (Republican) 139; ▌William P. Haines (Unknown) 33
West Virginia (Class 1)	Samuel Price	Democratic	1876 (appointed)	Interim appointee lost special election. New senator elected January 26, 1877 on the 5th ballot. Democratic hold.	▌ ✓ Frank Hereford (Democratic) 70; ▌Samuel Price (Democratic) 10; ▌Henry S. Walker (Unknown) 4; ▌R. F. Dennis (Unknown) 1; Other 1 vote

=== Races leading to the 45th Congress ===
In these regular elections, the winners were elected for the term beginning March 4, 1877; ordered by state.

All of the elections involved the Class 2 seats.

State	Incumbent			Results	Candidates
State	Senator	Party	Electoral history	Results	Candidates
Alabama	George Goldthwaite	Democratic	1870	Incumbent retired. New senator elected in 1876. Democratic hold.	▌ ✓ John T. Morgan (Democratic); [data missing]
Arkansas	Powell Clayton	Republican	1870	Incumbent retired. New senator elected January 16, 1877. Democratic gain.	▌ ✓ Augustus Garland (Democratic) 113 (Note: "Eighteen Republicans voted for Garland, of whom five were colored."); ▌T. D. W. Youlee (Unknown) 8
Colorado	Henry M. Teller	Republican	1876 (new state)	Incumbent re-elected in 1876 or 1877.	▌ ✓ Henry M. Teller (Republican); [data missing]
Delaware	Eli Saulsbury	Democratic	1870	Incumbent re-elected in 1876.	▌ ✓ Eli Saulsbury (Democratic); [data missing]
Georgia	Thomas M. Norwood	Democratic	1871 (readmission)	Incumbent lost re-election. New senator elected January 26, 1877 on the fourth ballot. Democratic hold.	▌ ✓ Benjamin Harvey Hill (Democratic) 114; ▌Thomas M. Norwood (Democratic) 85; ▌Herschel V. Johnson (Democratic) 6; ▌James M. Smith (Democratic) 5; ▌Charles J. Jenkins (Democratic) 1
Illinois	John A. Logan	Republican	1870–71	Incumbent lost re-election. New senator elected January 25, 1877 on the fortieth ballot. Independent gain.	▌ ✓ David Davis (Independent) 101; ▌Charles B. Lawrence (Unknown) 94; ▌John C. Haines (Republican) 3; ▌John A. Logan (Republican) 1; Other 1
Iowa	George G. Wright	Republican	1870	Incumbent retired. New senator elected January 19, 1876. Republican hold.	▌ ✓ Samuel J. Kirkwood (Republican) 108; ▌Shepard Leffler (Unknown) 37
Kansas	James M. Harvey	Republican	1874 (special)	Incumbent lost re-election. New elected January 31, 1877 on the seventeenth ballot. Republican hold.	▌ ✓ Preston B. Plumb (Republican) 89; ▌David P. Lowe (Republican) 63; ▌John Martin (Republican) 8; ▌Thomas A. Osborn (Republican) eliminated; ▌James M. Harvey (Republican) eliminated; Others 3
Kentucky	John W. Stevenson	Democratic	1869	Incumbent retired. New senator elected January 18, 1876. Democratic hold.	▌ ✓ James B. Beck (Democratic) 106; ▌ William H. Wadsworth (Republican) 14; ▌ Preston (Unknown) 4; ▌ J. Proctor Knott (Democratic) 1
Louisiana	Joseph R. West	Republican	1870–71	Incumbent retired. New senator elected January 10, 1877. Republican hold.	▌ ✓ William P. Kellogg (Republican); [data missing]
Maine	James G. Blaine	Republican	1876 (appointed)	Interim appointee elected January 16, 1877. Winner also elected to finish the term; see above.	▌ ✓ James G. Blaine (Republican) 139; ▌William P. Haines (Unknown) 33
Massachusetts	George S. Boutwell	Republican	1873 (special)	Incumbent lost renomination. New senator elected in 1877. Republican hold.	▌ ✓ George F. Hoar (Republican) 146; ▌Josiah G. Abbott (Democratic) 62; ▌George S. Boutwell (Republican) 47; ▌Alexander H. Rice (Republican) 19; ▌Alexander H. Bullock (Republican) 1; ▌Julius H. Seelye (Independent) 1; ▌Paul A. Chadbourne (Republican) 1
Michigan	Thomas W. Ferry	Republican	1871	Incumbent re-elected in 1877.	▌ ✓ Thomas W. Ferry (Republican); [data missing]
Minnesota	William Windom	Republican	1870 (appointed); 1871	Incumbent re-elected in 1877.	▌ ✓ William Windom (Republican); [data missing]
Mississippi	James L. Alcorn	Republican	1870	Incumbent retired or lost re-election. New senator elected in 1876. Democratic gain.	▌ ✓ Lucius Q. C. Lamar (Democratic); [data missing]
Nebraska	Phineas Hitchcock	Republican	1870	Incumbent lost re-election. New senator elected in 1877. Republican hold.	▌ ✓ Alvin Saunders (Republican); ▌Phineas Hitchcock (Republican); [data missing]
New Hampshire	Aaron H. Cragin	Republican	1864; 1870	Incumbent retired or lost re-election. New senator elected in 1876. Republican hold.	▌ ✓ Edward H. Rollins (Republican); [data missing]
New Jersey	Frederick T. Frelinghuysen	Republican	1870–71	Incumbent lost re-election. New senator elected January 24, 1877. Democratic gain.	▌ ✓ John R. McPherson (Democratic) 41; ▌Cortlandt Parker (Republican) 18; ▌George M. Robeson (Republican) 11; ▌Frederick T. Frelinghuysen (Republican) 10; ▌William Walter Phelps (Republican) 1
North Carolina	Matt W. Ransom	Democratic	1872 (special)	Incumbent re-elected in 1876.	▌ ✓ Matt W. Ransom (Democratic); [data missing]
Oregon	James K. Kelly	Democratic	1870	Incumbent retired. Democratic hold.	▌ ✓ La Fayette Grover (Democratic); [data missing]
Rhode Island	Henry B. Anthony	Republican	1858; 1864; 1870	Incumbent re-elected in 1876.	▌ ✓ Henry B. Anthony (Republican); [data missing]
South Carolina	Thomas J. Robertson	Republican	1868 (readmission); 1870	Incumbent retired. New senator elected in 1876. Democratic gain.	▌ ✓ Matthew Butler (Democratic); [data missing]
Tennessee	Henry Cooper	Democratic	1870–71	Incumbent retired. New senator elected January 10, 1877. Democratic hold.	▌ ✓ Isham G. Harris (Democratic) 77; ▌L. L. Hawkins (Unknown) 19; ▌James D. Porter (Democratic) 1; ▌Horace Harrison (Republican) 1; ▌W. B. Bates (Unknown) 1
Texas	Morgan C. Hamilton	Republican	1870 (readmission); 1871	Incumbent retired. New senator elected May 5, 1876 on third ballot. Democratic gain.	▌ ✓ Richard Coke (Democratic) 68; ▌John Ireland (Democratic) 49
Virginia	John W. Johnston	Democratic	1870 (readmission); 1871	Incumbent re-elected in 1877.	▌ ✓ John W. Johnston (Democratic); [data missing]
West Virginia	Henry G. Davis	Democratic	1871	Incumbent re-elected January 26, 1877 on the fourth ballot.	▌ ✓ Henry G. Davis (Democratic) 60; ▌Charles J. Faulkner (Democratic) 19; ▌Gideon D. Camden (Democratic) 3; ▌John Brannon (Unknown) 2; ▌John J. Davis (Democratic) 1; Other 1

=== Elections during the 45th Congress ===
In these elections, the winners were elected in 1877 after March 4.

State	Incumbent			Results	Candidates
State	Senator	Party	Electoral history	Results	Candidates
Pennsylvania (Class 3)	Simon Cameron	Republican	1857; 1861 (resigned); 1867; 1873	Incumbent resigned March 12, 1877. New senator elected March 20, 1877. Republican hold.	▌ ✓ J. Donald Cameron (Republican); ▌Andrew H. Dill (Democratic); ▌Hiester Clymer (Democratic); ▌Andrew G. Curtin (Democratic); ▌John Jackson (Democratic)
Ohio (Class 3)	John Sherman	Republican	1861 (special); 1866; 1872	Incumbent resigned March 8, 1877 to become U.S. Secretary of the Treasury. New senator elected March 21, 1877. Republican hold.	▌ ✓ Stanley Matthews (Republican) 82; ▌Alfred Ginther (Unknown) 6; ▌Frank H. Hurd (Democratic) 1; Blank 34

== Pennsylvania (special) ==
The special election in Pennsylvania was held March 20, 1877.

Republican Senator Simon Cameron had been elected to the United States Senate by the Pennsylvania General Assembly, consisting of the House of Representatives and the Senate, in 1867 and was re-elected in 1873. Sen. Cameron resigned on March 12, 1877.

Following the resignation of Simon Cameron, the Pennsylvania General Assembly convened on March 20, 1877, to elect a new Senator to fill the vacancy. Former United States Secretary of War J. Donald Cameron, Simon Cameron's son, was elected to complete his father's term, set to expire on March 4, 1879. The results of the vote of both houses combined are as follows:

Pennsylvania Results
Party	Candidate	Votes	%
Republican	J. Donald Cameron	147	58.57
Democratic	Andrew H. Dill	92	36.65
Democratic	Hiester Clymer	1	0.40
Democratic	Andrew G. Curtin	1	0.40
Democratic	John Jackson	1	0.40
N/A	Not voting	9	3.59
Totals		251	100.00%

== Texas ==
1876 United States Senate election in Texas
- May 3–5, 1876

Needed to win: Majority of votes cast jointly by the Legislature
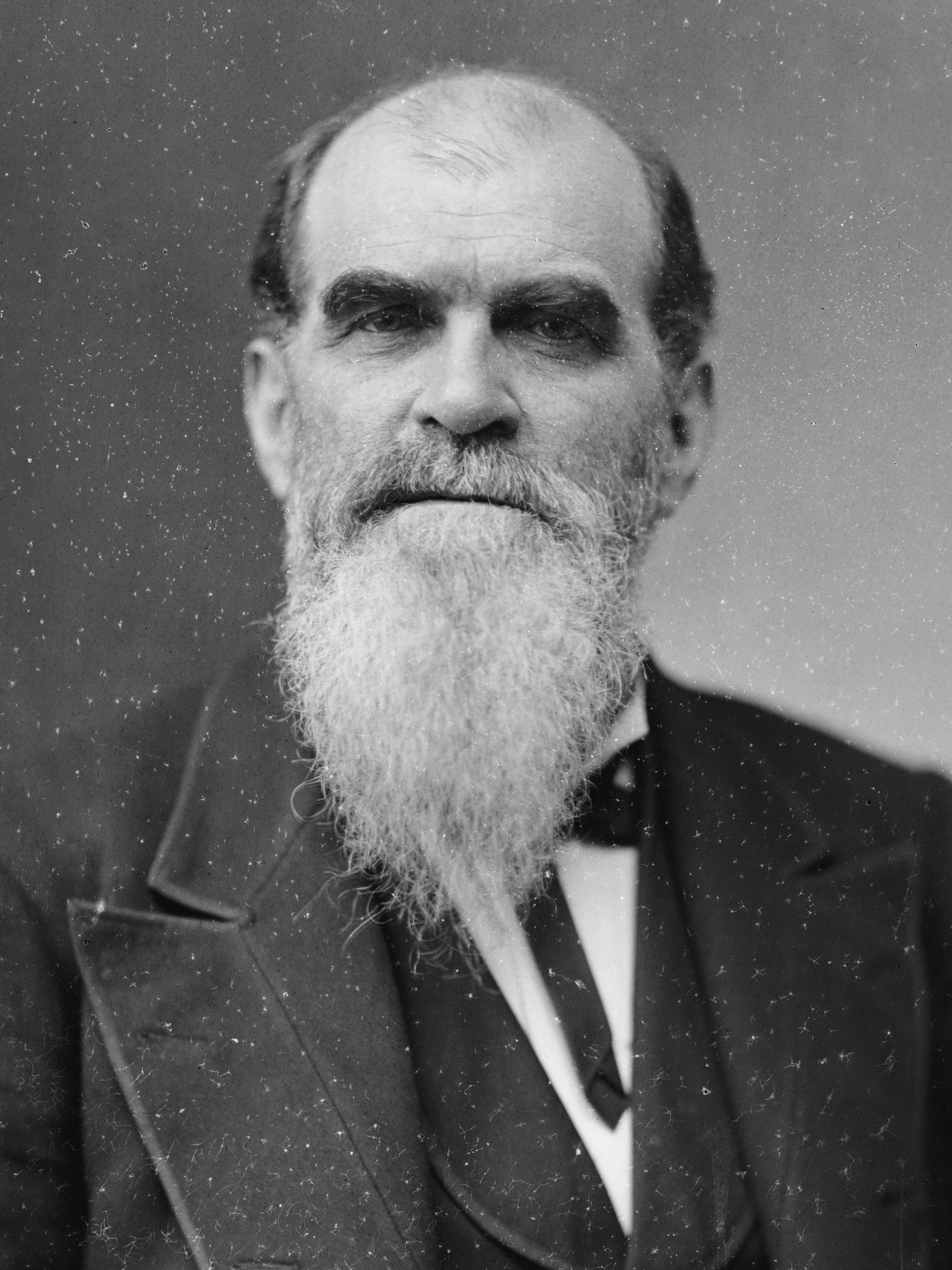

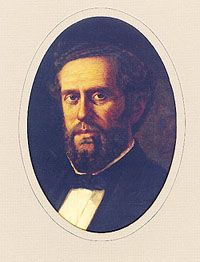
Candidate	Richard Coke	John Ireland
Party	Democratic	Democratic
First ballot	49 votes 40.2%	39 votes 32.0%
Third ballot	68 votes 58.1%	49 votes 41.9%
U.S. senator before election
Morgan C. Hamilton
Republican
Elected U.S. Senator
Richard Coke
Democratic

Incumbent Republican Morgan C. Hamilton did not run for re-election. Since his initial election in 1870, the Democratic Party had taken control of the Texas Legislature, ensuring that a Democrat would replace him. Incumbent governor Richard Coke defeated former Texas Supreme Court justice John Ireland on the third ballot. U.S. Representative John Hancock and former governor Fletcher Stockdale also ran, but they dropped out after the second round of balloting.

1876 United States Senate election in Texas first ballot
Party	Candidate	Votes	%
Democratic	Richard Coke	49	40.2%
Democratic	John Ireland	39	32.0%
Democratic	John Hancock	29	23.8%
Democratic	Fletcher Stockdale	5	4.1%
Total votes		122	100.0%

1876 United States Senate election in Texas third ballot
Party	Candidate	Votes	%
Democratic	Richard Coke	68	58.1%
Democratic	John Ireland	49	41.9%
Total votes		117	100.0%
Democratic gain from Republican			

== West Virginia ==
=== West Virginia (special) ===
1877 United States Senate special election in West Virginia
- January 23–26, 1877

Needed to win: Majority of votes cast jointly by the Legislature
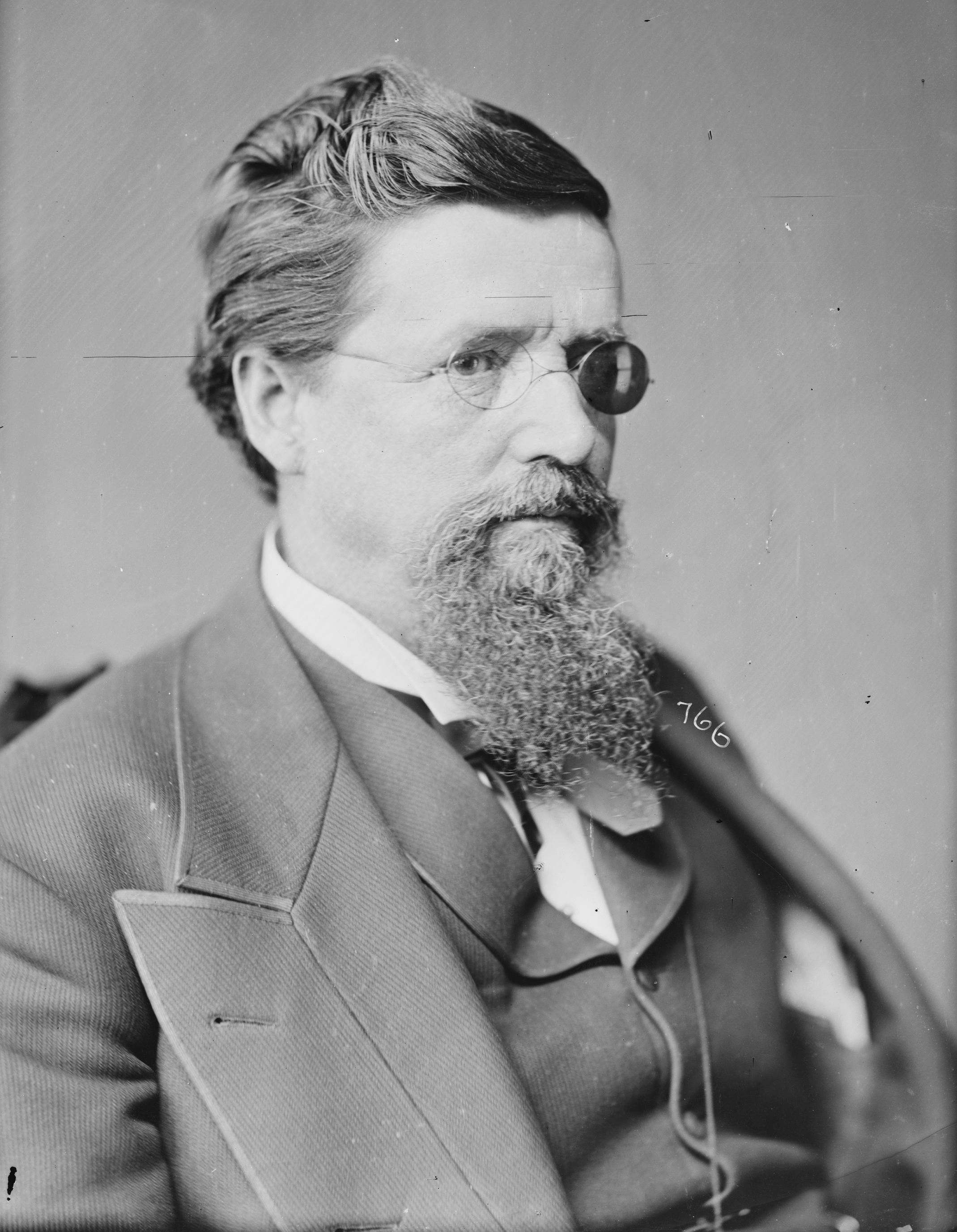

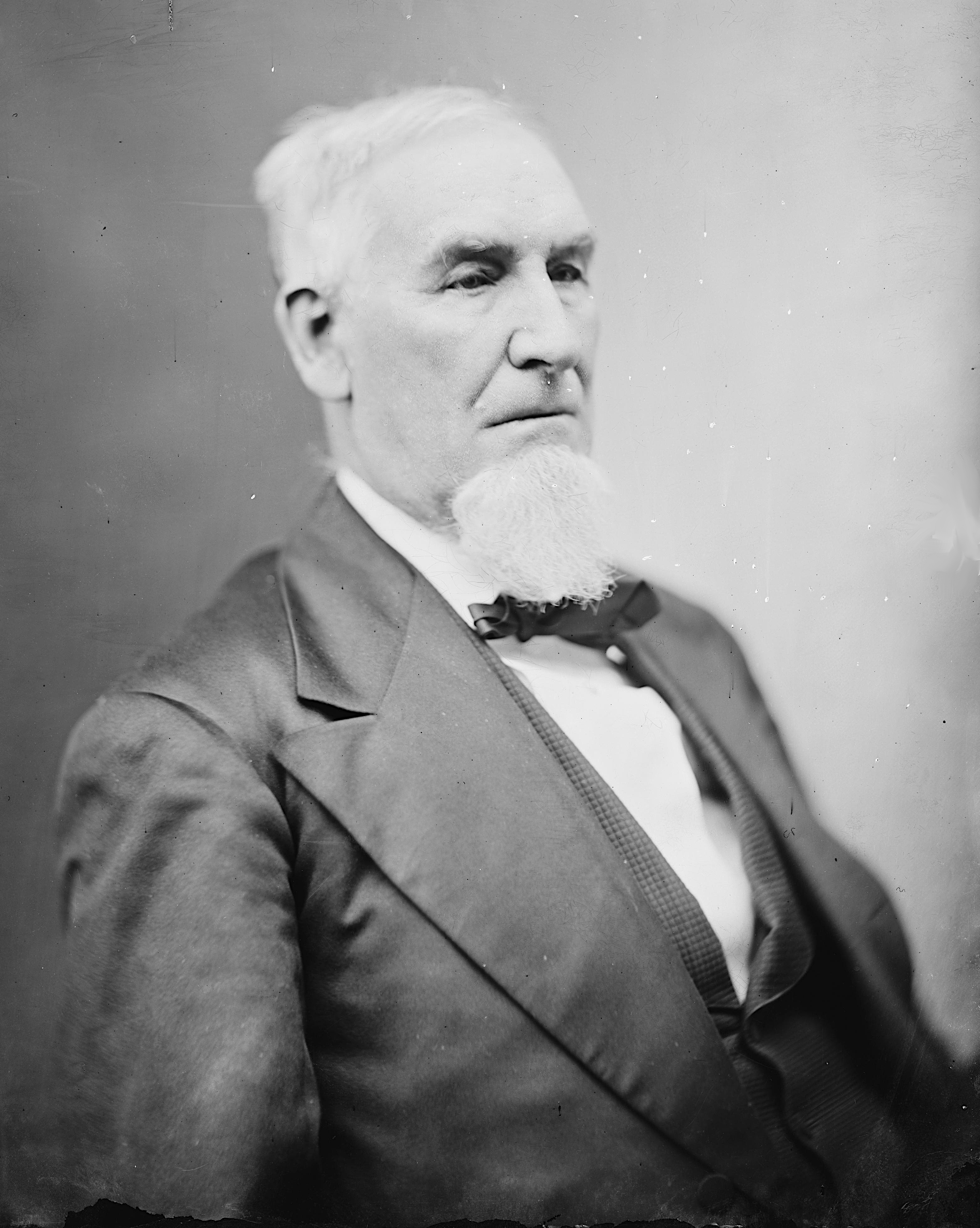

Candidate	Frank Hereford	Samuel Price	Henry S. Walker
Party	Democratic	Democratic	Democratic
First ballot	21 votes 24.1%	24 votes 27.6%	16 votes 18.4%
Fourth ballot	70 votes 81.4%	10 votes 11.6%	4 votes 4.7%
U.S. senator before election
Samuel Price
Democratic
Elected U.S. Senator
Frank Hereford
Democratic

First-term Democrat Allen T. Caperton died July 26, 1876, in his second year in office. Fellow-Democrat Samuel Price was appointed August 26, 1876 to continue the term, pending a special election in which he was a candidate. Price lost the election to Democratic congressman Frank Hereford January 26, 1877 on the fourth ballot.

Appointed incumbent Samuel Price and challengers Frank Hereford and Henry S. Walker, three prominent state Democrats, fought for the party's nomination over seven ballots and three sessions, without much movement in any direction. On January 26, with the Democrats unable to make a nomination, legislative Republicans broke the deadlock by throwing their support to Hereford on the floor.

Democratic nomination
Candidate	Ballots						
Candidate	1st	2nd	3rd	4th	5th	6th	7th
Frank Hereford	21	19	18	18	21	18	18
Samuel Price	20	20	21	19	20	13	16
Henry S. Walker	17	19	16	19	18	23	17
Scattered	7	8	9	6	4	6	13
Total	65	66	64	62	63	60	64
Needed to win	35						

House and Senate balloting
Party	Candidate	House		Senate	
Party	Candidate	Votes	%	Votes	%
Democratic	Frank Hereford	18	28.6	3	13.0
Democratic	Samuel Price	15	23.8	7	30.4
Democratic	Henry S. Walker	9	14.3	6	26.1
Republican	John S. Carlile	15	23.8	4	17.4
Democratic	Robert F. Dennis	2	3.2	3	13.0
Democratic	Ira J. McGinnis	1	1.6	0	0.0
Democratic	Thomas J. Farnsworth	1	1.6	0	0.0
Democratic	John B. Hoge	1	1.6	0	0.0
Democratic	William E. Arnold	1	1.6	0	0.0
Total		63	100	23	100
Needed to win		32	>50	12	>50

Joint Session balloting
Party	Candidate	Ballots			
Party	Candidate	1st	2nd	3rd	4th
Democratic	Frank Hereford	21	28	25	70
Democratic	Samuel Price	24	23	26	10
Democratic	Henry S. Walker	16	12	19	4
Democratic	James H. Ferguson	3	15	3	0
Democratic	Robert F. Dennis	6	6	7	1
Other candidates		17	3	7	1
Total		87	87	87	86
Needed to win		44	44	44	44

Hereford resigned from the House January 31, 1877, thereby qualifying for the Senate. He only finished the term and left office in 1881.

=== West Virginia (regular) ===
1877 United States Senate election in West Virginia
- January 23–26, 1877

Needed to win: Majority of votes cast jointly by the Legislature
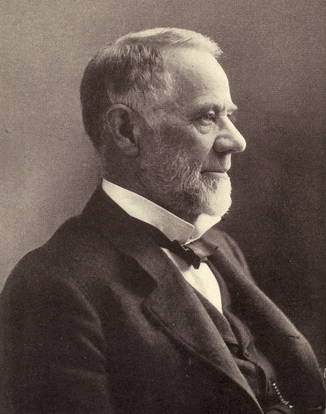

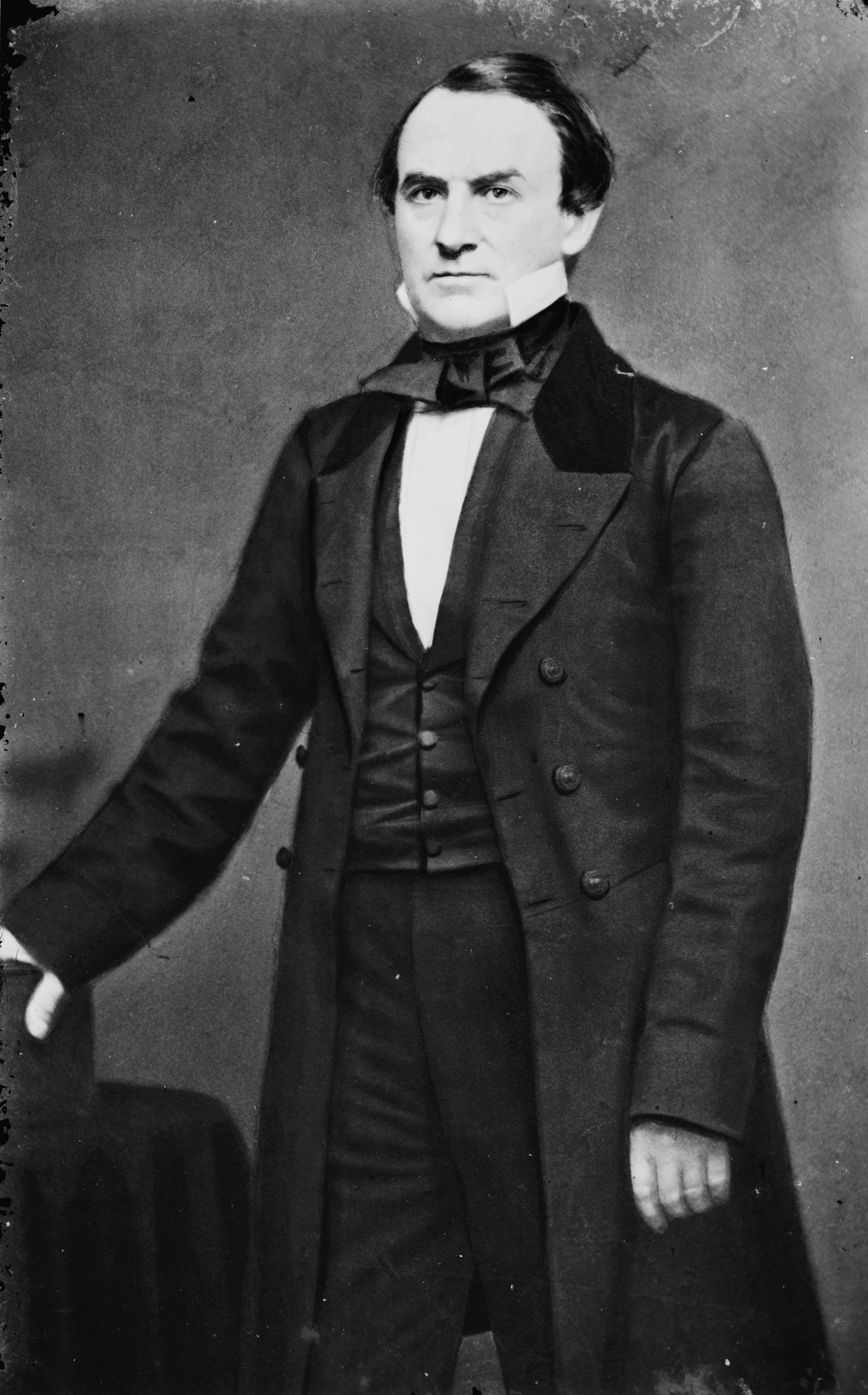
Candidate	Henry G. Davis	Charles J. Faulkner
Party	Democratic	Democratic
First ballot	24 votes 27.6%	24 votes 27.6%
Third ballot	60 votes 69.0%	19 votes 21.8%
U.S. senator before election
Henry G. Davis
Democratic
Elected U.S. Senator
Henry G. Davis
Democratic

First-term Democrat Henry G. Davis was re-elected January 26, 1877 on the third ballot.

Democratic nomination
Candidate	Ballots						
Candidate	1st	2nd	3rd	4th	5th	6th	7th
Charles J. Faulkner	22	24	26	23	25	22	22
Henry G. Davis	22	21	19	18	21	20	22
John Brannon	2	4	5	4	4	7	4
Gideon D. Camden	7	3	4	3	1	4	2
John J. Davis	4	5	4	10	8	6	6
Scattered	8	6	5	3	2	5	8
Total	65	63	63	61	61	64	64
Needed to win	35						

House and Senate balloting
Party	Candidate	House		Senate	
Party	Candidate	Votes	%	Votes	%
Democratic	Henry G. Davis	21	33.3	6	26.1
Democratic	Charles J. Faulkner	18	28.6	7	30.4
Democratic	Gideon D. Camden	3	4.8	4	17.4
Democratic	John Brannon	5	7.9	2	8.7
Democratic	John J. Davis	10	15.9	2	8.7
Democratic	Johnson N. Camden	1	1.6	2	8.7
Republican	Archibald Campbell	1	1.6	0	0.0
Democratic	Alpheus F. Haymond	1	1.6	0	0.0
Democratic	Daniel D. Johnson	1	1.6	0	0.0
Democratic	Daniel Lamb	1	1.6	0	0.0
Republican	George Loomis	1	1.6	0	0.0
Total		63	100	23	100
Needed to win		32	>50	12	>50

Joint Session balloting
Party	Candidate	Ballots		
Party	Candidate	1st	2nd	3rd
Democratic	Henry G. Davis	24	26	60
Democratic	Charles J. Faulkner	24	23	19
Democratic	John Brannon	11	15	2
Democratic	Gideon D. Camden	5	6	3
Democratic	John J. Davis	15	12	1
Other candidates		8	5	2
Total		87	87	87
Needed to win		44	44	44

Davis would retire after this second term, in 1883.

== See also ==
- 1876 United States elections
  - 1876 United States presidential election
  - 1876–77 United States House of Representatives elections
- 44th United States Congress
- 45th United States Congress
