= 1861 United States Senate election in Pennsylvania =

- January 8, 1861
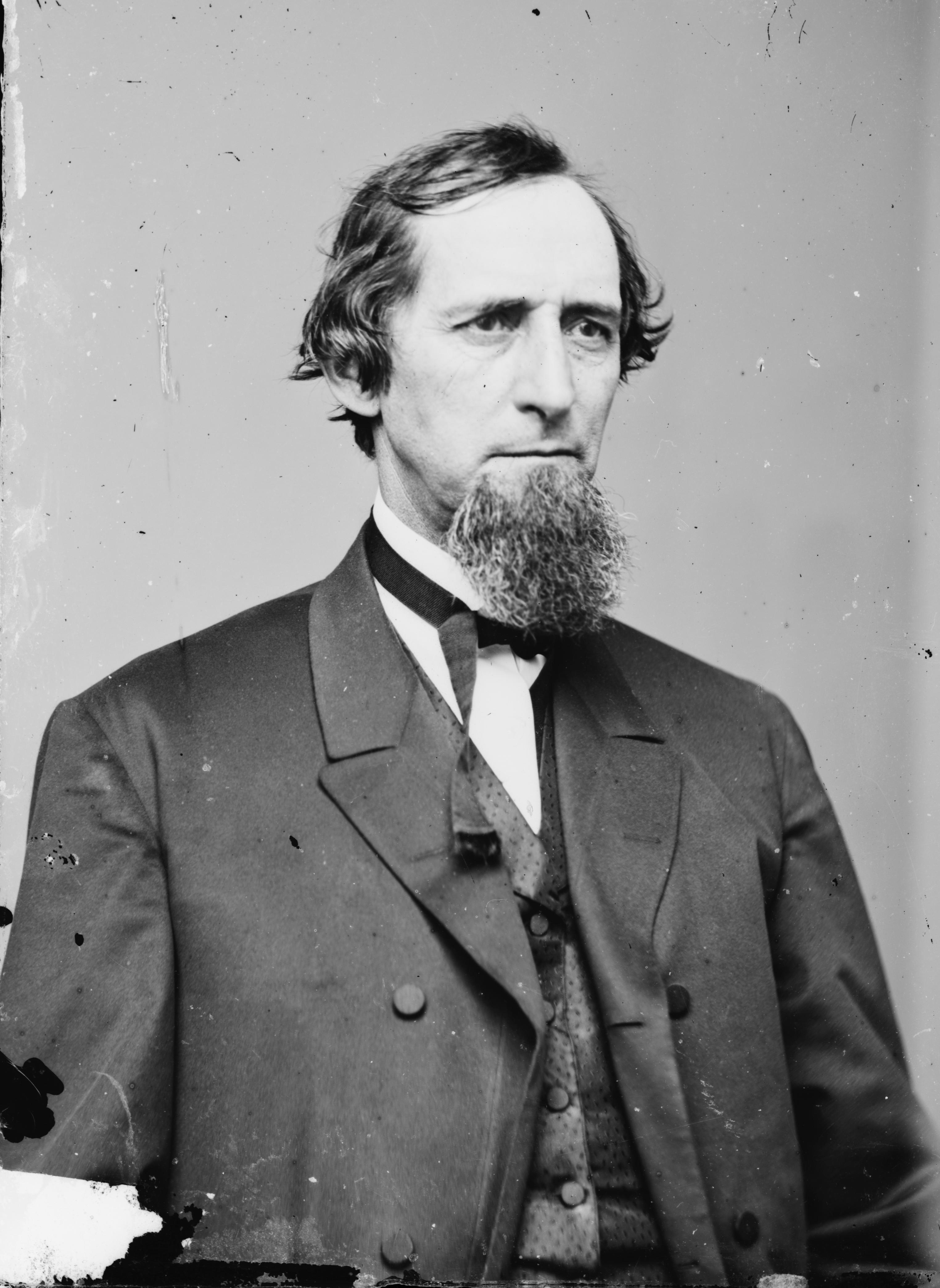

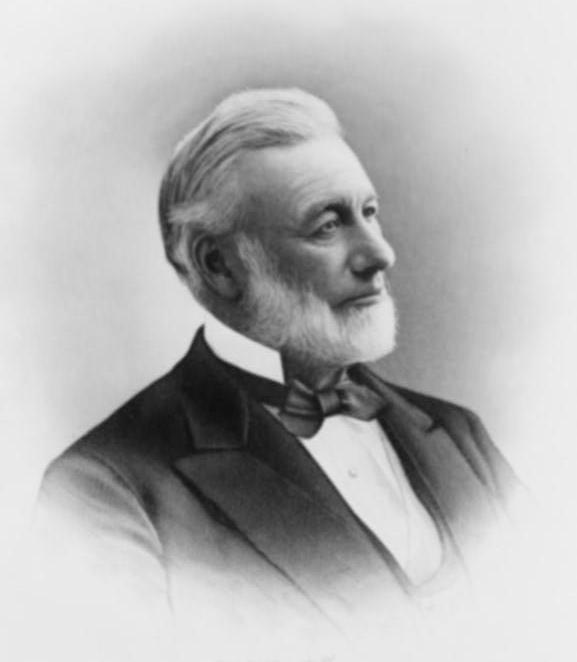
Nominee	Edgar Cowan	Henry Foster
Party	Republican	Republican
Alliance		Democratic
Leg. vote	98	35
Percentage	73.68%	26.32%
U.S. senator before election
William Bigler
Democratic
Elected U.S. Senator
Edgar Cowan
Republican

The 1861 United States Senate election in Pennsylvania was held on January 8, 1861. Edgar Cowan was elected by the Pennsylvania General Assembly to the United States Senate.

== Results ==
Incumbent Democrat William Bigler, who was elected in 1856, was not a candidate for re-election to another term. The Pennsylvania General Assembly, consisting of the House of Representatives and the Senate, convened on January 8, 1861, to elect a new senator to fill the term beginning on March 4, 1861. The results of the vote of both houses combined are as follows:

State legislature results
Party	Candidate	Votes	%
Republican	Edgar Cowan	98	73.68
Democratic	Henry Foster	35	26.32
Totals		133	100.00%

== See also ==
- 1860–61 United States Senate elections
- 1861 United States Senate special election in Pennsylvania

Preceded by 1856	Pennsylvania U.S. Senate election (Class III); 1861	Succeeded by 1867
