= 1866–67 United States Senate elections =

- Dates vary by state (and other dates for special elections)
- Class 3

25 of the 66 (6 vacant)/72 seats in the United States Senate (with special elections) 34 seats needed for a majority
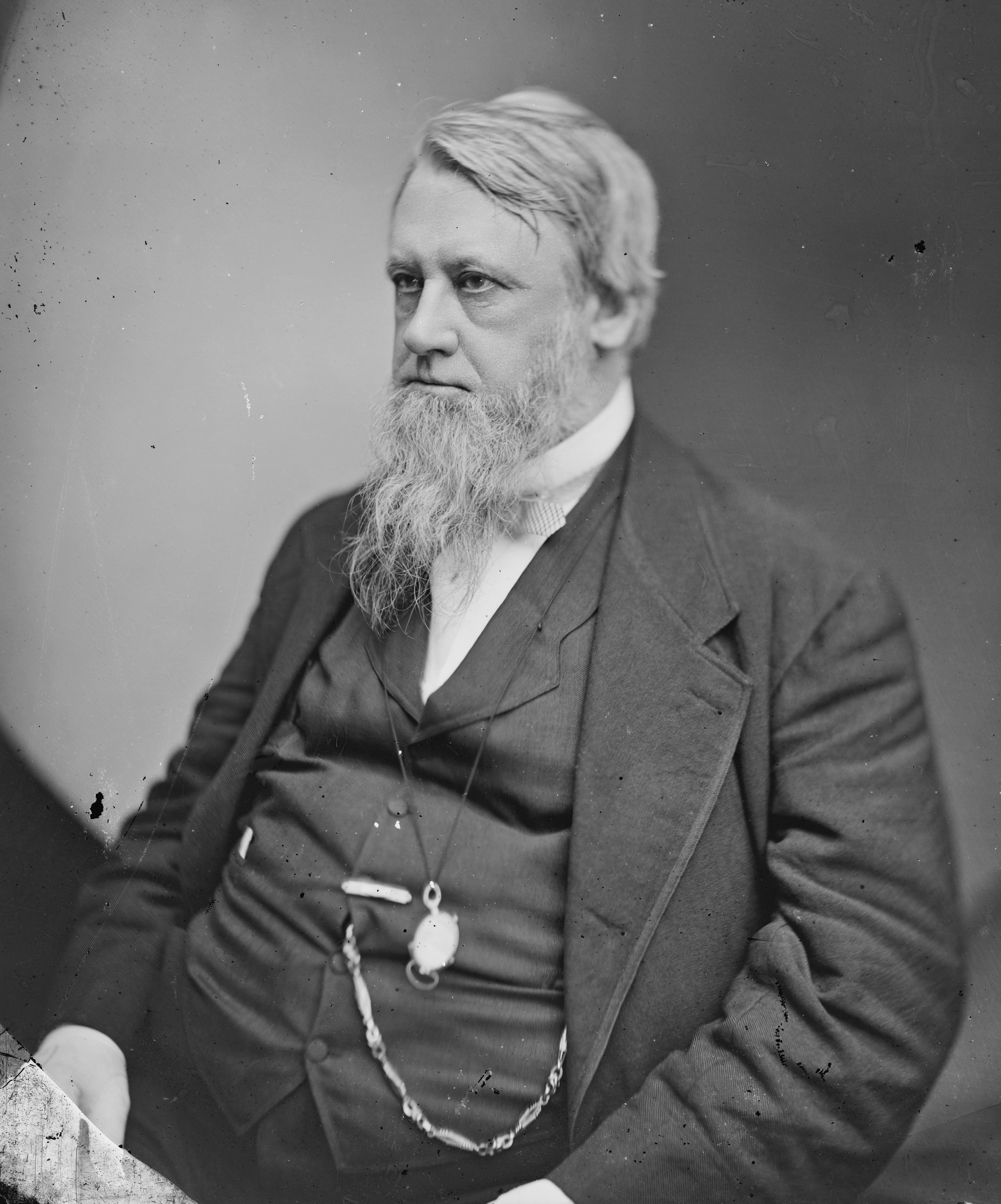

	Majority party	Minority party
Leader	Henry B. Anthony (Note: as Republican Conference Chair)
Party	Republican	Democratic
Leader since	March 4, 1863
Leader's seat	Rhode Island
Last election	33 seats	9 seats
Seats before	37	10
Seats won	15	2
Seats after	39	10
Seat change	▲2	Steady
Seats up	13	2
	Third party	Fourth party
Party	National Union	Unconditional Union
Last election	2 seats	4 seats
Seats before	3	2
Seats won	0	0
Seats after	2	1
Seat change	▼1	▼1
Seats up	1	1
- Results of the elections: Democratic gain Democratic hold Republican gain Republican hold Legislature failed to elect Unreconstructed states
Majority party before election
Republican
Elected Majority party
Republican

The 1866–67 United States Senate elections were held on various dates in various states. As these U.S. Senate elections were prior to the ratification of the Seventeenth Amendment in 1913, senators were chosen by state legislatures. Senators were elected over a wide range of time throughout 1866 and 1867, and a seat may have been filled months late or remained vacant due to legislative deadlock. In these elections, terms were up for the senators in Class 3.

The Republican Party gained two seats, as several states in the region of the Southern United States were readmitted during Reconstruction, enlarging their majority.

== Results summary ==
Senate party division, 40th Congress (1867–1869)

- Majority party: Republican (57)
- Minority party: Democratic (9)
- Other parties: (0)
- Vacant: (6)
- Total seats: 72

== Change in Senate composition ==
=== Before the elections ===
After August 31, 1866, appointment in New Hampshire.

V_{6} Seceded	V_{5} Seceded	V_{4} Seceded	V_{3} Seceded	V_{2}	V_{1}				
V_{7} Seceded	V_{8} Seceded	V_{9} Seceded	V_{10} Seceded	D_{1}	D_{2}	D_{3}	D_{4}	D_{5}	D_{6}
R_{37} Retired	UU_{1}	UU_{2} Unknown	U_{1}	U_{2}	U_{3} Ran	D_{10} Retired	D_{9} Ran	D_{8}	D_{7}
R_{36} Retired	R_{35} Retired	R_{34} Unknown	R_{33} Ran	R_{32} Ran	R_{31} Ran	R_{30} Ran	R_{29} Ran	R_{28} Ran	R_{27} Ran
Majority →									R_{27} Ran
R_{17}	R_{18}	R_{19}	R_{20}	R_{21}	R_{22}	R_{23}	R_{24}	R_{25} Ran	R_{26} Ran
R_{16}	R_{15}	R_{14}	R_{13}	R_{12}	R_{11}	R_{10}	R_{9}	R_{8}	R_{7}
V_{14}	V_{13}	V_{12}	V_{11}	R_{1}	R_{2}	R_{3}	R_{4}	R_{5}	R_{6}
V_{15}	V_{16}	V_{17}	V_{18}	V_{19}	V_{20}				

=== As a result of the elections ===
V_{6} Seceded	V_{5} Seceded	V_{4} Seceded	V_{3} Seceded	V_{2}	V_{1}				
V_{7} Seceded	V_{8} Seceded	V_{9} Seceded	V_{10} Seceded	D_{1}	D_{2}	D_{3}	D_{4}	D_{5}	D_{6}
R_{37} Hold	R_{38} Gain	R_{39} Gain	UU_{1}	U_{1}	U_{2}	D_{10} Gain	D_{9} Gain	D_{8}	D_{7}
R_{36} Hold	R_{35} Hold	R_{34} Hold	R_{33} Hold	R_{32} Hold	R_{31} Hold	R_{30} Hold	R_{29} Re-elected	R_{28} Re-elected	R_{27} Re-elected
Majority →									R_{27} Re-elected
R_{17}	R_{18}	R_{19}	R_{20}	R_{21}	R_{22}	R_{23}	R_{24}	R_{25} Re-elected	R_{26} Re-elected
R_{16}	R_{15}	R_{14}	R_{13}	R_{12}	R_{11}	R_{10}	R_{9}	R_{8}	R_{7}
V_{14}	V_{13}	V_{12}	V_{11}	R_{1}	R_{2}	R_{3}	R_{4}	R_{5}	R_{6}
V_{15}	V_{16}	V_{17}	V_{18}	V_{19}	V_{20}				

=== Beginning of the next Congress ===
V_{7}	V_{6}	V_{5}	V_{4}	V_{3}	V_{2}	V_{1}			
V_{8}	V_{9}	V_{10}	V_{11} Not seated	D_{1}	D_{2}	D_{3}	D_{4}	D_{5}	D_{6}
R_{38}	R_{39}	R_{40} Changed	R_{41} Changed	R_{42} New seat	R_{43} New seat	R_{44} Gain	R_{45} Gain	D_{8} Changed	D_{7}
R_{37}	R_{36}	R_{35}	R_{34}	R_{33}	R_{32}	R_{31}	R_{30}	R_{29}	R_{28}
Majority →									R_{27}
R_{18}	R_{19}	R_{20}	R_{21}	R_{22}	R_{23}	R_{24}	R_{25}	R_{26}	R_{27}
R_{17}	R_{16}	R_{15}	R_{14}	R_{13}	R_{12}	R_{11}	R_{10}	R_{9}	R_{8}
V_{14}	V_{13}	V_{12}	R_{1}	R_{2}	R_{3}	R_{4}	R_{5}	R_{6}	R_{7}
V_{15}	V_{16}	V_{17}	V_{18}	V_{19}	V_{20}	V_{21}			

Key:

D_{#}	Democratic
R_{#}	Republican
UU_{#}	Unconditional Unionist
U_{#}	Unionist
V_{#}	Vacant

== Race summaries ==
=== Special elections during the 39th Congress ===
In these special elections, the winners were seated during 1866 or in 1867 before March 4; ordered by election date.

State	Incumbent			Results	Candidates
State	Senator	Party	Electoral history	Results	Candidates
Maine (Class 2)	Nathan A. Farwell	Republican	1864 (appointed)	Interim appointee elected January 11, 1865 to finish the term. Winner did not run for re-election to the next term; see below.	▌ ✓ Nathan A. Farwell (Republican); [data missing]
Iowa (Class 3)	James Harlan	Republican	1855; 1857 (voided); 1857 (special); 1860	Incumbent resigned May 15, 1865, to become U.S. Secretary of the Interior. New senator elected January 13, 1866. Republican hold. Winner did not run for re-election to the next term; see below.	▌ ✓ Samuel J. Kirkwood (Republican); [data missing]
Tennessee (Class 1)	Vacant since March 4, 1862, when Andrew Johnson (D) resigned to become Military Governor of Tennessee.			State re-admitted to the Union. New senator elected July 24, 1866. Democratic gain.	▌ ✓ David T. Patterson (Democratic); [data missing]
Tennessee (Class 2)	Vacant since March 3, 1861, when Alfred O. P. Nicholson (D) withdrew in anticipation of secession.			State re-admitted to the Union. New senator elected July 24, 1866. Unionist gain.	▌ ✓ Joseph S. Fowler (Unionist); [data missing]
New Jersey (Class 2)	John P. Stockton	Democratic	1864	Incumbent's election disputed and seat declared vacant. New senator elected September 19, 1866. Republican gain.	▌ ✓ Alexander G. Cattell (Republican) 44; against - none
Vermont (Class 1)	George F. Edmunds	Republican	1866 (appointed)	Interim appointee elected October 24, 1866 to finish the term.	▌ ✓ George F. Edmunds (Republican); [data missing]
Vermont (Class 3)	Luke P. Poland	Republican	1865 (appointed)	Interim appointee elected October 24, 1866 to finish the term. Winner lost re-election to the next term; see below.	▌ ✓ Luke P. Poland (Republican); [data missing]
Kansas (Class 2)	Edmund G. Ross	Republican	1866 (appointed)	Interim appointee elected January 23, 1867 to finish the term.	▌ ✓ Edmund G. Ross (Republican); [data missing]
New Jersey (Class 1)	Frederick T. Frelinghuysen	Republican	1866 (appointed)	Interim appointee elected January 23, 1867 to finish the term.	▌ ✓ Frederick T. Frelinghuysen (Republican); [data missing]
Nebraska (Class 1)	None (new state)			Nebraska admitted to the Union March 1, 1867. Senator elected March 1, 1867. Republican gain.	▌ ✓ Thomas Tipton (Republican); [data missing]
Nebraska (Class 2)	None (new state)			Nebraska admitted to the Union March 1, 1867. Senator elected March 1, 1867. Republican gain.	▌ ✓ John M. Thayer (Republican); [data missing]

=== Races leading to the 40th Congress ===
In these regular elections, the winners were elected for the term beginning March 4, 1867; ordered by state.

All of the elections involved the Class 3 seats.

State	Incumbent			Results	Candidates
State	Senator	Party	Electoral history	Results	Candidates
Alabama	Vacant since January 21, 1861, when Benjamin Fitzpatrick (D) withdrew.			Legislature failed to elect during Civil War and Reconstruction. Seat remained vacant until 1868.	None.
Arkansas	Vacant since July 11, 1861, when Charles B. Mitchel (D) was expelled.			Legislature failed to elect during Civil War and Reconstruction. Seat remained vacant until 1868.	None.
California	James A. McDougall	Democratic	1860	Incumbent retired. New senator elected in 1866 or 1867. Republican gain.	▌ ✓ Cornelius Cole (Republican); [data missing]
Connecticut	Lafayette S. Foster	Republican	1860	Incumbent lost re-election. New senator elected in 1866. Republican hold.	▌ ✓ Orris S. Ferry (Republican); ▌Lafayette S. Foster (Republican); [data missing]
Florida	Vacant since January 21, 1861, when David Levy Yulee (D) withdrew.			Legislature failed to elect during Civil War and Reconstruction. Seat remained vacant until 1868.	None.
Georgia	Vacant since January 28, 1861, when Alfred Iverson Sr. (D) withdrew.			New senator elected in 1867. Senate refused to seat the winner. Seat remained vacant until 1871 when Georgia was readmitted.	▌ ✓ Joshua Hill (Republican); [data missing]
Illinois	Lyman Trumbull	Republican	1855; 1861	Incumbent re-elected in 1867.	▌ ✓ Lyman Trumbull (Republican); [data missing]
Iowa	Samuel J. Kirkwood	Republican	1865 (special)	Incumbent lost nomination. New senator elected January 13, 1866. Republican hold.	▌ ✓ James Harlan (Republican) 118 votes; ▌Henry Hoffman Trimble (Democratic) 20 votes
Indiana	Henry S. Lane	Republican	1860	Incumbent retired or lost re-election. New senator elected in 1867. Republican hold.	▌ ✓ Oliver P. Morton (Republican); [data missing]
Kansas	Samuel C. Pomeroy	Republican	1861	Incumbent re-elected in 1867.	▌ ✓ Samuel C. Pomeroy (Republican); [data missing]
Kentucky	Garrett Davis	Unionist	1861 (special)	Incumbent re-elected January 30, 1867, as a Democrat. Democratic gain.	▌ ✓ Garrett Davis (Democratic) 78; ▌ Benjamin Bristow (Unconditional Union) 41; ▌ Lazarus Powell (Democratic) 2; ▌ John C. Breckinridge (Democratic) 1; ▌ Jesse D. Bright (Democratic) 1; ▌ William O. Butler (Democratic) 1; ▌ James Fisher Robinson (Democratic) 1
Louisiana	Vacant since February 4, 1861, when John Slidell (D) resigned.			Legislature failed to elect during Civil War and Reconstruction. Seat remained vacant until 1868.	None.
Maryland	John Creswell	Unconditional; Unionist	1865 (special)	Incumbent retired or lost re-election. New senator elected in 1866 or in 1867. Senate refused to seat him, as he had "given aid and comfort" to the Confederate cause. Seat remained vacant until 1868. Unconditional Unionist loss.	▌ ✓ Philip Francis Thomas (Democratic); [data missing]
Missouri	B. Gratz Brown	Republican	1863 (special)	Incumbent retired due to ill health. New senator elected in 1866 or 1867. Republican hold.	▌ ✓ Charles D. Drake (Republican); [data missing]
Nevada	James W. Nye	Republican	1865	Incumbent re-elected in 1867.	▌ ✓ James W. Nye (Republican); [data missing]
New Hampshire	George G. Fogg	Republican	1866 (appointed)	Incumbent retired. New senator elected in 1866 or 1867. Republican hold.	▌ ✓ James W. Patterson (Republican); [data missing]
New York	Ira Harris	Republican	1861	Incumbent lost renomination. New senator elected January 15, 1867. Republican hold.	▌ ✓ Roscoe Conkling (Republican); ▌Henry C. Murphy (Democratic); ▌George F. Comstock (Democratic)
North Carolina	Vacant since March 11, 1861, when Thomas Clingman (D) resigned.			Legislature failed to elect during Civil War and Reconstruction. Seat remained vacant until 1868.	None.
Ohio	John Sherman	Republican	1861 (special)	Incumbent re-elected in 1866.	▌ ✓ John Sherman (Republican); [data missing]
Oregon	James Nesmith	Democratic	1860 or 1861	Incumbent lost re-election. New senator elected in 1866 or 1867. Republican gain.	▌ ✓ Henry W. Corbett (Republican); [data missing]
Pennsylvania	Edgar Cowan	Republican	1861	Incumbent lost re-election. New senator elected January 15, 1867. Republican hold.	▌ ✓ Simon Cameron (Republican) 61.65%; ▌Edgar Cowan (Republican) 36.84%
South Carolina	Vacant since November 11, 1860, when James Henry Hammond (D) withdrew.			Legislature failed to elect during Civil War and Reconstruction. Seat remained vacant until 1868.	None.
Vermont	Luke P. Poland	Republican	1865 (appointed); 1866	Incumbent lost re-election. New senator elected in 1866. Republican hold.	▌ ✓ Justin S. Morrill (Republican); ▌Luke P. Poland (Republican); [data missing]
Wisconsin	Timothy O. Howe	Republican	1861	Incumbent re-elected January 23, 1867.	▌ ✓ Timothy O. Howe (Republican) 74.22%; ▌Charles A. Eldredge (Democratic) 24.22%; ▌Edward S. Bragg (Democratic) 0.78%; ▌Joshua J. Guppey (Democratic) 0.78%

=== Elections during the 40th Congress ===
State	Incumbent			Results	Candidates
State	Senator	Party	Electoral history	Results	Candidates
Tennessee	David T. Patterson	Democratic	1866 (readmission)	Incumbent retired. Winner elected early on October 22, 1867, for the term beginning March 4, 1869. Republican gain.	▌ ✓ William G. Brownlow (Republican) 63; ▌William B. Stokes (Republican) 39

== New York ==
The New York election was held on January 15, 1867, by the New York State Legislature. Republican Ira Harris had been elected in February 1861 to this seat, and his term would expire on March 3, 1867.

At the state election in November 1865, 27 Republicans and 5 Democrats were elected for a two-year term (1866–1867) in the State Senate. At the state election in November 1866, 82 Republicans and 46 Democrats were elected for the session of 1867 to the Assembly. The 90th State Legislature met from January 1 to April 20, 1867, at Albany, New York.

The caucus of Republican State legislators met on January 10, State Senator Charles J. Folger presided. State Senator Thomas Parsons (28th D.) was absent, but had his vote cast by proxy. They nominated Congressman Roscoe Conkling for the U.S. Senate. The incumbent Senator Ira Harris was voted down.

Candidate	Informal ballot	First ballot	Second ballot	Third ballot	Fourth ballot	Fifth ballot
Roscoe Conkling	33	39	45	53		59
Noah Davis	30	41	44	50		49
Ira Harris	32	24	18	6		
Ransom Balcom	7	4	2	wd		
Horace Greeley	6	wd				
Charles J. Folger	1	1				1

Notes:

- On the fourth ballot, 110 votes were cast, one too many, and it was annulled.
- "wd" = name withdrawn

The caucus of the Democratic State legislators met also on January 10. State Senator Henry C. Murphy was nominated on the first ballot with 25 votes against 21 for Ex-D.A. of New York A. Oakey Hall. Roscoe Conkling was the choice of both the Assembly and the State Senate, and was declared elected.

1867 United States Senator election result
House	Republican		Democratic		Democratic	
State Senate (32 members)	Roscoe Conkling	24	Henry C. Murphy	2	George F. Comstock	1
State Assembly (128 members)	Roscoe Conkling	78	Henry C. Murphy	42		

Notes:

- The vote for Ex-Chief Judge Comstock was cast by Henry C. Murphy.
- The votes were cast on January 15, but both Houses met in a joint session on January 16 to compare nominations, and declare the result.

Conkling was re-elected in 1873 and 1879, and remained in office until May 17, 1881, when he resigned in protest against the distribution of federal patronage in New York by President James A. Garfield without being consulted. The crisis between the Stalwart and the Half-Breed factions of the Republican party arose when the leader of the New Yorker Half-Breeds William H. Robertson was appointed Collector of the Port of New York, a position Conkling wanted to give to one of his Stalwart friends.

== Pennsylvania ==
The Pennsylvania election was held on January 15, 1867. Simon Cameron was elected by the Pennsylvania General Assembly, having defeated Governor Andrew G. Curtin for the nomination of the Republican legislative caucus.

Incumbent Republican Edgar Cowan, who was elected in 1861, was a candidate for re-election to another term, but was defeated by former Democratic Senator and former United States Secretary of War Simon Cameron, who had previously switched to the Republican Party. The Pennsylvania General Assembly, consisting of the House of Representatives and the Senate, convened on January 15, 1867, to elect a Senator to fill the term beginning on March 4, 1867. The results of the vote of both houses combined are as follows:

State Legislature Results
Party	Candidate	Votes	%
Republican	Simon Cameron	82	61.65
Republican	Edgar Cowan (Inc.)	49	36.84
N/A	Not voting	2	1.50
Totals		133	100.00%

== See also ==
- 1866 United States elections
  - 1866–67 United States House of Representatives elections
- 39th United States Congress
- 40th United States Congress
