= 1856 United States Senate election in Pennsylvania =

- January 14, 1856
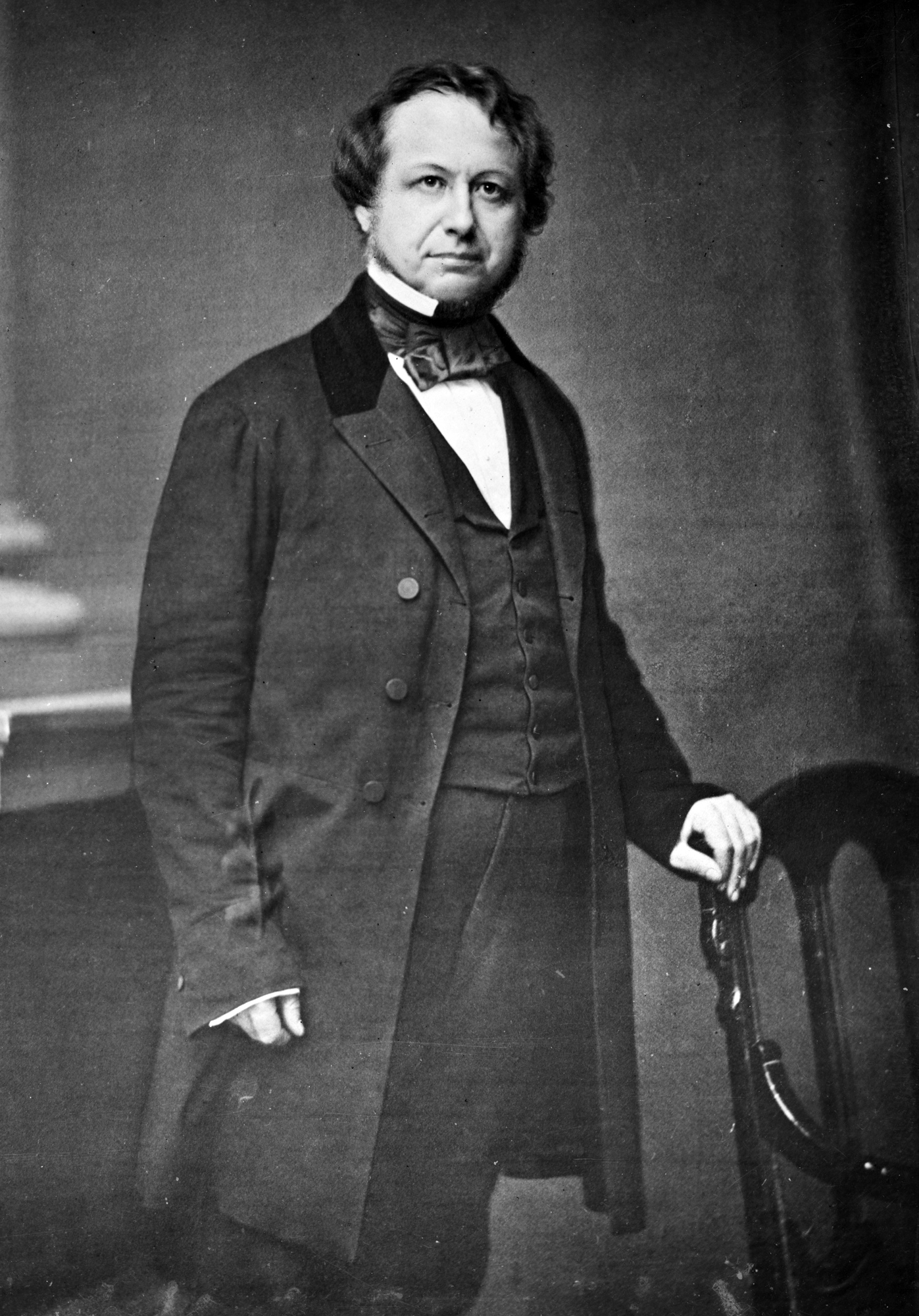

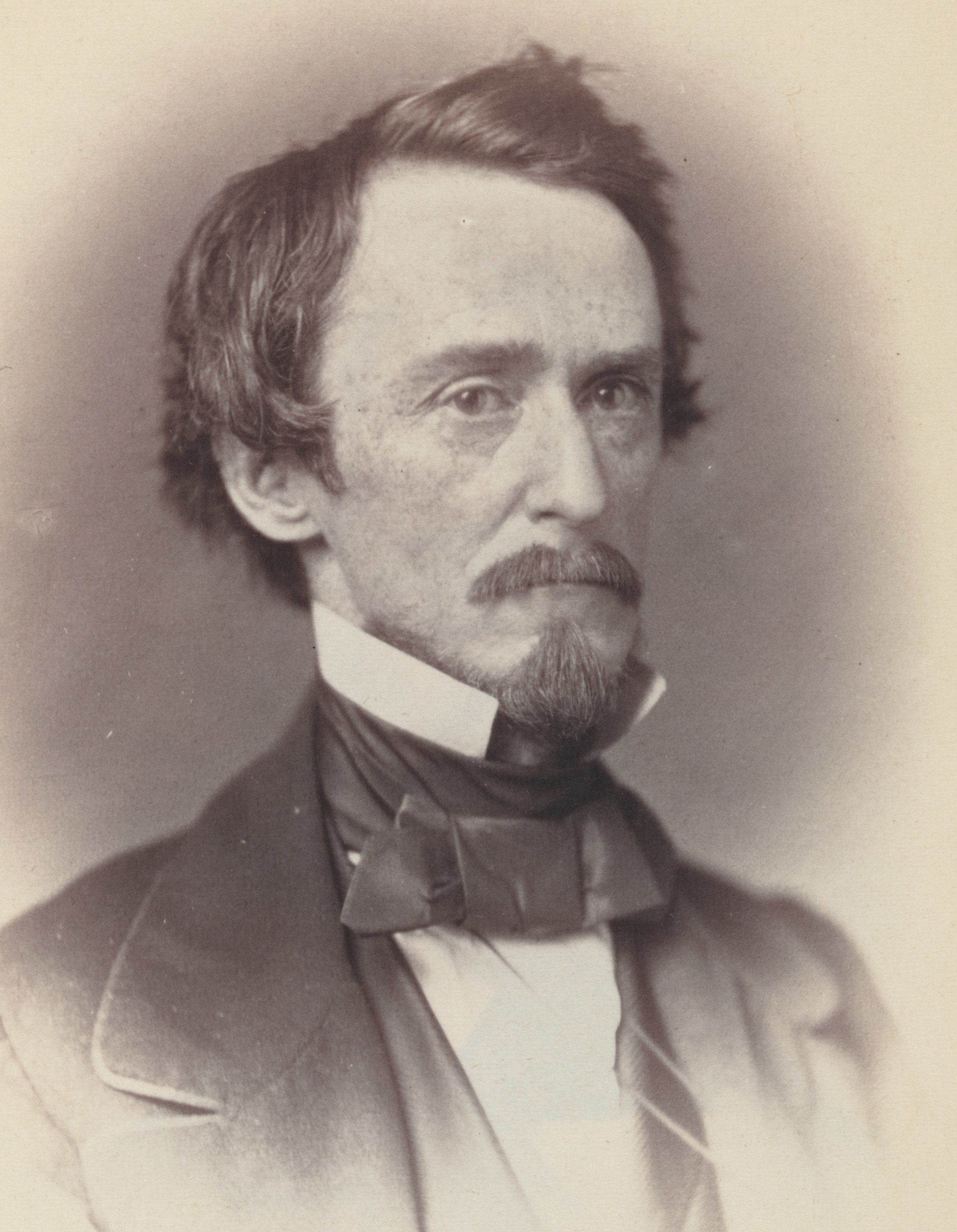
Nominee	William Bigler	Edward Joy Morris
Party	Democratic	Republican
Leg. vote	82	43
Percentage	61.65%	32.33%
U.S. senator before election
William Bigler
Democratic
Elected U.S. Senator
Edgar Cowan
Republican

The 1856 United States Senate election in Pennsylvania was held on January 14, 1856. William Bigler was elected by the Pennsylvania General Assembly to the United States Senate.

== Background ==
The Pennsylvania General Assembly, consisting of the House of Representatives and the Senate, convened on February 13, 1855, for the regularly scheduled Senate election for the term beginning on March 4, 1855. Two ballots were recorded on February 13, followed by three on February 27, 1855. On the fifth and final ballot during this convention, former Senator Simon Cameron had led with 55 votes to future Senator Charles R. Buckalew's 23. No candidate was elected, however, and the hung election convention adjourned by a vote of 66 to 65. Upon the expiration of incumbent James Cooper's term on March 4, 1855, the seat was vacated and would remain vacant until William Bigler's election in January 1856.

== Results ==
On January 14, 1856, the election convention of the General Assembly re-convened and elected Democratic former governor of Pennsylvania William Bigler on the first ballot to serve the remainder of the term that began on March 4, 1855, and would expire on March 4, 1861. The results of the vote of both houses combined are as follows:

State legislature results
Party	Candidate	Votes	%
Democratic	William Bigler	82	61.65
Republican	Edward Joy Morris	43	32.33
Unknown	John C. Flenniken	1	0.75
N/A	Not voting	7	5.26
Totals		133	100.00%

== See also ==
- 1856–57 United States Senate elections

Preceded by 1849	Pennsylvania U.S. Senate election (Class III); 1856	Succeeded by 1861
