= 1857 United States Senate election in Pennsylvania =

The 1857 United States Senate election in Pennsylvania was held on January 13, 1857. Simon Cameron was elected by the Pennsylvania General Assembly to the United States Senate.

== Results ==
The Pennsylvania General Assembly, consisting of the House of Representatives and the Senate, convened on January 13, 1857, to elect a senator to serve the term beginning on March 4, 1857. The results of the vote of both houses combined are as follows:

State legislature results
Party	Candidate	Votes	%
Republican	Simon Cameron	67	50.38
Democratic	John W. Forney	58	43.61
Democratic	Henry D. Foster	7	5.26
Democratic	William Wilkins	1	0.75
Totals		133	100.00%

Preceded by 1851	Pennsylvania U.S. Senate election (Class I); 1857	Succeeded by 1861
