= 1861 United States Senate special election in Pennsylvania =

The 1861 United States Senate special election in Pennsylvania was held on March 14, 1861. David Wilmot was elected by the Pennsylvania General Assembly to the United States Senate.

== Background ==
The Republican Simon Cameron was elected to the United States Senate by the General Assembly, consisting of the House of Representatives and the Senate, in January 1857. Sen. Cameron resigned on March 4, 1861, to become United States Secretary of War in the Abraham Lincoln administration, vacating the seat.

== Results ==
Following the resignation of Sen. Simon Cameron, the Pennsylvania General Assembly convened on March 14, 1861, to elect a new senator to fill the vacancy. The results of the vote of both houses combined are as follows:

State legislature results
Party	Candidate	Votes	%
Republican	David Wilmot	96	72.18
Democratic	William H. Welsh	34	25.56
Republican	Winthrop W. Ketcham	1	0.75
Democratic	William Wilkins	1	0.75
N/A	Not voting	1	0.75
Totals		133	100.00%

== See also ==
- 1860–61 United States Senate elections
- 1861 United States Senate election in Pennsylvania

Preceded by 1857	Pennsylvania U.S. Senate election (Class I); 1861	Succeeded by 1863
