= 1873 United States Senate election in Pennsylvania =

- January 21, 1873
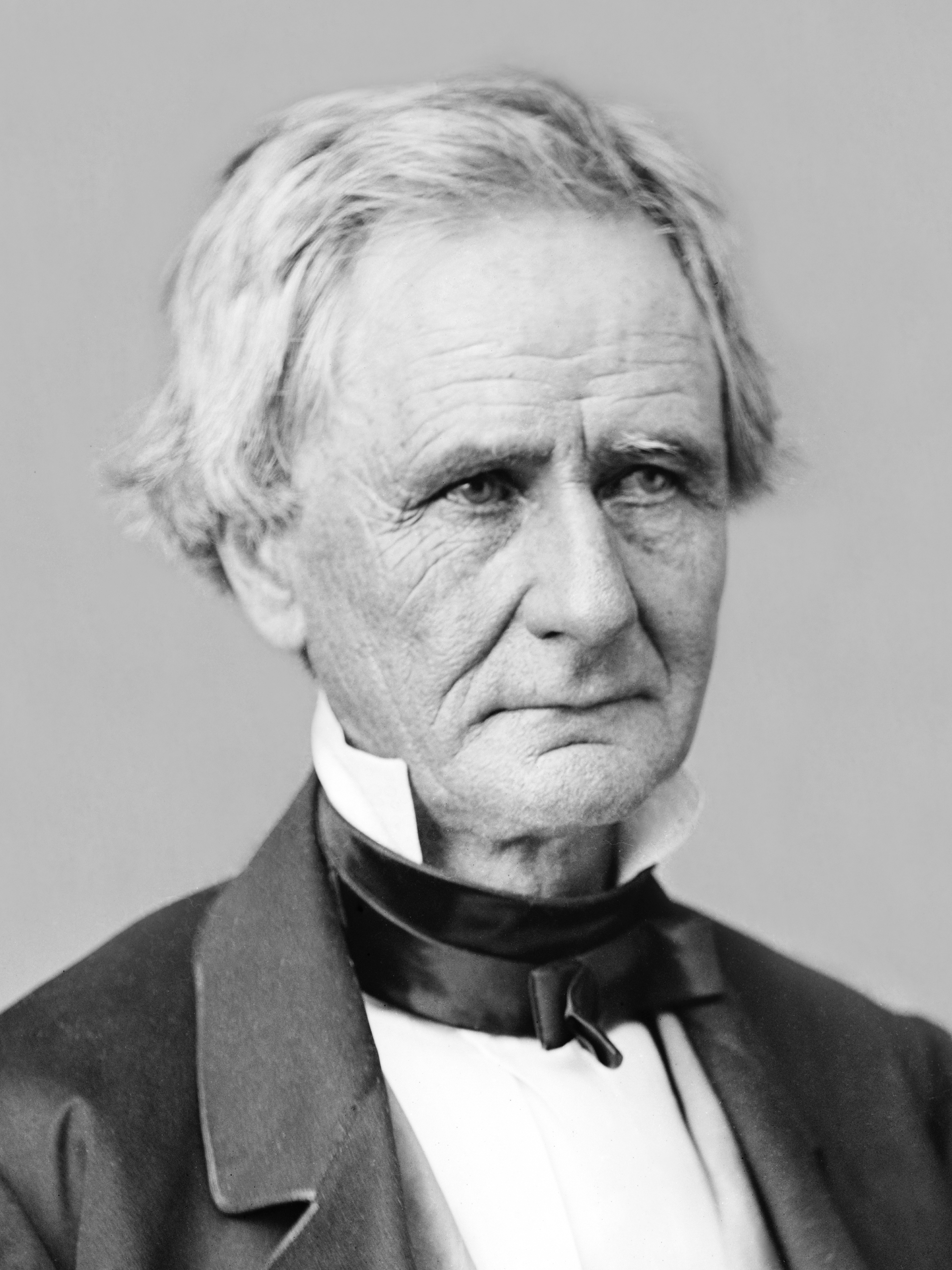

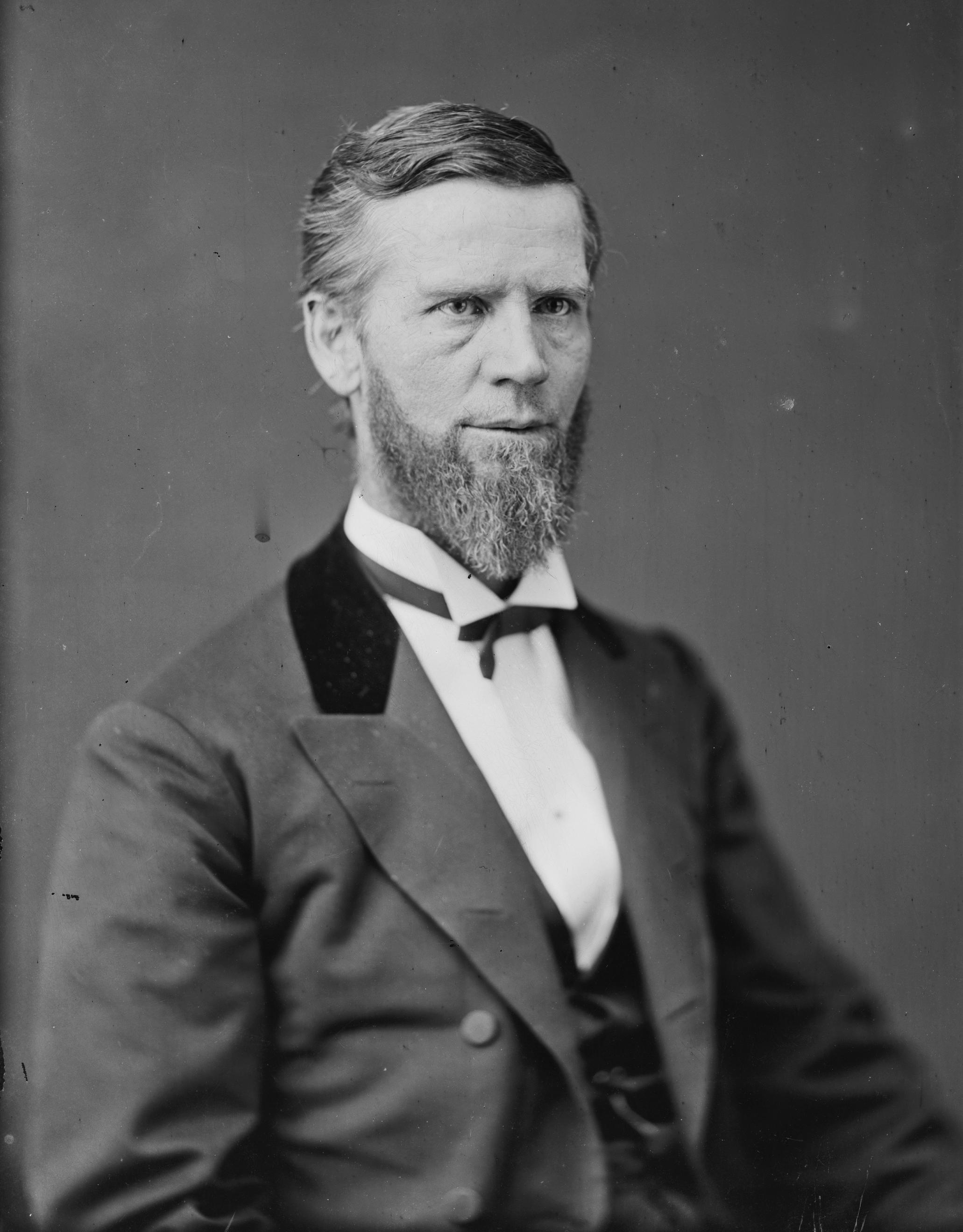
| Nominee | Simon Cameron | William A. Wallace |
| Party | Republican | Republican |
| Alliance | | Democratic |
| Leg. vote | 82 | 50 |
| Percentage | 57.14% | 37.59% |
U.S. senator before election
Simon Cameron
Republican
Elected U.S. Senator
Simon Cameron
Republican

The 1873 United States Senate election in Pennsylvania was held on January 21, 1873. Simon Cameron was re-elected by the Pennsylvania General Assembly to the United States Senate.

== Results ==
The Pennsylvania General Assembly, consisting of the House of Representatives and the Senate, convened on January 21, 1873, to elect a senator to fill the term beginning on March 4, 1873. Incumbent Republican Simon Cameron, who was elected in 1867, was a successful candidate for re-election to another term. The results of the vote of both houses combined are as follows:

State legislature results
| Party | Candidate | Votes | % |
|---|---|---|---|
| Republican | Simon Cameron (Inc.) | 76 | 57.14 |
| Democratic | William A. Wallace | 50 | 37.59 |
| Liberal Republican | Thomas Marshall | 1 | 0.75 |
| Democratic | Hendrick Wright | 1 | 0.75 |
| N/A | Not voting | 5 | 3.76 |
| Totals | | 133 | 100.00% |

== See also ==
- 1872–73 United States Senate elections

| Preceded by 1867 | Pennsylvania U.S. Senate election (Class III); 1873 | Succeeded by 1877 |
