= Pennsylvania Magazine of History and Biography =

- Discipline: History of Pennsylvania
- Language: English
- Edited by: Christina Larocco

Publication details
- History: 1877–present
- Publisher: Historical Society of Pennsylvania, University of Pennsylvania Press (United States)
- Frequency: Triannually

Standard abbreviations
- ISO 4: Pa. Mag. Hist. Biogr.

Indexing
- ISSN: 0031-4587
- LCCN: 2006267556
- OCLC no.: 1762062

Links
- Journal homepage

The Pennsylvania Magazine of History and Biography is a peer-reviewed academic journal covering the history of Pennsylvania. It has been published by the Historical Society of Pennsylvania since 1877. It is regarded as a prestigious historical journal in the US. Issues from January 2006 forward are available online on the History Cooperatives Web. Past issues, from 1907 through 2004, are freely available through Penn State University's digital library collections. Issues from 1877 through 2003 are also available on JSTOR.
