= Henry Donnel Foster =

American politician (1808–1880)

Henry D. Foster
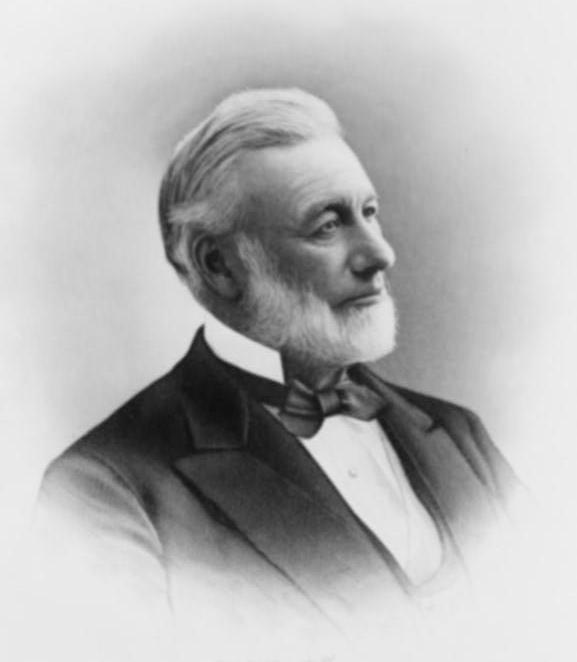

Member of the U.S. House of Representatives from Pennsylvania
- In office March 4, 1871 – March 3, 1873
- Preceded by: John Covode
- Succeeded by: Alexander Wilson Taylor
- Constituency: 21st district
- In office March 4, 1843 – March 3, 1847
- Preceded by: Albert Gallatin Marchand
- Succeeded by: Job Mann
- Constituency: 19th district

Member of the Pennsylvania House of Representatives Fayette and Westmoreland counties
- In office 1857–1858

Personal details
- Born: Henry Donnel Foster; December 19, 1808 Mercer, Pennsylvania, U.S.
- Died: October 16, 1880 (aged 71) Irwin, Pennsylvania, U.S.
- Resting place: St. Clair Cemetery; Greensburg, Pennsylvania, U.S.
- Party: Democratic
- Relatives: John Cabell Breckinridge (cousin)
- Education: College of Meadville
- Occupation: Politician; lawyer

Henry Donnel Foster (December 19, 1808 – October 16, 1880) was an American lawyer and politician who served three terms as a Democratic member of the U.S. House of Representatives from Pennsylvania from 1843 to 1847, and from 1871 to 1873.

== Early life ==
Henry Donnel Foster was born on December 19, 1808, in Mercer, Pennsylvania, to Samuel Foster. His mother's maiden name was Donnell. His father was a lawyer. Foster pursued classical studies and graduated from the College of Meadville. He studied law, was admitted to the bar in 1829.

== Career ==
After graduating, Foster commenced practice in Greensburg, Pennsylvania. He worked as a solicitor for the Pennsylvania Railroad.

=== Congress ===
Foster was elected as a Democrat to the Twenty-eighth and Twenty-ninth Congresses.

=== Later political career ===
He served as a member of the Pennsylvania State House of Representatives, representing Fayette and Westmoreland counties, in 1857 and 1858.

He was an unsuccessful candidate for election to Congress in 1858. He was also an unsuccessful candidate for Governor in 1860. He unsuccessfully contested the election of John Covode to the Forty-first Congress.

=== Return to Congress ===
Foster was again elected to the Forty-second Congress. He was an unsuccessful candidate for reelection in 1872.

=== Later career ===
Foster resumed the practice of law in Greensburg until 1880.

== Personal life ==
Foster had at least two children, Emily and Lizzie.

He was the cousin of John Cabell Breckinridge.

== Death and burial ==
In 1879, Foster moved to Irwin, Pennsylvania. He died on October 16, 1880, in Irwin. He was interred at St. Clair Cemetery in Greensburg.

Party political offices
Preceded by William F. Packer	Democratic nominee for Governor of Pennsylvania; 1860	Succeeded by George Washington Woodward
U.S. House of Representatives
Preceded by Albert G. Marchand	Member of the U.S. House of Representatives from Pennsylvania's 19th congressional district 1843–1847	Succeeded by Job Mann
Preceded by John Covode	Member of the U.S. House of Representatives from Pennsylvania's 21st congressional district 1871–1873	Succeeded by Alexander W. Taylor
