= Edgar Cowan =

American politician (1815–1885)

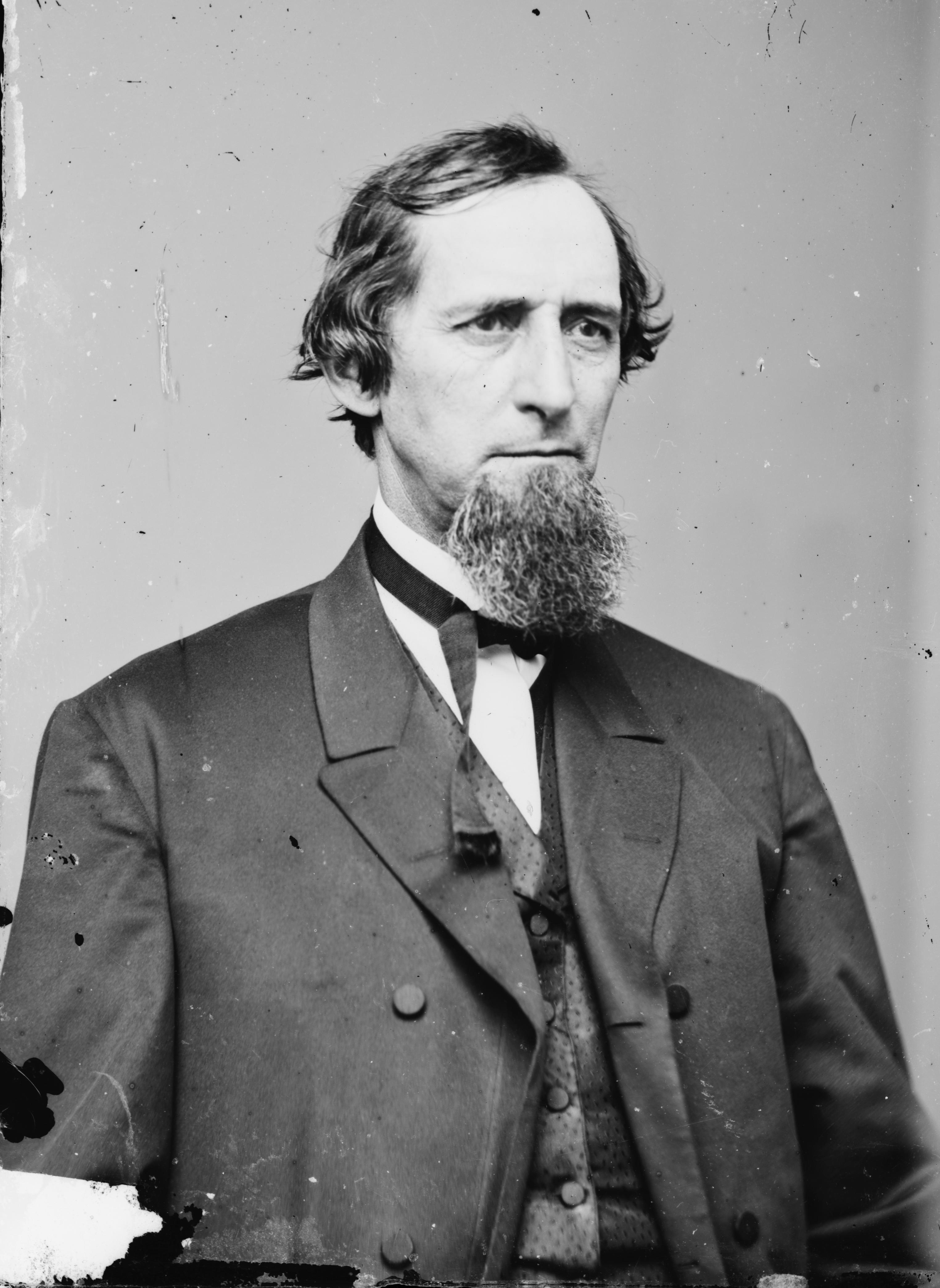

United States Senator from Pennsylvania
- In office March 4, 1861 – March 3, 1867
- Preceded by: William Bigler
- Succeeded by: Simon Cameron

Personal details
- Born: September 19, 1815 Sewickley Township, Pennsylvania, U.S.
- Died: August 31, 1885 (aged 69) Greensburg, Pennsylvania, U.S.
- Resting place: St. Clair Cemetery, Greensburg, Pennsylvania
- Party: Whig (before 1855); Republican (from 1855); Democratic (from 1867)
- Spouse: Lucitra Oliver Cowan
- Children: 3
- Education: Franklin College
- Profession: Attorney

Edgar Cowan (September 19, 1815 – August 31, 1885) was an American lawyer and Republican politician from Greensburg, Pennsylvania. He represented Pennsylvania in the United States Senate during the American Civil War.

A native of Sewickley Township, Pennsylvania, Cowan worked as a carpenter, boatman, and teacher before graduating from Franklin College in New Athens, Ohio, in 1839. He studied law with Henry Donnel Foster, was admitted to the bar, and practiced in Greensburg, Pennsylvania. Cowan also became active in politics as a Whig, and campaigned for the party's presidential candidates beginning with William Henry Harrison in 1840. With the demise of the Whigs, Cowan became a Republican in 1855, and supported John C. Frémont for president in the 1856 election.

In 1860, Cowan was a delegate pledged to Simon Cameron at the Republican National Convention, and backed Cameron until Cameron gave his support to Abraham Lincoln. In early 1861, Cowan was the Cameron-backed candidate for a U.S. Senate seat, and won the election held by the Pennsylvania legislature. He served one term, 1861 to 1867, and was chairman of the Committee on Patents and the Patent Office for most of his Senate career. Cowan became a supporter of Andrew Johnson's plan for post-Civil War Reconstruction, which cost him the support of Cameron's Republican organization in Pennsylvania. Cowan was defeated for reelection to the Senate, and Radical Republicans who opposed Johnson then blocked Cowan's appointment as U.S. Minister to Austria.

After leaving the Senate, he supported Democratic candidates such as Samuel J. Tilden in 1876 and Winfield Scott Hancock in 1880. Cowan became ill with mouth and throat cancer in 1884. He died in Greensburg on August 31, 1885, and was buried at St. Clair Cemetery in Greensburg.

== Early life and education ==
Cowan was born in Sewickley Township, Pennsylvania, on September 19, 1815. He was educated in Westmoreland County, taught school and worked as a carpenter, draftsman, and cargo boat builder and operator before deciding to continue his education. After attending the academy in Greensburg, Pennsylvania, Cowan returned to teaching school briefly before enrolling at Franklin College in New Athens, Ohio. He received his degree in 1839, and delivered the valedictory address for his graduating class.

After his college graduation, Cowan studied law with Henry Donnel Foster, was admitted to the bar and commenced practice in 1842. Though raised as a Jacksonian Democrat, Cowan became active in politics as a Whig, and was a campaign speaker and organizer for Whig presidential candidates beginning with William Henry Harrison in the 1840 election. He became a Republican when the party was founded, and was an organizer and speaker for John C. Frémont in the 1856 election. Cowan was a supporter of Simon Cameron, and as a delegate to the 1860 Republican National Convention, he supported Cameron for the presidential nomination until Cameron gave his support to Abraham Lincoln on the second ballot. Cowan was one of Pennsylvania's presidential electors, and cast his ballot for Lincoln for president and Hannibal Hamlin for vice president.

== U. S. Senator ==
=== Election ===
In January 1861, the Pennsylvania legislature considered the election of a U.S. Senator for the term scheduled to start on March 4. With Republicans in control, it was clear that Democratic incumbent William Bigler would not be reelected, which made winning the nomination of the legislature's Republican caucus the real contest. The caucus considered several candidates before nominating Cowan on the sixth ballot with 58 votes to 38 for David Wilmot, and two for another candidate. In the election by the full legislature, Cowan defeated his former law teacher Henry Donnel Foster by a party-line vote of 98 to 38.

Recognized as loyal to Pennsylvania Republican leader Simon Cameron, shortly after winning the senate election, Cowan and John P. Sanderson traveled to Springfield, Illinois, to converse with Lincoln when it appeared he might withdraw the offer of a cabinet position for Cameron. Anxious not to make an enemy of the head of the Republican Party in such an important state, Lincoln eventually made good on the commitment to Cameron by appointing him as Secretary of War.

=== Committee assignments ===
Cowan's assignments included a seat on the Judiciary Committee. In addition, he served as chairman of the Committee on Patents and the Patent Office for almost his entire Senate tenure, which included the 37th through 39th Congresses.

=== Legislation ===
==== Steubenville Bridge ====
Cowan argued in favor of a change to legislation that authorized the construction of a new railroad bridge over the Ohio River at Steubenville, Ohio. Concerned that the bridge would limit the ability of boats and ships to transport cargo on the river, and opposed to what he saw as the expanding power of the Pennsylvania Railroad, Cowan supported revising the initial proposal, which resulted in lengthening the span to 300 feet and raising the deck to 90 feet above water level, which ensured that steamboat smokestacks would be able to clear it.

==== Civil War conscription ====
With respect to the Union effort during the American Civil War, Cowan received credit for authoring the proposal to allow individuals drafted for military service to be excused from serving after paying a $300 commutation fee. The commutation fee was intended to keep the cost of hiring a substitute (another route available to draftees wishing to avoid service) from becoming excessive. In addition, it was intended to raise money for the Union war effort. Despite the stated intent for enacting the commutation fee, it was one of the most hated policies of the war, with members of the poor and working classes protesting that it allowed the wealthy to avoid military service at their expense.

==== Civil Rights Act of 1866 ====
As senator, he argued against the Civil Rights Act of 1866. Cowan expressed concern that the first section of the Civil Rights Act of 1866, which repealed Dred Scott v. Sandford and granted birthright citizenship to all persons born in the United States, would grant citizenship to Gypsies and Chinese people. Cowan was especially concerned that the law would allow women the right to enter into contracts independently of their husbands. The debates over the Civil Rights Act included guaranteeing, at the federal level, the right for any free person to enter into a contract, and he argued that the federal government was not to involve itself in regulating contract law, which he saw as squarely within the domain of state power. In particular, he argued that the federal guarantee of contract rights might allow women to enter into contracts under their own person and not in the person of and with consent of their husbands. Woman's ability to enter into contracts was illegal due to coverture law, which were the set of laws referred to as the "civil death" of women. Under coverture, women's husbands owned their wives' property, wages, and body. Women had no legal right to contract, to property, or to bodily autonomy. Senator Cowan cautioned against the Civil Rights Act of 1866 as a bill that would threaten this order. According to Senator Cowan, "A married woman in no State that I know of has a right to make contracts generally...Now, I ask Senators...whether they are willing...to interfere with regard to the contracts of married women...I say that this bill...confers upon married women, upon minors, upon idiots, upon lunatics...the right to make and enforce contracts."

While largely invoking gender and marriage to make his points about states' rights, his arguments helped create a legal distinction between sex and race in federal law. In the senate, while trying to elucidate the meaning of the Thirteen Amendment, he stated, "What was the involuntary servitude mentioned there.... Was it the right the husband had to the service of his wife? Nobody can pretend that those things were within the purview of that Amendment; nobody believes it." Thus, "involuntary servitude" was only to be in reference to men in the service of other men, not women in legal service to their husbands. In response to arguments by the likes of Senator Cowan, the Civil Rights Act of 1866 was written to only apply to "race" and "color," but did not include gender.

==== Reconstruction ====
During the post-Civil War Reconstruction era, Cowan found himself increasingly in line with the policies of Andrew Johnson, which earned him the displeasure of the Radical Republicans who controlled the Senate and the Republican Party in Pennsylvania. Cowan was a candidate for reelection with the support of Democrats in the Pennsylvania legislature, but lost to former ally Simon Cameron. Johnson then nominated Cowan to be U.S. Minister to Austria, but Cowan's Radical Republican opponents in the Senate tabled the nomination, so it was never acted on.

==== Birthright citizenship ====
During an 1866 Congressional debate, Senator Cowan objected to the Fourteenth Amendment, which would grant Birthright citizenship. Cowan's reasoning was that it would have allowed non-white people, such as Romani and Chinese people, to become citizens. He argued that the Fourteenth Amendment would make states unable to stop themselves from being "invaded by a flood of Australians or people from Borneo, man-eaters or cannibals". Therefore, Cowan did not want the Fourteenth Amendment to pass, because it would result in a racially diverse society.

== Later career ==
After leaving the Senate, Cowan resumed practicing law in Greensburg. He continued to support the Democratic Party, and supported its presidential candidates Samuel J. Tilden in the election of 1876 and Winfield Scott Hancock for the 1880 election, including attending that year's Democratic National Convention as a delegate.

== Honors ==
In 1871, Franklin College awarded Cowan the honorary degree of LL.D.

== Death and burial ==
In 1884, Cowan was diagnosed with cancer of the mouth and throat. His condition deteriorated in 1885, to the point where he had difficulty eating and lost the ability to swallow. Cowan died in Greensburg on August 31, 1885, and was buried in Greensburg's St. Clair Cemetery.

== Family ==
In 1842, Cowan married Lucitra (Lucy) Oliver of West Newton, Pennsylvania. They were the parents of three children—Elizabeth, the wife of J. J. Hazlett, Frank, and James.

== Sources ==
=== Books ===
- Blanchard, Charles (190). The Progressive Men of the Commonwealth of Pennsylvania. Vol. 1. Logansport, IN: A. W. Bowen & Co. – via HathiTrust.
- Gresham, John M.; Wiley, Samuel T. (1890). Biographical and Historical Cyclopedia of Westmoreland County, Pennsylvania. Philadelphia, PA: Dunlap & Clarke.
- Pennsylvania Senate (1867). Journal of the Senate of the Commonwealth of Pennsylvania. Harrisburg, PA: Singerly & Myers.
- United States Senate (1887). Journal of the Executive Proceedings of the Senate of the United States of America. Vol. 15. Washington, DC: US Government Printing Office.

Union County, Pennsylvania: A Bicentennial History. (1976). Charles M. Snyder. Page 162.

=== Newspapers ===
- "Edgar Cowan Called From His Earthly Employments". The Weekly Courier. Connellsville, PA. September 4, 1885 – via Newspapers.com.

U.S. Senate
Preceded by William Bigler	U.S. senator (Class 3) from Pennsylvania; March 14, 1861 – March 3, 1867; Served alongside: Simon Cameron, David Wilmot and Charles R. Buckalew	Succeeded by Simon Cameron
