= Newcomer (surname) =

Newcomer is a surname. Notable people with the surname include:

- Benjamin Franklin Newcomer (1827–1901), American railroad executive and bank president
- Carrie Newcomer (born 1958), American singer and songwriter
- Christian Newcomer (1749–1830), American farmer and preacher
- Clarence Charles Newcomer (1923 – 2005), US District Judge of the United States District Court for the Eastern District of Pennsylvania
- Francis K. Newcomer (1889–1967), Governor of the Panama Canal Zone
- John Newcomer, American game developer, creator of Joust
- John Newcomer (Maryland politician) (1797–1861), American politician and farmer
- John Darlington Newcomer (1867–1931), American architect
- Scott Newcomer (born 1965), American politician
