= Wason =

Wason is a surname of Scottish origin. Notable people with this name include:

- Betty Wason, American news correspondent
- Cathcart Wason, Scottish farmer and politician
- Edward Hills Wason, American politician from New Hampshire
- Eugene Wason, Scottish lawyer and politician
- Harcourt Wason (born 1956), Barbadian sprinter
- Peter Cathcart Wason, British psychologist, inventor of Wason selection task
- Rigby Wason, Scottish lawyer and politician
- Robert Wason (Maryland politician), American politician from Maryland
- Robert Alexander Wason, American writer of Western novels
- Robert Wason Jr., American politician from Wisconsin
- Sandys Wason, English clergyman and writer
- Wendy Wason (active from 1997), Scottish writer, comedian and actress
- Wason Renteria, Colombian footballer in Brazil

== See also ==
- Wason Manufacturing Company, an American manufacturer of railway carriages and streetcars
- Wason-Springfield Steam Power Blocks, a historic site in Massachusetts
