= Robert Wason =

Robert Wason may refer to:

- Robert Wason (Maryland politician), member of the Maryland Senate, 1838–1840
- Robert Wason Jr., member of the Wisconsin Legislature, 1849
- Robert Alexander Wason (1874–1955), American writer
