= André De Takacs =

Sheet music cover illustrator

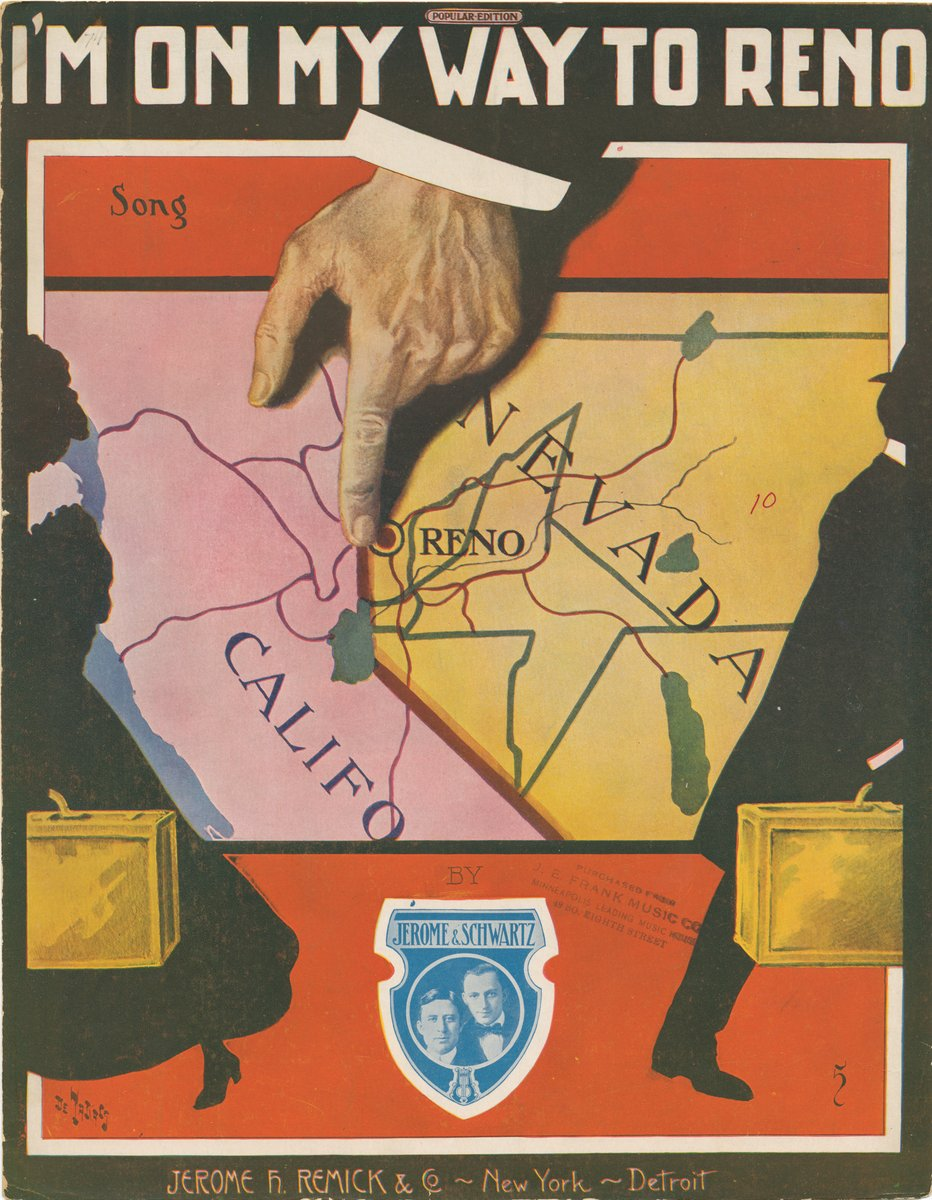
"I'm on My Way to Reno" sheet music cover

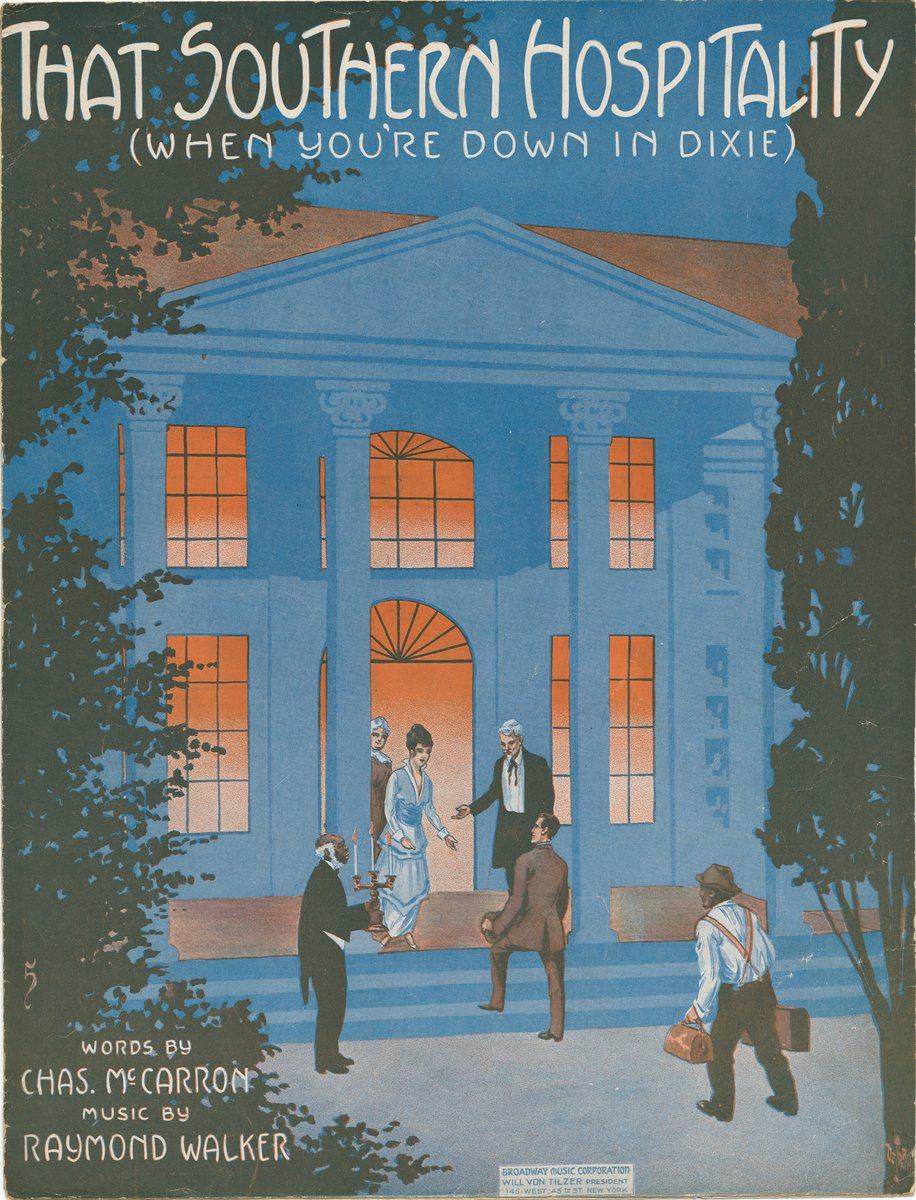
"That Southern Hospitality" song sheet cover

André Chevalier De Takacs (15 June 1880 Budapest, Hungary – 23 August 1919) was an illustrator.

== Career ==
De Takacs' artwork features on the covers of sheet music. He produced art for posters, postcards, and film company promotions. He also wrote music and poetry. The Smithsonian Libraries have some of his song sheet covers in their collection. The University of South Carolina's Tin Pan Alley Sheet Music Collection also includes his work.

He used several distinctive signatures and marks. His work includes covers from the era when minstrel performers were still popular and depictions of African Americans are based on stereotypes.

He immigrated to the U.S. from Hungary where his father was a count. He died at the age of 39, reportedly of a heart attack in a New York City taxi on the way to the hospital. His wife, Elizabeth "Bessie" Schenkel, took her life several years later. They had two daughters, one of them, Edythe Jepsen, also became an artist.

== Work ==
=== Music ===
- "Array Wanna" (1906)
- "If I Only Had the Nerve" (1906)
- Musical Joys for Boys and Girls (1908)
- "Falling Star" (1909)
- "I'm On My Way to Reno" (1910)
- "Air King" (1911)
- "I'd Be Proud to Be the Mother of a Soldier" (1915)
- "Honolulu Hicki Boola Boo Island" (1916)
- "The Cute Little Wigglin' Dance" (1917)
- "Everybody's Jazzin It"
- "Ragtime Cowboy Joe"

=== Books ===
- Nachette by Ned Nye, book
- The Ashes of My Heart by Edith Blinn, book
- Ad for The Long Chance (1915), a western film

== Bibliography ==
=== Sources ===
- Amundson, Michael A. (April 13, 2017). "The Phonograph and the West, 1877–1902": "Ragtime Cow Boy Joe". In Chapter 1 of Amundson's Talking Machine West: A History and Catalogue of Tin Pan Alley's Western Recordings, 1902–1918. University of Oklahoma Press. LCCN 2016-33167ISBN 978-0-8061-5777-1, 0-8061-5777-1.
1. Via Google Books (limited preview).
- Blinn, Edith. The Ashes of My Heart. Illustrations by Andre Comte De Takacs. LCCN 16-6313; OCLC 6435596 (all editions).
1. 2nd ed. – via Google Books (Harvard). New York: Mark-Well Publishing Company, Inc. 1916.
2. 1. Between pp. 8–9.
  2. Between pp. 42–43.
  3. Between pp. 60–61.
  4. Between pp. 114–115.
  5. Between pp. 126–127.
  6. Between pp. 154–155.
  7. Between pp. 224–225.
  8. Between pp. 246–247.
  9. Between pp. 262–263.
  10. Between pp. 322–323.
  11. Between pp. 372–373.
- Catalogue of Copyright Entries. "Part 1, Group 1: Books." "New Series".
1. Vol. 6, Group 1, No. 42, October 21, 1909: Nachette (book). By Ned Nye and Robert A[lexander] Wason. Illustrated by André De Takacs. Published by J. H. Remick & Co. Copyright August 10, 1909. Two deposit copies received August 11, 1909. Registration A 244652. Copyright proprietor: Jerome H. Remick & Co. p. 960. LCCN 09-24021; OCLC 1630168 (all editions).
  1. Google Books (Cal Berkeley).
- University of South Carolina (December 8, 2017). USC Library Digital Collections search term: André De Takacs. Tin Pan Alley Sheet Music Collection. Digital Collections.
- Short, Marion (December 8, 1998). Covers of Gold: Collectible Sheet Music – Sports, Fashion, Illustration, and the Dance. Atglen, Pennsylvania: Schiffer Publishing. pp. 119–120. LCCN 97-28752; ISBN 978-0-7643-0105-6, 0-7643-0105-5 (paperback); OL 8039990M.
1. Short, Marion (1998). Via Internet Archive. Schiffer Pub. ISBN 978-0-7643-0105-6.
2. Short, Marion (1998). Via Google Books (preview unavailable). Schiffer Pub. ISBN 978-0-7643-0105-6.
- Smithsonian (December 8, 2017). Smithsonian Library search term: "De Takacs, André C.".

Advanced... Help Category Discussion
