= Benjamin Franklin Newcomer =

American railroad and bank executive (1827–1901)

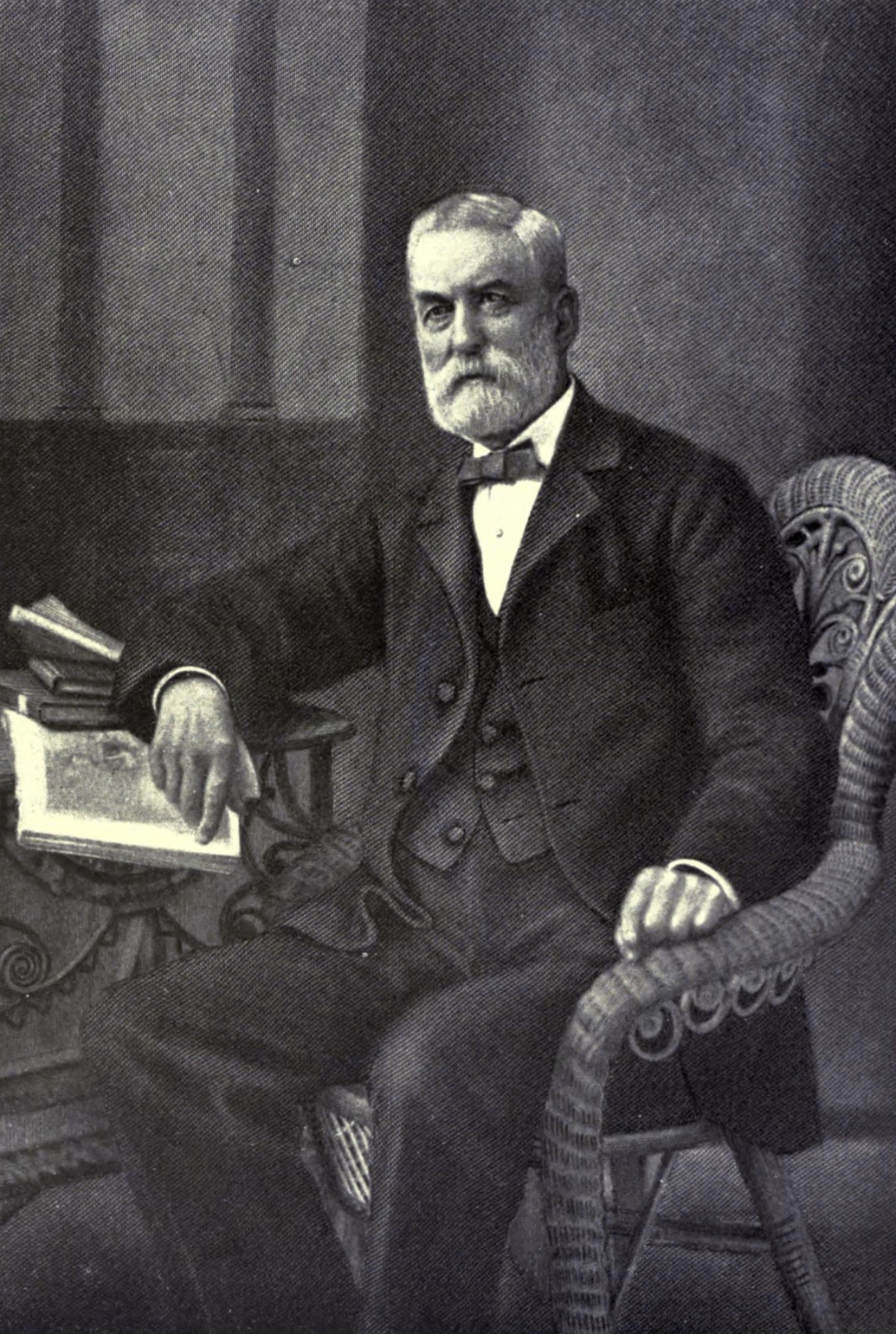
- Newcomer in 1912 publication

Personal details
- Born: April 28, 1827 Beaver Creek, Maryland, U.S.
- Died: March 30, 1901 (aged 73) Baltimore, Maryland, U.S.
- Resting place: Green Mount Cemetery; Baltimore, Maryland, U.S.
- Spouse(s): Amelia Louisa Ehlen (m. 1848; died 1881) Sidonia Kemp (m. 1887; died 1898)
- Children: 4, including Waldo
- Parent: John Newcomer (father)
- Occupation: Businessman; rail executive; bank president
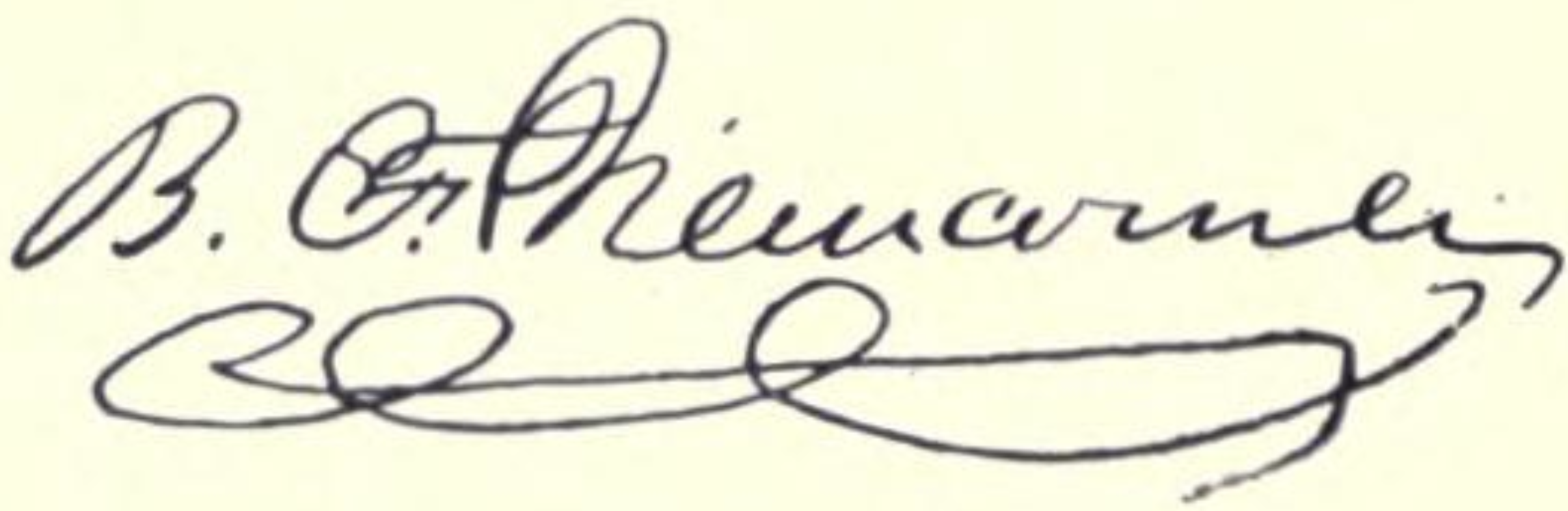
- Signature
- Nickname: Frank

Benjamin Franklin "Frank" Newcomer (April 28, 1827 – March 30, 1901) was an American railroad executive and bank president from Baltimore, Maryland.

== Early life ==
Benjamin Franklin Newcomer was born on April 28, 1827, in a log house in Beaver Creek, Washington County, Maryland, to Catherine (née Newcomer) and John Newcomer. From a young age, he was known as Frank. From 1829 to 1834, the family lived at Hagerstown. He worked on his farmer's farm and mill. He was sworn in as deputy sheriff at the age of ten. In 1837, the family moved back to Hagerstown and Newcomer attended the Hagerstown Academy in 1840, intending to become a civil engineer. In March 1841, the family moved back to Beaver Creek, and he worked on the farm. Afterward, Newcomer moved to Eutaw Street in Baltimore on July 24, 1842, to work for his father's business Newcomer & Stonebraker, a flour and grain commission firm.

== Career ==
At the age of 18, Newcomer bought his father's interest in Newcomer & Stonebraker. In 1862, Stonebraker withdrew from the firm and it became Newcomer & Company. The flour part of the business continued until the death of W. J. Doyle in 1896. Afterward, the business was used for financing Newcomer's railroad interests. He later retired from the company. In 1853, Newcomer helped organize the first Corn and Flour Exchange in Baltimore and served as one of its first directors. He remained a member of the exchange until his death.

In 1854, Newcomer became a director of the Union Bank (later the National Union Bank of Maryland). He was an incorporator of the Safe Deposit & Trust Company of Baltimore and served as its president for 33 years, starting in July 1868. He also served as director of the Savings Bank of Baltimore. At one point during the Civil War, Secretary of War Simon Cameron offered to establish the first national bank in Baltimore and appoint Newcomer as president, but Newcomer declined.

In 1861, Newcomer was elected as director of the Northern Central Railway and was made a chairman of the finance committee. He served as chairman until his death, expect for retiring between 1874 and 1878. He helped organize real estate purchases for Northern Central Railway. Newcomer served as director of Philadelphia, Wilmington and Baltimore Railroad and Baltimore and Potomac Railroad. In 1895, after the death of Oden Bowie, he served as president of the Baltimore and Potomac Railroad. In 1868, Newcomer served as a trustee, alongside William T. Walters, for a syndicate that purchased Wilmington and Weldon Railroad and Wilmington and Manchester Railroad to rehabilitate. They formed the Southern Railway Security Company and completed the Wilmington, Columbia and Augusta Railroad. They also purchased East Tennessee, Virginia and Georgia Railway, the Richmond and Danville Railroad and other railroads. They then consolidated the railroads as the Atlantic Coast Line Railroad of South Carolina in July 1898 and the Atlantic Coast Line Railroad of Virginia in November 1898. They were consolidated again as the Atlantic Coast Line Railroad in May 1900. Newcomer served as president of the Wilmington and Weldon Railroad from December 1, 1888, to February 12, 1890. He served as treasurer, vice president and director of the Atlantic Coast Line Railroad.

Newcomer was an incorporator of the Maryland Institution for the Instruction of the Blind (later the Maryland School for the Blind). He had a personal relationship with the blind since his sister and brother were blind. He served as the first secretary, treasurer in 1864 and succeeded J. Howard McHenry as president in 1881. He donated US$20,000 to the building fund. Newcomer's 1900 donation funded the Washington Free Library in Hagerstown, though the construction was complete until after his death. He also funded the Washington County Home for Orphans and Friendless Children at Hagerstown. He served as a member of the board of trustees of Johns Hopkins University due to his friendship with Daniel Coit Gilman. Newcomer served as director of the Mercantile Library.

== Personal life ==
Newcomer married Amelia Louisa Ehlen, daughter of Baltimore and Ohio Railroad director John H. Ehlen, on November 14, 1848. They had three daughters and a son, including Waldo Newcomer. His wife died on October 20, 1881. Newcomer married Sidonia (née Ayres) Kemp, widow of Morris J. Kemp, on February 9, 1887. She died on February 7, 1898.

Newcomer was a member of the Christian (Campbellite) church and often attended the Lutheran church with his wife. Newcomer was friends with Pennsylvania Railroad presidents Thomas A. Scott, George Brooke Roberts, John Edgar Thomson and Alexander Cassatt. He was also friends with his business partner William T. Walters and sculptor William Henry Rinehart.

Newcomer fell through an elevator hatchway towards the end of his life, injuring himself. He also suffered from a cataract that ultimately left him blind in one eye. Newcomer died from a stroke on March 30, 1901, at his home at 1211 St. Paul Street in Baltimore. He was buried at Green Mount Cemetery in Baltimore.

== Legacy ==
Sculptor Daniel Chester French made a sculpture of Newcomer called the "Newcomer Memorial Font" at Episcopal Emmanuel Church at 811 Cathedral Street in Mount Vernon, Baltimore. The sculpture of an angel was made to represent Newcomer's contributions to the city.
