= Cameron machine =

- Leader: • Simon Cameron • J. Donald Cameron • Matthew Quay • Boies Penrose
- Founded: c. 1860
- Dissolved: c. 1930s
- Ideology: • Anti-slavery • Grantism • Conservatism • Fiscal conservatism • Pro-spoils system • Protectionism • Hard money
- Political position: Right-wing
- National affiliation: Republican Party: Stalwarts (1880)

The Cameron machine, later known as the Quay machine and Penrose machine, was a Republican political machine in Pennsylvania that controlled much of the state's politics for seven decades. Founded by antislavery Know Nothing and Republican Simon Cameron, it passed into control of his son J. Donald Cameron, later controlled by Matthew Quay and finally Boies Penrose. The organization was financially and fiscally conservative, favoring higher protective tariffs and representing business interests.

The elder Cameron's leadership skills were contrasted with the weaker political abilities of his son Donald, and several Republican defeats resulted in a transfer of machine power into the hands of Quay, who utilized the machine's powers with shrewd effectiveness. The baton of machine boss was then passed for a final time to Penrose, whose death ended its power and influence.

== History and timeline ==
=== Simon Cameron establishes the machine ===
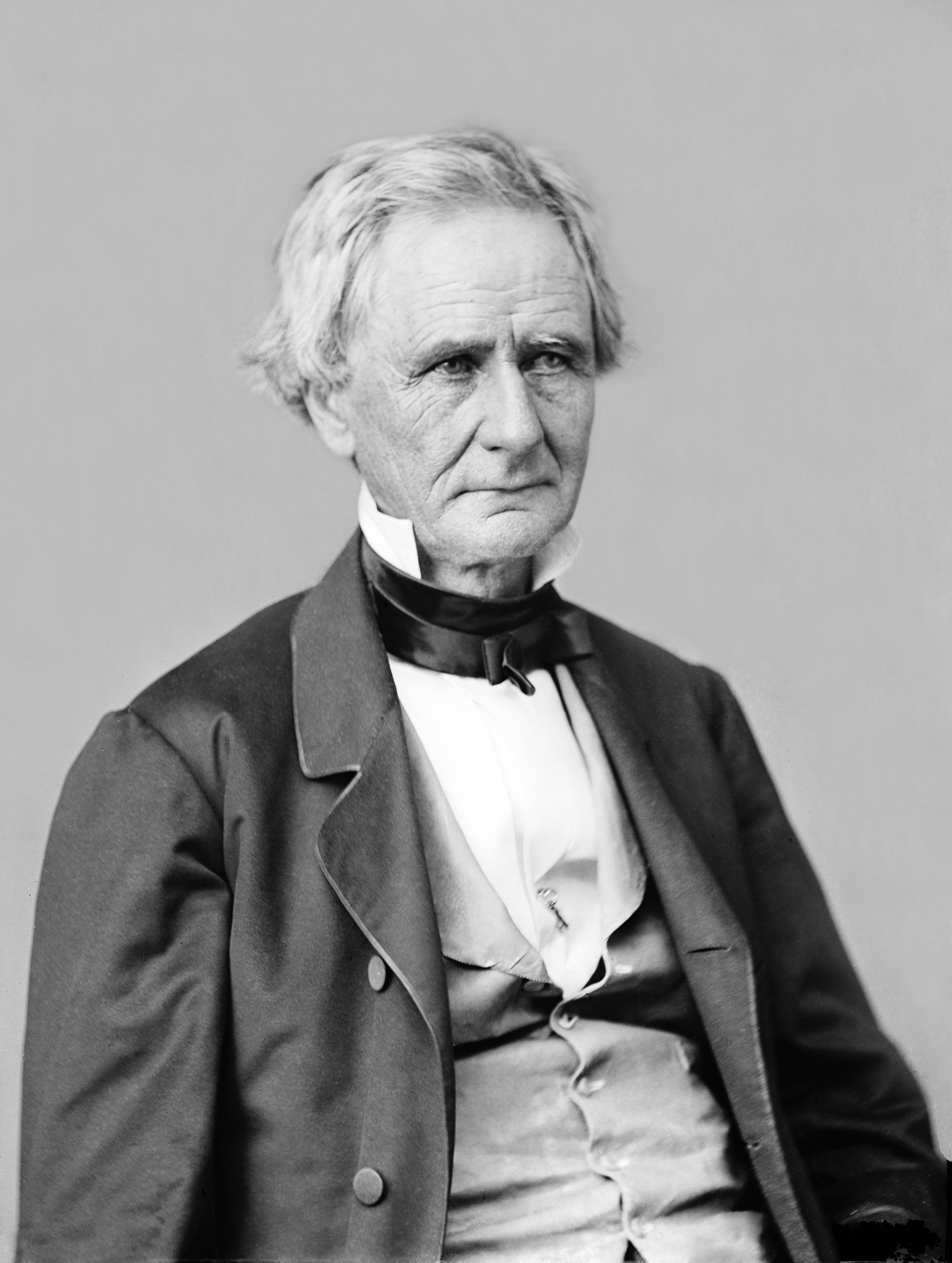
Simon Cameron, namesake of the machine

The state Republican machine of Pennsylvania was first established by Simon Cameron, originally a Jacksonian Democrat who became a Know Nothing and eventually joined the Republican Party. Cameron, who previously in 1845 organized a coalition of Whigs, anti-Catholic activists, and protectionist Democrats that elected him to the Senate, rode the coattails of the rising Republican Party influence around 1860 to form the machine that would prove influential for decades to come.

Previously a businessman, Cameron wielded power over state jobs and contracts to exert and cement his influence after his election to the United States Senate in the 1866 elections. Among patronage decisions, he transacted loans from Middletown Bank to loyal Republicans.

=== Role of machine boss handed from father to son ===
In 1877, J. Donald Cameron became a U.S. senator from Pennsylvania following the resignation of his father. Despite obtaining such an important post in addition to assuming leadership of the elder Cameron's political machine (which resulted in effectively being the Pennsylvania Republican Party "boss"), his political skills were lacking, in addition to charisma. While a consistent party loyalist, Cameron seldom spoke on the Senate floor or introduced legislation.

Although generally quiet, Cameron was outspoken in his support for protective tariffs, a position held by most Republicans.

During the 1880 presidential election, Cameron served as the chairman of the Republican National Committee. Aligned with congressional conservative stalwarts led by Roscoe Conkling, he supported nominating former president Grant to run for an unprecedented, non-consecutive third term.

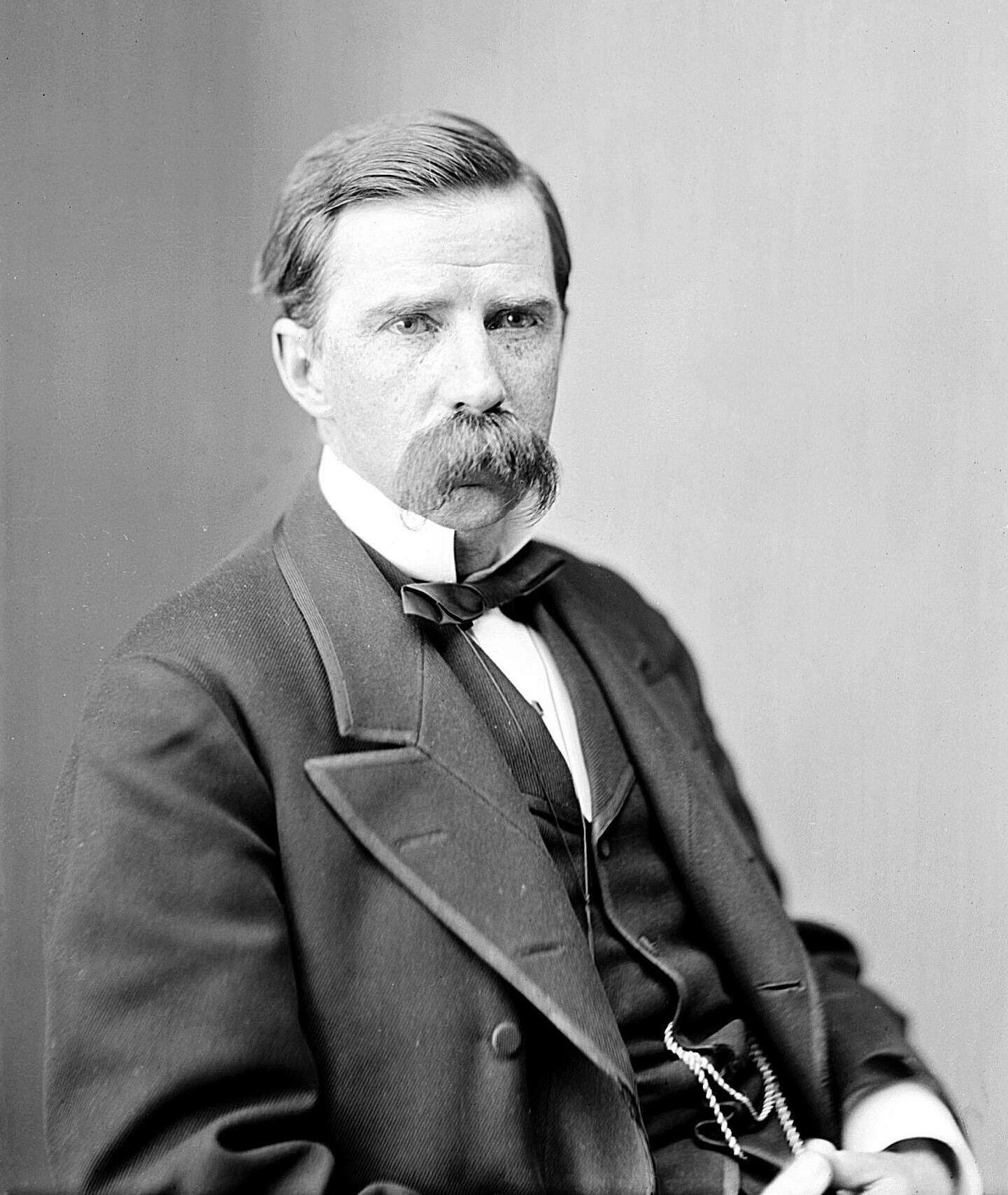
Portrait of Don Cameron

In 1882, factionalism divided the Pennsylvania GOP and handed a victory to Democrats when roughly 40,000 Liberal Republicans, pejoratively deemed "Half-Breeds" by the Republican machine, bolted from the party in the gubernatorial election that year to vote for an "Independent Republican" candidate. Several years later in the mid-1880s, Cameron was replaced as machine leader by Matthew S. Quay, who proved to surpass the former in influence and capabilities.

The Federal Elections Bill of 1890 introduced by conservative Republican Massachusetts congressman Henry Cabot Lodge, Sr., narrowly passed the House by a party-line vote and faced a blockade in the Senate. Western liberal Republicans who advocated bimetallism, later known for forming the Silver Republican Party, opposed the bill under the belief that the stance would draw support from Southern Democrats into their pro-free silver cause, while some Northern pro-business Republicans such as Cameron and Quay emphasized protective tariffs. Although the Pennsylvania senatorial duo did not oppose the legislation, they prioritized the tariff issue and did comparably little to help pass the Lodge bill, which ultimately died as a result of the blockade.

In the 1896–97 elections, Cameron declined to run for another term due to the increasing intraparty power of Quay.

=== Quay replaces Don Cameron as boss ===
Amidst discord among the Pennsylvania GOP, Quay developed a shrewd strategy to prevent another party demise. He raided the state treasury, exerting sharp control over the office and dispensed patronage in the forms of loans to political allies. Quay would state on the matter:

I don't mind losing the governorship or a legislature now and then, but I always need the state treasuryship.

— Quay

==== Quay raids the treasury and executes a developed strategy ====
Although such actions were considered robbery, treasury-raiding was prevalent during the era due to treasurers often being selected by state legislatures. However, growing demands for civil service reform in the 1880s, particularly following the assassination of James A. Garfield, would eventually lead to elections of state treasurers by popular vote. Quay's strategy emphasized three principles:

1. Ensuring his own victory of the Treasurer election.
2. Electing Beaver Governor of Pennsylvania.
3. Getting himself elected U.S. senator from Pennsylvania by the legislature.

In Quay's view, securing a Republican victory in the state treasurer election of 1885 would bolster party efforts in the 1886 midterms, which, if successful, could coalesce a solid party base that sweeps him to victory in 1887. He began in 1885 by meeting with newspapers and independent voters who had opposed the main GOP candidate in the 1882 gubernatorial election, successfully ensuring in most circumstances that they would be supportive or would only voice minimal opposition. The New York Times commented:

. . . Quay had managed during his political life to do a favor for some strong political worker in each district in the State....

— The New York Times, 1885

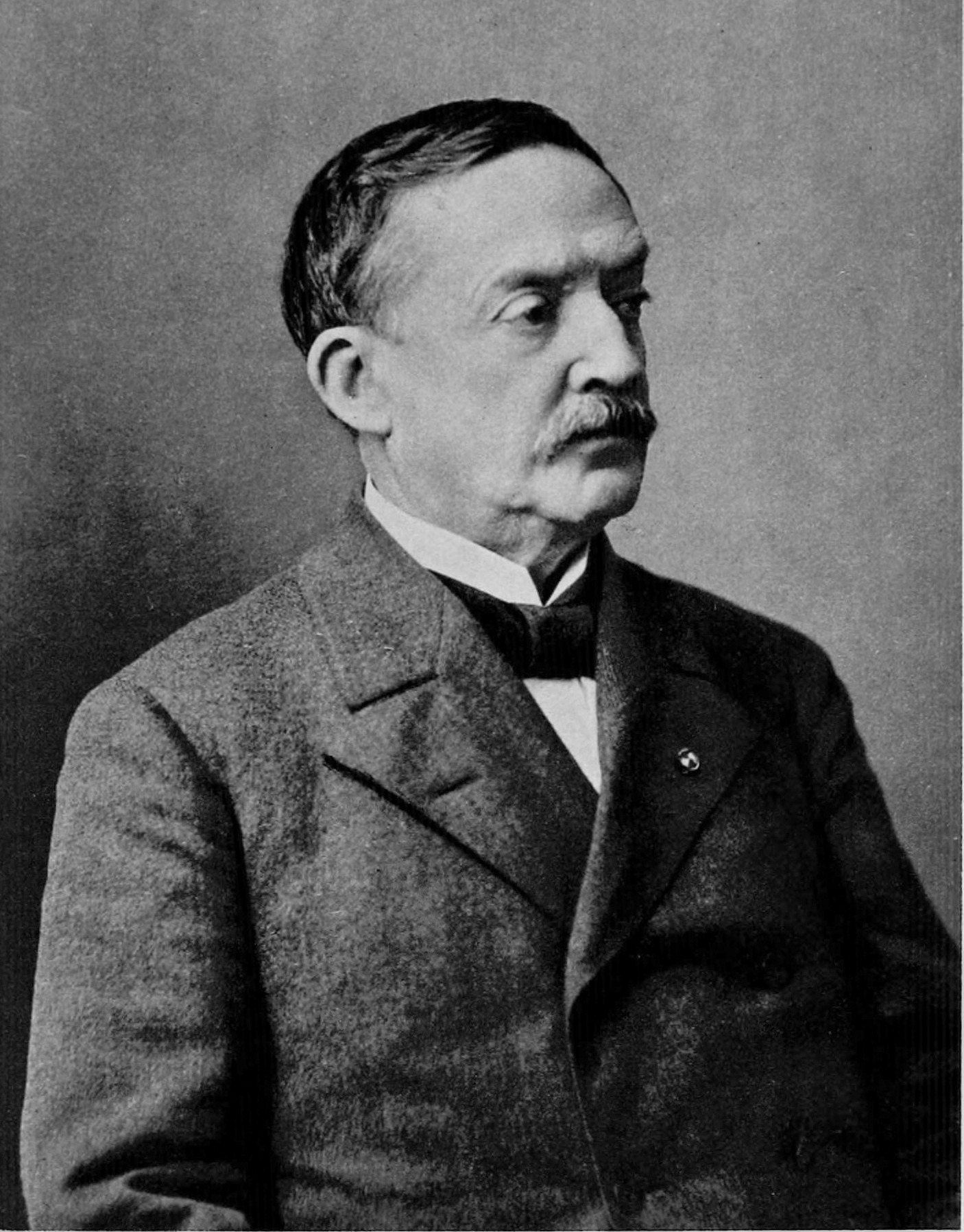
Quay's role as machine boss was marked with shrewdness and corruption.

Following the 1885 victories came spring of 1886, where Quay worked to elect Beaver. Aside advising Beaver to emphasize the protective tariff in speeches, Quay admonished him to remain quiet and stay behind the scenes, asserting:

Your policy is to stand aside and allow the procession to pass until this convention is safely in hand and then only to interfere in case a disaster is imminent.

— Quay to Beaver, 1886

At the GOP convention held in July that year, Beaver clinched the nomination and would proceed to emerge victorious in the general election. Pennsylvania Republicans thus returned to power in the state government, and Quay would be rewarded the following year.

==== U.S. Senate ====
In the 1886–87 midterm elections, Quay ran for and won election to the U.S. Senate, his victory ensured by grateful Republicans in the Pennsylvania legislature. He soon became the leader of the powerful Pennsylvania political machine, replacing the relatively weak leader Donald "Don" Cameron. A newspaper favorable towards the Democratic Party commented:

He is neither orator nor a debator, but a man of good practical sense, an excellent judge of human nature, and is always loyal and true in his friendships.

— Democratic newspaper, 1887

"Practical" referred to a tendency to use "whatever means necessary" in order to be elected and maintain power. "Loyal" meant granting patronage to political allies and followers.

In the Senate, Quay, who had American Indian heritage, notably emerged as a defender of Indian tribes and opposed excluding the Chinese from immigrating to the United States. He voted for higher protective tariffs and bills friendly to business interests, though on other issues maintained an independent streak.

==== Overt corruption ====
The Quay machine employed shrewd patronage tactics in an effort to ensure their power would not face disruption. "Ward heelers," employees of the state and city, were assigned to certain neighborhoods to grant favors for faithful loyalists of the machine. This included the granting of city construction jobs, freeing of juvenile criminals from jails, and rewards in the form of monetary payments or alcohol.

In cities dominated by the coal and steel industries, the Cameron machine solidified its political grip over immigrant residents, many of whom were illiterate. The immigrants were marched to polls with pre-marked ballots and told to vote Republican with the threat of losing their jobs if refusing to follow orders.

==== 1888 elections ====
During the 1888 presidential election, Quay was selected by party leadership to serve as the campaign chairman. New York, run statewide by GOP machine boss Thomas C. "Tom" Platt though controlled in New York City by Democrats, was viewed as a crucial state to target. Due to the fact that New York voted for Bourbon Democrat Grover Cleveland in the previous presidential election cycle, Quay established national headquarters for the GOP campaign in New York City.

On election day, poll watchers were sent by Quay to New York City to inspect Democratic election fraud, ironically concurrent with election fraud also taking place unchecked in Pennsylvania cities controlled by the senator's machine. Quay also started a fund that paid for information leading up to voter fraud convictions, and compiled lists of residents used to determine if voters were "imported" from other states. Republican nominee Benjamin Harrison ultimately won the election, defeating Cleveland.

In the concurrent congressional elections of 1888, Quay ensured a Republican takeover of the U.S. House of Representatives. He funded Republican campaigns in swing Southern districts, where detectives were also sent to safeguard the voting rights of blacks and white Republicans from Democratic Party violence.

==== 1890 elections ====
In the 1890 midterms, Quay proved unable to adapt to the "political winds" of the Pennsylvania GOP leadership and the voter base. There were theoretically at least 14,000 job posts he could have overseen, though likely would have been unable to single-handedly manage all of them. Although Quay knew the importance of putting party unity over personal priorities, he did not follow this principle in 1890 and faced disastrous consequences.

Amidst criticisms by the media of Quay's handling of the treasury, the senator attempted to ram through his personal choice for governor, who lost due to national pressure and pushback from cities in the state. According to A Practical Politician: The Boss Tactics of Matthew Stanley Quay:

Quay needed to control key components in a state. What he could not manage, he would set against each other so they would not unite against him.

— Blair, p. 83

==== Quay maintains GOP patronage through loopholes ====
In 1895, Quay publicly advertised himself as an advocate of reform to bar the "enslavement" of public offices, denouncing "municipal thieves," stated the importance of using public office only for benefiting the public, and opposed influence by public employees in determining their own salaries.

Quay then pushed for four pieces of legislation that would supposedly end such practices, though the bills intentionally left loopholes that let corruption persist.

==== 1899–1901 vacancy ====
In 1899, the Pennsylvania legislature refused to re-elect Quay due to his misappropriation of state funds the previous year. The governor subsequently appointed him to the same post, only for the U.S. Senate refusing to seat Quay by a narrow one-vote margin, with Ohio Republican Mark Hanna pairing against. It took until two years later for Quay to return to his Senate seat, elected in a 1901 special election to the same post.

By the time Quay returned to the Senate, he had lost control of the Pennsylvania GOP machine, which at this point was led by Boies Penrose.
