= Simon Cameron =

American businessman and politician (1799–1889)

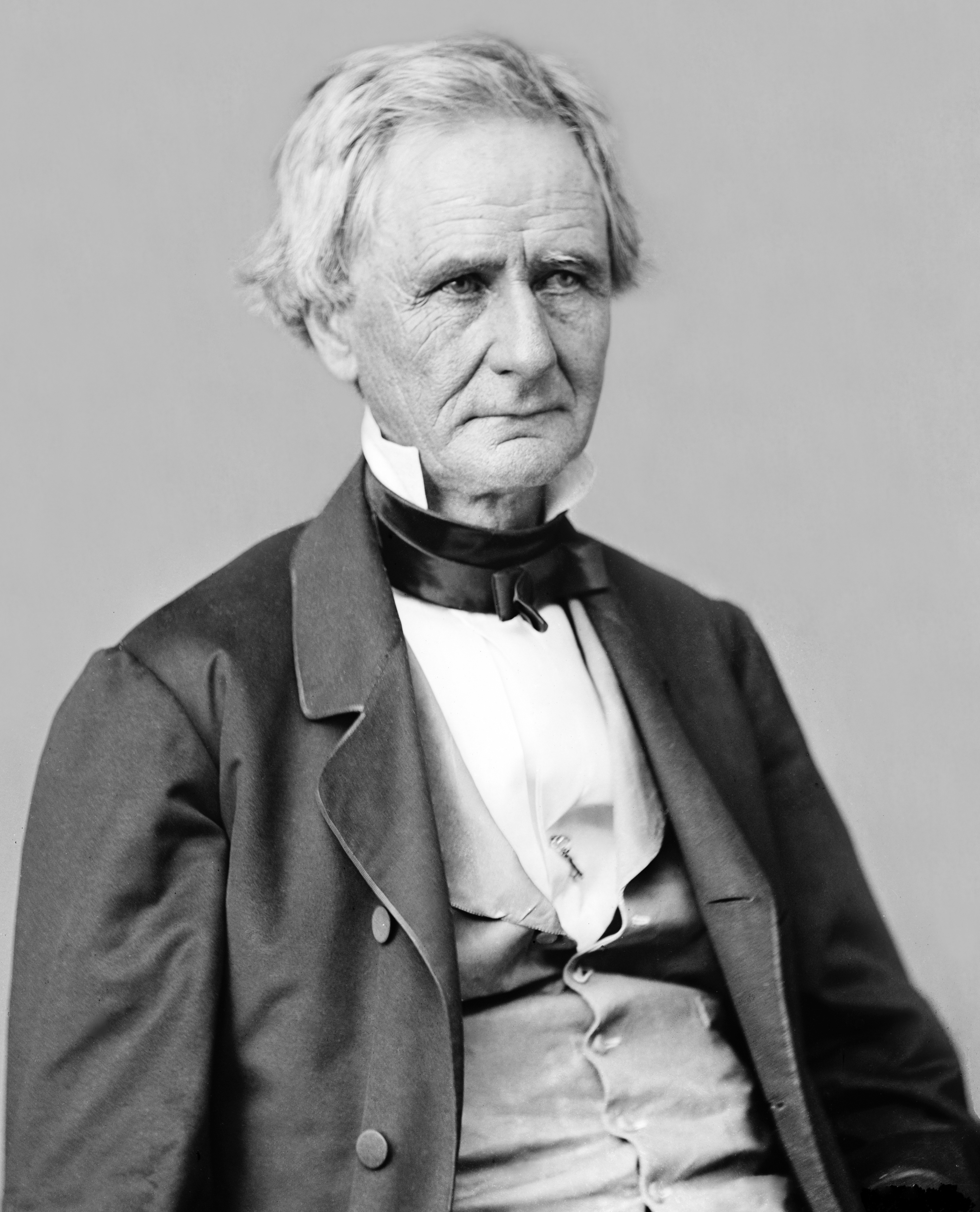
- Cameron, c. 1860–1870

United States Senator from Pennsylvania
- In office March 4, 1867 – March 12, 1877
- Preceded by: Edgar Cowan
- Succeeded by: J. Donald Cameron
- In office March 4, 1857 – March 4, 1861
- Preceded by: Richard Brodhead
- Succeeded by: David Wilmot
- In office March 13, 1845 – March 3, 1849
- Preceded by: James Buchanan
- Succeeded by: James Cooper

Chair of the Senate Foreign Relations Committee
- In office March 10, 1871 – March 12, 1877
- Preceded by: Charles Sumner
- Succeeded by: Hannibal Hamlin

26th United States Secretary of War
- In office March 5, 1861 – January 14, 1862
- President: Abraham Lincoln
- Preceded by: Joseph Holt
- Succeeded by: Edwin Stanton

United States Minister to Russia
- In office January 17, 1862 – February 23, 1863
- President: Abraham Lincoln
- Preceded by: Cassius Marcellus Clay
- Succeeded by: Cassius Marcellus Clay

Personal details
- Born: March 8, 1799 Maytown, Pennsylvania, U.S.
- Died: June 26, 1889 (aged 90) Maytown, Pennsylvania, U.S.
- Resting place: Harrisburg Cemetery
- Party: Democratic (before 1849); American (1849–1856); Republican (1856–1877)
- Spouse: Margaret Brua (m. 1822–1874)
- Children: 10, including J. Donald

Simon Cameron (March 8, 1799 – June 26, 1889) was an American businessman and politician who was four times elected senator from Pennsylvania, and whose involvement in politics spanned over half a century. He served as United States secretary of war under President Abraham Lincoln at the start of the American Civil War.

A native of Maytown, Pennsylvania, Cameron made a fortune in railways, canals, and banking. Initially a supporter of James Buchanan, whom he succeeded in the Senate when Buchanan became Secretary of State in 1845, Cameron broke with Buchanan and the Democratic Party by the 1850s. An opponent of slavery, Cameron briefly joined the Know Nothing Party before switching to the Republicans in 1856. He won election to another term in the Senate in 1857 and provided pivotal support to Lincoln at the 1860 Republican National Convention.

Lincoln appointed Cameron as his first Secretary of War. Cameron's wartime tenure was marked by allegations of corruption and lax management, and he was demoted to minister to Russia in January 1862. He remained there only briefly, and returned to the United States. There, he rebuilt his political machine in Pennsylvania, securing a third term in the Senate in 1867. After ten years in his third stretch in office, he resigned, arranging the election of his son, J. Donald Cameron, in his place. Cameron lived to the age of 90; his machine survived him by several decades, dominating Pennsylvania politics until the 1920s.

== Early life and education ==
Simon Cameron was born in Maytown, Pennsylvania, on March 8, 1799, the third of eight children of Charles Cameron and his wife Martha Pfautz Cameron. Charles Cameron's father, named Simon, had emigrated from Scotland in 1766 to the colonial-era Province of Pennsylvania. A farmer, he continued his trade in Lancaster County and fought with the Continental Army in the Revolutionary War. Martha Cameron was the granddaughter of Hans Michel Pfoutz, one of the first Palatine Germans to emigrate to the Thirteen Colonies.

Charles Cameron was a tailor and tavern keeper in Maytown, but was less than successful in those occupations. In 1808, he moved from Lancaster County north to Sunbury, in Northumberland County, but within two years was living in Lewisburg with his wife, but without his children. He died in January 1811, and his children then boarded with other families. Simon was sent to live with the family of Dr. Peter Grahl, a physician in Sunbury. The Grahls were childless and treated him like their son, and he expanded his rudimentary education in the libraries of Dr. Grahl and his neighbors. In Sunbury, he met and got to know Lorenzo Da Ponte, a librettist for Mozart and other composers. In December 1813, Simon visited Philadelphia with him.

== Prewar career ==
=== Pennsylvania newspapers ===
Simon Cameron was in every respect a self-made man, but many contemporaries, including four presidents, considered the end product worthless.

— Frank Bernard Evans

Soon after his 17th birthday, Cameron apprenticed himself as a printer to Andrew Kennedy, publisher of the Sunbury and Northumberland Gazette and Republican Advertiser. In 1817, Kennedy, who had suffered financial troubles, released Cameron from his indentures, and he went to Harrisburg, where he indentured himself to James Peacock, publisher of the Pennsylvania Republican, the leading Pennsylvania newspaper outside of Philadelphia; after two years' apprenticeship, Cameron was made the newspaper's assistant editor.

Involvement with a newspaper in Harrisburg, the state capital, meant involvement in Pennsylvania politics; in 1842, Cameron said he had attended almost every session of the Pennsylvania General Assembly, the state legislature, since 1817. He met Samuel D. Ingham, the Secretary of the Commonwealth and proprietor of the Doylestown Messenger. Following the departure of its editor, he hired Cameron as his replacement in January 1821. Cameron held this position throughout the year, but the newspaper was not profitable and merged with another local paper, costing Cameron his job.

Cameron next worked as a compositor for the Congressional Globe, a periodical that reported on the Congress. Although it paid little, the work was ideal for a young man interested in politics, allowing him to build contacts with national political figures, including U.S. President James Monroe and U.S. Senator John C. Calhoun of South Carolina. In 1822, Cameron returned to Harrisburg as a partner in the Pennsylvania Intelligencer. He then purchased the Republican and merged it with the Intelligencer, using a loan from an uncle. These enterprises gave Cameron enough security that he felt he could marry; on October 16, 1822, he married Margaret Brua, with whom he had ten children, six of whom reached adulthood.

=== Political involvement ===
In 1823, Cameron's friend John Andrew Shulze was elected Pennsylvania governor, and Cameron spent several years in the profitable post of State Printer. In 1829, Shulze appointed him Adjutant-General of Pennsylvania. His brief term in this position gained him the rank, which he used as a title throughout his life, of general. With his appointment, Cameron, who had sold his stake in the Intelligencer and bought one in the Pennsylvania Reporter and Democratic Herald, divested himself of his interest in the printing trade and ceased to be an active journalist, though he ensured his state contracts would be transferred to his brother James. Shulze also awarded Simon Cameron contracts for the construction of canals in Pennsylvania. Cameron, who founded the Bank of Middletown, became wealthy through banking, canals and railroads.

A delegate from Dauphin County to the Harrisburg State Convention of the Democratic-Republicans in 1824, Cameron was slow to support the presidential candidacy of General Andrew Jackson in the 1824 election, despite Jackson's broad support in Pennsylvania, and only did so because he supported Calhoun for vice president. Secretary of State John Quincy Adams was elected and made Senator Henry Clay of Kentucky his successor at the State Department. In that capacity, Clay was responsible for selecting three printers in each state to print the laws and resolutions of Congress, and since Cameron was not known as an ardent Jacksonian, his firm became one of the official printers. Cameron corresponded extensively with Clay, offering him political advice on Pennsylvania affairs. Adams advocated internal improvements to the nation's transportation infrastructure, financed by high tariffs, policies Cameron supported. By the time the administration lost control of Congress in 1827, Cameron began to gravitate away from Adams and towards Jackson. In doing so, Cameron followed a new political ally, Pennsylvania Congressman James Buchanan. His support for Jackson in his successful run for the presidency in 1828 was only lukewarm.

Cameron's support for Jackson grew in the president's first term, though he was busy with his involvement in banking, founding the Bank of Middletown, and canal and railroad construction. Jackson found Cameron to be a useful lieutenant in Pennsylvania. The president had originally pledged to serve only one term; changing his mind, he enlisted Cameron to get the Pennsylvania legislature to pass a resolution urging him to change his position and run again in 1832. Calhoun had broken with the administration, and Jackson convened the 1832 Democratic National Convention for the main purpose of endorsing a new running mate, Martin Van Buren of New York. Pennsylvania politicians preferred one of their own to run with Jackson, but Cameron arranged a delegation that backed Van Buren, and he was elected along with Jackson. As a reward, Cameron was appointed to the Board of Visitors of the United States Military Academy, though he held the position only briefly. By the mid-1830s, Cameron had built a national reputation in what was becoming known as the Democratic Party.

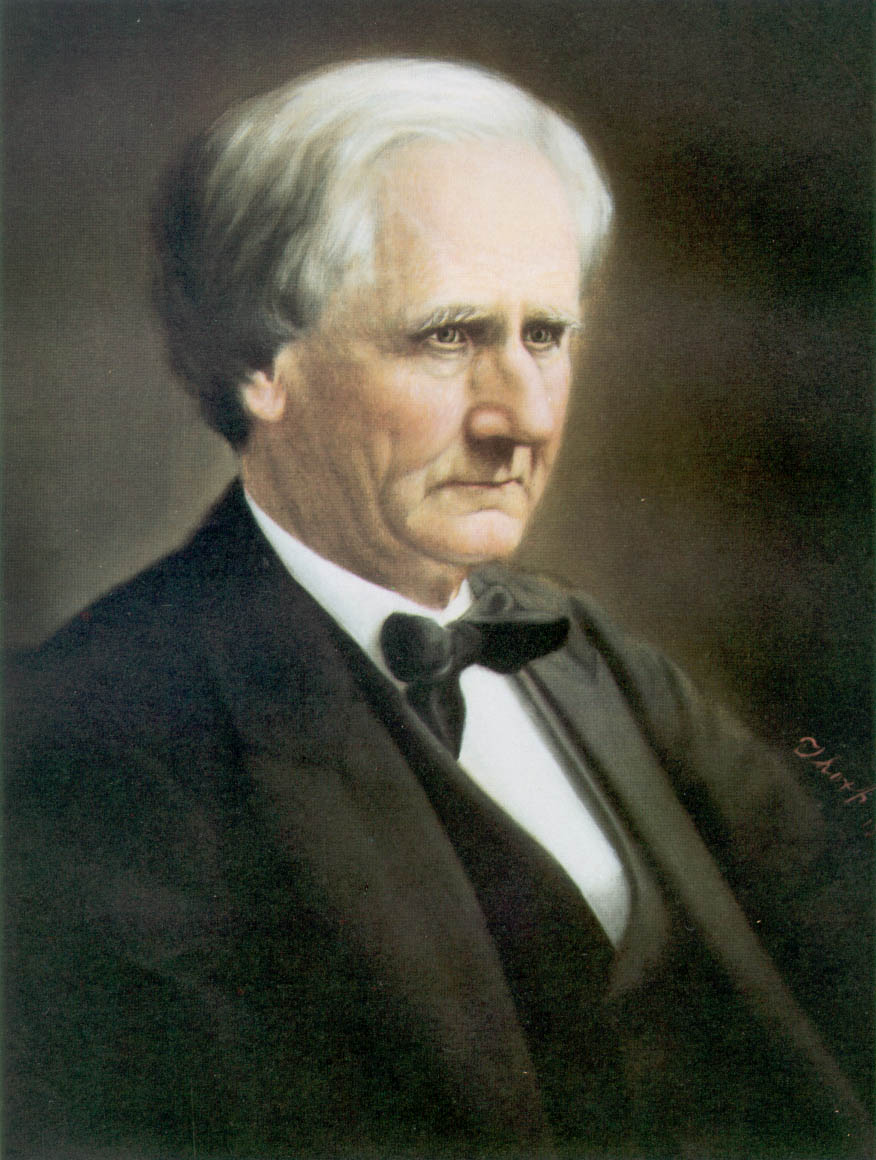
Portrait of Simon Cameron by Freeman Thorpe

Buchanan had left the House of Representatives after 1831, and then served as minister to Russia. When he returned, Cameron tried to get him elected to the Senate in 1833, lobbying the legislature for votes—until 1913, senators were elected by state legislatures. He was not successful, but the following year, Cameron prevailed on Jackson to give Pennsylvania's senior senator, William Wilkins, a diplomatic post, opening a seat that Buchanan might fill. His success in getting Buchanan elected on the fourth ballot pleased both the new senator and Vice President Van Buren, and increased his influence in Washington. Nevertheless, when Cameron sought appointment by Jackson in 1835 as governor of Michigan Territory, he did not get it.

Although he was not a delegate to the 1835 Democratic National Convention, Cameron supported the nomination of Van Buren for president and Congressman Richard M. Johnson of Kentucky for vice president, and campaigned for them; both were elected. Still seeking a federal position, he asked Buchanan for help being appointed a commissioner under the 1837 treaty with the Winnebago Indians, who ceded land in exchange for payments to tribe members as well as to those who had part-Native American descent. The commissioners were to pass on claims by traders to whom recipients were said to owe money. Cameron was named as one of the two commissioners, and in August 1838, journeyed to Prairie du Chien, Wisconsin Territory. There, they adjudicated the traders' claims, and also those of people of part-Native American blood who sought compensation. Many of the latter were represented by whites, and there were allegations of abuses, both at the time and since, though documentary evidence was never presented. According to Cameron biographer Paul Kahan, "the lack of evidence, coupled with the vague assertions of corruption, became a hallmark of this scandal, and it is one of the reasons why it is so hard for historians to assess who was actually telling the truth." According to another biographer, Erwin S. Bradley, "briefly, Cameron's part in the Winnebago affair may be stated as follows: he did exceed his instructions and showed poor business acumen in failing to require bond of the third parties intrusted with the certificates; but the charges ... remain unproved". The impression of corruption long clouded Cameron's reputation, his enemies mocking him, to his anger, as the "Great Winnebago Chief".

Cameron had announced a campaign to be elected to the House of Representatives in 1838, but had abandoned it once he gained the federal appointment. Despite his long political career, this was the closest he ever came to placing his name before the public for a vote. Somewhat shunned after the Winnebago affair, Cameron continued to support Buchanan. The defeat of Van Buren for re-election in 1840 divided Pennsylvania Democrats into those who backed the former president to run again in 1844, and those who supported the administration of Governor David R. Porter. Both Cameron and Senator Buchanan joined the latter camp, and were known as "Improvement Men", and supported continued public improvements, a protective tariff, and the establishment of a state bank. As a supporter of Buchanan, Cameron was strongly opposed to the presidential candidacy of Van Buren in 1844, and supported those at the national convention to require a two-thirds vote to nominate, thus effectively dooming Van Buren's candidacy, though his exact role is uncertain. Cameron was unenthusiastic about the eventual presidential nominee, former Tennessee governor James K. Polk, not liking Polk's ambiguous position on tariffs, and worked for his election in a desultory fashion. Polk won Pennsylvania, and was elected president.

=== United States Senate: First term ===
Pennsylvania elected a governor in 1844, and Democrats had been divided between supporters of Henry A. P. Muhlenberg and of Francis R. Shunk. Muhlenberg got the nomination, but soon thereafter died. Shunk was elected, but former Muhlenberg supporters, including Cameron, feared they would not receive patronage. This divided the party as it prepared to elect a senator in January 1845, and when it became clear that Senator Buchanan would become Polk's Secretary of State, a second seat would also have to be filled.

The factions remained apart as the legislature prepared to fill the seat held by Senator Daniel Sturgeon. Cameron wrote to Buchanan in December 1844, hinting at his interest in the seat, but both factions had candidates in mind. Neither had enough support to be elected by the legislature when it met in January 1845, and as a compromise, Sturgeon was re-elected.

Buchanan resigned following Polk's inauguration in March 1845, and the legislature prepared for an election to fill the remaining four years of his term. Governor Shunk's faction nominated George W. Woodward, as they had to fill Sturgeon's seat, and he gained a majority in the Democratic legislative caucus, though some legislators remained away. Cameron worked to unite the minority of the Democratic Party with the Whigs and Native American Party (or Know Nothings) to gain a majority in the legislature and elect himself. Since the election and especially in his inaugural address, it had become clear that Polk did not support a protective tariff; most of the dissenting Democrats did, as did Cameron and the Whigs. Cameron also held similar views to the Whigs on internal improvements, and found them willing to support him—he hinted to the nativists that he supported increasing the residence time for immigrants to gain citizenship. To the outrage of the mainstream Democratic Party, on March 13, 1845, Cameron was elected on the fifth ballot with 66 votes (including 16 from Democrats), to 55 for Woodward, and six votes scattered.

Cameron began his first term in the Senate with little long-term support in the legislature, since he was alienated from many of the Democrats and was viewed by the Whigs as the lesser evil to Woodward, to be replaced in better times. Alleging that Cameron had gained the seat by corrupt means, the Democratic caucus sent letters to Vice President George M. Dallas (a Pennsylvanian) and also to Buchanan. The two officials, in their replies, refrained from attacking Cameron personally, though they decried the lack of party loyalty which made his election possible. Although nothing came of this, it added to a growing rift between Buchanan and Cameron.

On the day of his election, Cameron wrote to Buchanan, asking him to assure Polk that no one in the Senate would support the administration with more good will than he. Nevertheless, having been elected by uniting disaffected Democrats and the minority parties against the candidate of the Democratic caucus, he found that neither Democrats nor Whigs were willing to fully accept him as a political fellow.

Polk declined to consult Cameron on Pennsylvania federal appointments, though he had been advised to make an ally of him. Angered, Cameron struck back, defeating the nomination of Henry Horn to the lucrative position of Collector of Customs for the Port of Philadelphia. Cameron also defeated the nomination of Woodward to the Supreme Court, the latter likely with Buchanan's help. Polk eventually nominated another Pennsylvanian, Robert C. Grier, as a justice; Grier was confirmed, but the president never forgave Cameron.

Cameron and Polk also differed on the tariff. The Whig-backed Tariff of 1842 was intended to be protectionist, rather than for the sole purpose of raising government revenue, and Polk's administration sought to revise it through the Walker tariff (named for the Secretary of the Treasury, Robert J. Walker, an advocate of free trade). Cameron felt free to oppose it as he owed no debts to Polk and the Pennsylvania legislature had passed a resolution asking the state's congressional delegation to oppose the legislation. He gave a lengthy speech against the tariff in July 1846 opining that it would harm Pennsylvania's iron foundries, and opining that no native of the state could support the bill. This was a comment aimed at Vice President Dallas; nevertheless, Dallas's tie breaking vote in favor paved the way to the bill's enactment.

A longtime supporter of the annexation of Texas, Cameron backed the declaration of war against Mexico and the Mexican–American War. He opposed, however, the annexation of land where slavery might flourish, and supported the Wilmot Proviso (introduced by Pennsylvania Congressman David Wilmot) which would ban slavery from lands gained from Mexico. At the same time, he stated that the people of Pennsylvania had no desire to interfere with slavery in Southern states where it was legal. Cameron's view on slavery prior to 1861 was that it should be the decision of each state or territory whether to be slave or free, but he sought to guard Pennsylvania's interest by limiting the spread of slavery, fearing the effect that slavery would have on white labor. He expected that in due course, Southern states would themselves abolish slavery.

Polk was not a candidate for re-election in 1848, and Secretary of State Buchanan sought the Democratic presidential nomination. Cameron was a delegate from Pennsylvania to the 1848 Democratic National Convention and in common with the state's other delegates, supported Buchanan on each ballot. The nomination went to Michigan Senator Lewis Cass, and Cameron was accused of working behind the scenes to defeat Buchanan. The Whigs nominated General Zachary Taylor of Louisiana for president, with his running mate former congressman Millard Fillmore of New York. In the fall elections, the Pennsylvania Whigs carried the state for Taylor and Fillmore (who were elected), with a majority for their party in both houses of the state legislature. Cameron's term in the Senate was up in 1849; the Whigs wanted to elect one of their own, and many Democrats still resented him. Cameron received no votes in the balloting for senator, in which Whig James Cooper was elected.

=== Return to Pennsylvania ===
Once his term in the Senate expired in March 1849, Cameron returned to Pennsylvania and devoted his time to his business enterprises. This did not mean he cloistered himself from politics; his business activities, including railroads and banking, routinely brought him into contact with politicians, and he retained his interest in public affairs. The Democrats recaptured the state legislature in 1850, and Cameron hoped to succeed Sturgeon in the election the following January, but failed to gain enough votes. The new senator, Richard Brodhead, soon became a political ally of Cameron.

Cameron and Buchanan continued to grow apart, even as Buchanan prepared to seek the 1852 Democratic presidential nomination. In 1850, trying to diminish any southern support the former secretary might get, Cameron sent Mississippi Senator Jefferson Davis a thirty-year-old news article showing that Buchanan had signed an anti-slavery petition. In response, Buchanan had friendly newspapers attack Cameron. The two battled at the 1851 Democratic state convention which nominated William Bigler for governor. Pennsylvania's delegation to the 1852 Democratic National Convention, which included Cameron, was instructed to vote for Buchanan, but Cameron worked for the nomination of Cass and the dissent in his home state's ranks hurt Buchanan's chances. The nomination went to former New Hampshire senator Franklin Pierce. Once elected, Pierce declined to return Buchanan to the cabinet, and Cameron was successful in getting a number of his allies federal positions.

Pennsylvania's next Senate election was in 1855; in the 1854 legislative elections, the Whigs won a majority, which would ordinarily make it very difficult for Cameron to regain the seat. Many members of both the Whig and Democratic Parties were Know Nothings, who sought restrictions on immigration and immigrants, but who also, in the North, opposed the spread of slavery, an issue on which Cameron might find common ground with them. In addition, being a party with few prominent leaders, it was a route to political power for Democrats who wished to avoid Buchanan's hold on the state party, especially after the Kansas–Nebraska Act of 1854 cost the party support in the North.

Cameron worked to appeal to the Know Nothing caucus. When the caucuses met in early 1855, Cameron was the choice of the Know Nothing caucus, but disputes about voting meant about half the caucus left and refused to be bound by the outcome. When the legislature voted on February 13, 1855, Cameron had a plurality, but not a majority. Faced with a deadlock, the legislature postponed the senatorial election until the next legislature met in 1856, allowing Governor James Pollock to make a temporary appointment. When the 1856 legislature met, the Democrats had a majority, and Cameron did not attempt to win the seat, which went to Bigler.

=== Second term in the Senate ===
The factions that opposed the Democrats and the Kansas-Nebraska Act began to coalesce by 1856 into what became known as the Union Party, or Republican Party. Cameron was aligned with many of the new party's views and also saw an opportunity to return to the Senate. He was prominent at many of the meetings that shaped the new party. He attended the 1856 Republican National Convention that nominated former California senator John C. Frémont for president. With Buchanan the Democratic nominee for president, and Pennsylvania a crucial state in the election, Cameron was considered as Frémont's running mate, but William Dayton of New Jersey was chosen. Buchanan won Pennsylvania by fewer than three thousand votes, and Frémont blamed this on the decision not to choose Cameron. The Democrats gained a narrow majority in the Pennsylvania legislature against the combined forces of the Republicans and Know Nothings.

Once the presidential election was over, Republicans considered how to obtain the Democratic votes needed to gain the senatorship. Cameron had the support of Wilmot and of Thaddeus Stevens of Pennsylvania, who were convinced Cameron could win. Cameron kept his plans as quiet as possible; unnerved by rumors and the memories of Cameron's controversial victory in 1845, Democrats nominated John W. Forney, a journalist and loyal Democrat. Forney had gotten President-elect Buchanan to write a letter of support to show to legislators, but there were three Democratic members who disliked Buchanan and the letter helped them decide to vote for Cameron. They secretly met with Cameron's managers, who told the Republicans and Know Nothing legislators that there would be Democratic votes, and obtained an agreement to support Cameron on the first ballot. In the election on January 13, 1857, Cameron was elected without a vote to spare, to the shock of many legislators and observers. The three Democrats were expelled from their hotels in Harrisburg, and each lost his re-election bid.

The election of Cameron, given the Democratic majority in the legislature, was seen as a great victory for the Republicans, and an embarrassment for President-elect Buchanan. The Democrats alleged bribery, and the legislature formed a committee to investigate, but the majority found no evidence to substantiate any charges. Similarly, shortly after Cameron's swearing-in, Senator Bigler presented a petition signed by 59 members of the legislature asking the Senate to investigate the circumstances of Cameron's election, but the Senate soon dropped the matter, finding there was no proof of wrongdoing. Nevertheless, like the Winnebago matter, the circumstances of the 1857 election gave Cameron a reputation for corruption that proved impossible to shake.

Cameron quickly became one of the leaders of the Republican minority in the Senate. He returned to a Senate far less congenial than the body he had left eight years before, with members deeply divided over slavery. Nevertheless, he maintained friendships with Southern senators. The divisions manifested themselves during the Senate's debate over whether to adopt Buchanan's recommendation that Kansas Territory be admitted to the Union under the pro-slavery Lecompton Constitution. Cameron engaged in a verbal battle in March 1858 with Missouri's James S. Green, during which each called the other a liar, and Green suggested the two should fight a duel. The matter was settled, as was usual in such cases, with formal apologies before the Senate. Remembering the recent beating of Charles Sumner, Cameron made a pact with Zachariah Chandler of Michigan and Benjamin F. Wade of Ohio that they would take each other's part in another such incident.

Cameron's view concerning slavery remained much as it had during his first term in the Senate. He opposed its spread, believing it to be against Pennsylvania's interest for it to do so, but thought Congress had no power to do anything about it where it already existed. He also, beginning in about 1859, employed as a servant an escaped slave named Tom Chester. Cameron arranged for him to be educated; he later emigrated to Liberia and became that country's minister to Russia.

Although like most Republican senators, Cameron distrusted Buchanan, he supported the administration when the president asked for funds for troops in case there should be conflict with members of the Church of Jesus Christ of Latter-day Saints in Utah Territory. Republicans feared Buchanan would use the troops to support pro-slavery elements in Kansas. Cameron was one of only four Republicans to vote in favor. In 1858, Cameron campaigned for the Republicans in Pennsylvania, who were rewarded with control of the state House of Representatives, although Democrats maintained a one-vote majority in the state Senate. Democrats previously had a majority of Pennsylvania's seats in the federal House of Representatives; they were reduced to five out of twenty-five seats. Continued victories in the 1859 state elections magnified Cameron's status in Pennsylvania.

=== Election of 1860 ===
==== Presidential nomination ====
Potential candidates for the 1860 Republican nomination surround the favorite, Seward. Cameron is at right in middle row; Lincoln at bottom, second from left.

The year 1860 was a presidential election year, and Cameron sought the nomination, believing that Pennsylvania's strength at the nominating convention would be sufficient to win. Not all Pennsylvania Republicans supported Cameron, and there were rumors that he had made a deal with the Democrats, or that his candidacy was a stalking horse to build support for the frontrunner, New York Senator William H. Seward. This was supported by a visit Seward had paid to Harrisburg in 1859, in which he had been feted by Cameron. Afterwards, Seward had written to his political manager, Thurlow Weed, that Cameron had promised the ultimate support of the Pennsylvania delegation, though it might initially vote for Cameron. The rumors that Cameron would support Seward were damaging since the New Yorker's abolitionist leanings limited his support among Pennsylvania's conservative voters. Kahan suggested that the fact that Cameron hosted both Seward and another presidential hopeful, Governor Salmon P. Chase of Ohio, in 1859, meant that he was trying to keep good relations with the major contenders for the nomination and place himself in a position to be a kingmaker. There was little support for Cameron outside of Pennsylvania. One of the other contenders, former US Representative Abraham Lincoln of Illinois, played down suggestions Lincoln might take second place on a ticket led by Cameron. Lincoln's supporters discussed the possibility of Cameron as vice presidential candidate, hoping it might win the crucial state of Pennsylvania.

The year also would see elections for governor of Pennsylvania, and for a legislature that would choose who would fill Senator Bigler's seat. In February 1860, the party state convention endorsed Cameron as Pennsylvania's favorite son candidate for the Republican nomination for president, and chose Andrew Curtin as gubernatorial candidate. There was a strong dislike between the two men, and their supporters, but no one wanted a breach within the party. Curtin had little appetite for a deal between Cameron and Seward, since if Seward headed the ticket, his unpopularity in Pennsylvania might affect Curtin's own election.

In mid-March, Cameron told Seward that he wanted to meet with Weed in advance of the 1860 Republican National Convention in May in Chicago. Confident that Seward would gain the nomination, and of Cameron's support, Weed did not meet with Cameron. Kahan suggested that if the two had met, Cameron would have demanded a cabinet seat for his support, something Weed wanted to avoid.

In Chicago, supporters of his rivals worked to stop a Seward victory on the first ballot, and selected Lincoln as the candidate with the most support. Although Lincoln had instructed his people to make no deals that would bind him, his manager, David Davis, reasoned that Lincoln, not present at the convention, was in no position to judge what had to be done to get him the nomination, and would have to fulfill whatever deals they made. It is unclear if an explicit deal was made to bring Cameron aboard the Lincoln bandwagon, but at the minimum, Davis and others pledged that Cameron would be treated as generously as if he had supported Lincoln from the start. William Herndon, Lincoln's law partner, later wrote that Davis and his fellow managers "negotiated with the Indiana and Pennsylvania delegations and assigned places in the cabinet to Simon Cameron and Caleb Smith, beside making other 'arrangements' which [Davis] expected Mr. Lincoln to ratify. Of this he [Lincoln] was undoubtedly unaware."

According to Bradley, Cameron could not have delivered the delegation to Seward had he wanted to, given the opposition to the New Yorker in the state. On the first ballot, a divided Pennsylvania delegation came together to cast 47 1/2 votes of 54 for Cameron, as Seward had a plurality, with Lincoln behind him and Cameron third. On the second ballot, Lincoln received 48 votes from Pennsylvania, as he almost erased Seward's lead. On the third, on which Lincoln was nominated, Lincoln's Pennsylvania vote increased to 52.

==== Campaign ====
The understanding between Lincoln's backers and Cameron's became public almost at once, one newspaper printing that the senator had been promised the Treasury Department. In the campaign, Cameron was a strong supporter of Lincoln, stating that he welcomed Lincoln's nomination "in a most cordial and emphatic manner". In August, Cameron wrote to the presidential candidate, pledging that Pennsylvania would vote for him, and "the state is for you and we all have faith in your good intentions to stand by her interests". Cameron also sent a contribution of $800 to Davis. To establish his soundness on the tariff question, which was important in Pennsylvania, Lincoln had Davis show Cameron excerpts from speeches he had given in the 1840s; Cameron wrote to Lincoln that he was pleased with their content. Cameron also campaigned for Curtin, though antagonism between the two continued.

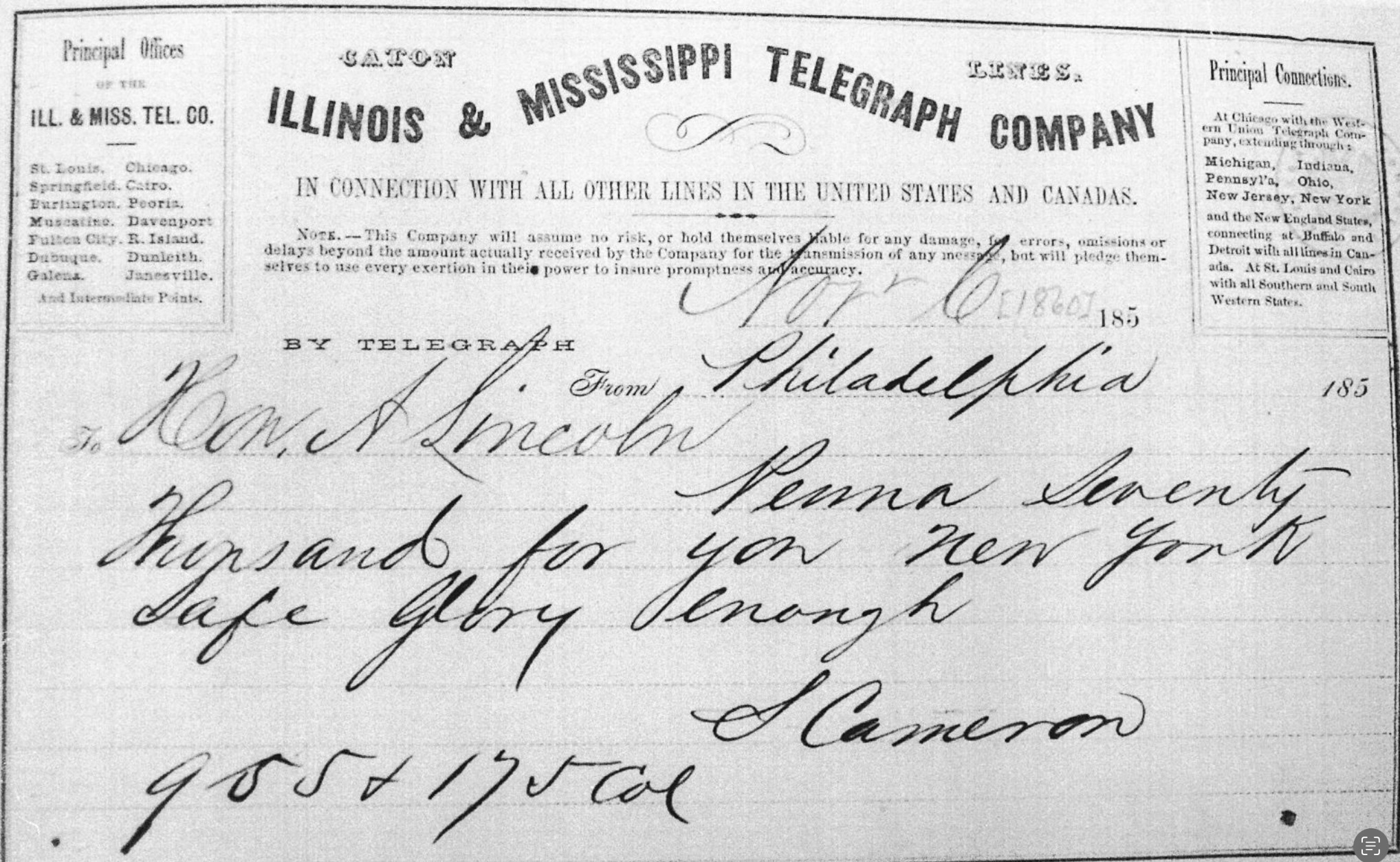
Congratulatory telegram received by Lincoln from Cameron, 1860

On October 9, 1860, Pennsylvania state elections were held. Curtin was easily elected, and Republicans increased their margins in both houses of the legislature. This meant that Senator Bigler would almost certainly be replaced by a Republican, and if Cameron resigned to accept high office, his successor would also be a Republican. Republican Party leaders did not rest on their state laurels but pressed for a heavy majority for Lincoln. On Election Day, November 6, 1860, Republicans flipped Pennsylvania to their party, something confirmed by a telegram to Lincoln's headquarters in Springfield, Illinois after midnight, "Hon. A. Lincoln: Pennsylvania, 70,000 for you. New York safe, Glory enough. S. Cameron."

== Secretary of War ==
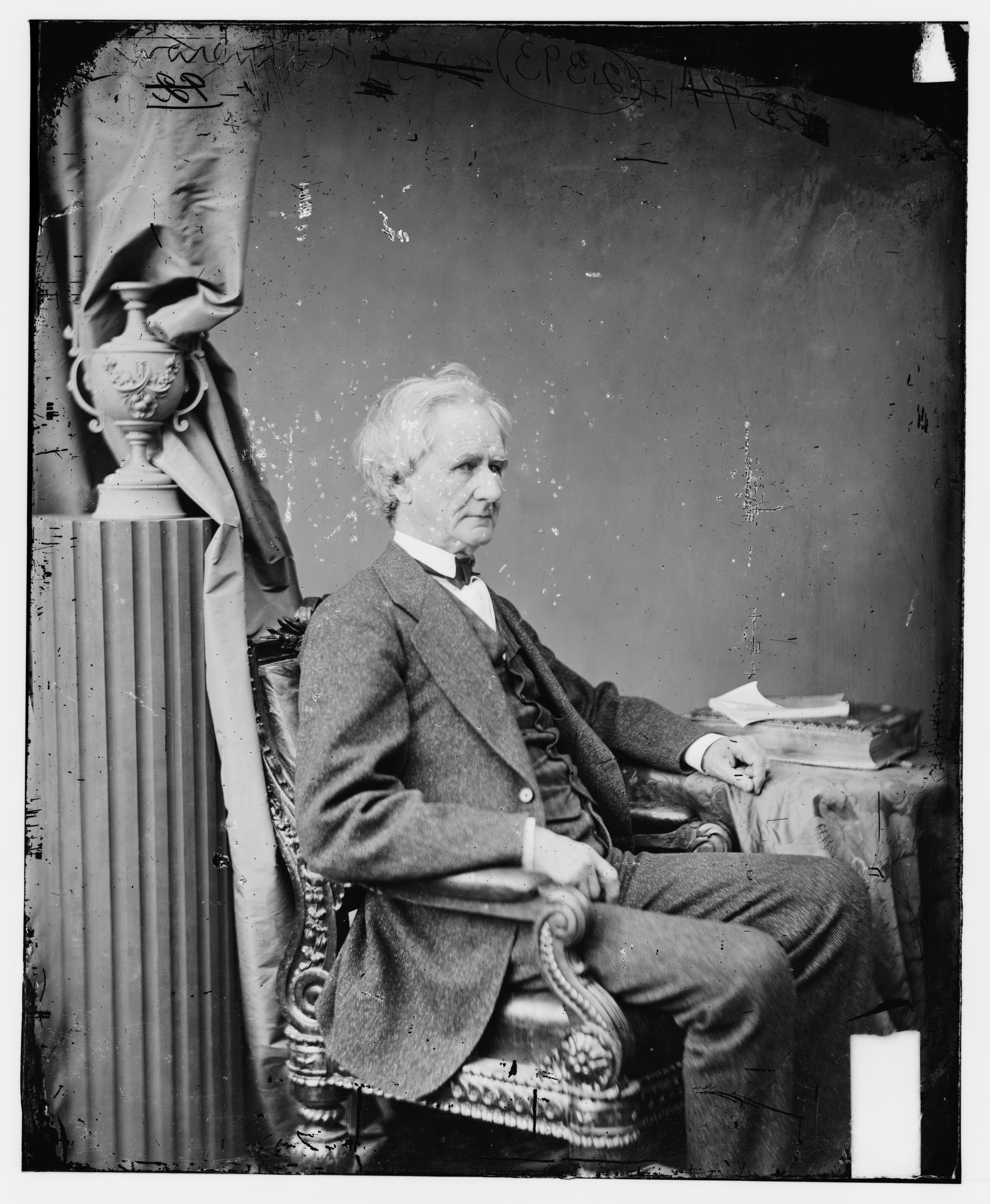
Simon Cameron

=== Appointment ===
In drafts Lincoln made of his cabinet following his election to the presidency, Cameron was omitted. Given the divisions between Cameron and Curtin supporters in Pennsylvania, Lincoln planned to exclude Cameron from the cabinet, hoping both factions would accept Dayton, like Cameron a strong protectionist. Within days, though, Lincoln began receiving many letters urging him to make Cameron Secretary of the Treasury.

Lincoln may still have been unaware of the understanding made at the convention; his advisor, Leonard Swett, wrote to Cameron on November 27, 1860, that Lincoln was not bound by any such bargain. Swett sent a copy to the president-elect, who did nothing initially, but asked Weed for his view on Cameron on December 20. Cameron had reneged on his support for Seward, Weed's candidate, and Weed advised excluding Cameron in favor of a trustworthy Southerner. Cameron would not visit Lincoln's hometown of Springfield without an invitation, and, after sending Swett to Pennsylvania to confer with him, Lincoln felt compelled to invite Cameron, who arrived on December 30, 1860. Others urged Lincoln to leave Cameron out of the cabinet, citing the Winnebago affair or the allegations of bribery in his elections to the Senate; former Representative George N. Eckert wrote, "I wish to say to you that under no circumstances or contingency will it answer to even dream of putting Simon Cameron in the Cabinet. He is corrupt beyond belief. He is rich by plunder—and can not be trusted any where."

Upon his arrival in Springfield, Cameron met with Lincoln for several hours, first at the president-elect's law office and then at the senator's hotel. Both men were personable in nature, and the meetings were enjoyable; at their conclusion, Lincoln offered Cameron a place in the cabinet, either as Secretary of the Treasury or Secretary of War. At Cameron's request, Lincoln gave him the offer in writing, which he regretted soon thereafter, as no sooner had Cameron left town than a fresh flood of anti-Cameron communications came to him. Lincoln met with Alexander McClure, a leader of the Curtin faction. The president-elect wrote to withdraw the offer, asking Cameron to keep it confidential, unless he chose to publicly decline, in which case he had no objection to the offer being made public. One reason for Lincoln's about-face was that he had asked Cameron to keep the offer confidential, which he had not done. Cameron complained to Lincoln's associates about the president-elect's conduct, but did and said nothing publicly, and in fact arranged for Lincoln and his family to use a luxurious Pennsylvania Railroad car for the journey to Washington.

In early January, after meeting with Chase, whom he wanted in the cabinet, Lincoln told two of his advisors, "I am in a quandary. Pennsylvania is entitled to a cabinet office. [I have received] hundreds of letters, and the cry is 'Cameron, Cameron!' ... The Pennsylvania people say: 'If you leave out Cameron you disgrace him.'" Lincoln decided not to offer Cameron the Treasury post, but to hold out the possibility of another appointment. On January 13, Lincoln sent Cameron a letter stating he meant no offense by the previous letter, and stating that he had no doubt Cameron would perform the duties of a cabinet secretary "ably and faithfully". Cameron continued to press Lincoln by displaying the December 31 letter offering a post without showing the January 3 one rescinding the offer. With much of Lincoln's cabinet undetermined by the end of January, Herndon wrote, "Lincoln is in a fix. Cameron's appointment ... bothers him. If Lincoln do[es] appoint Cameron, he gets a fight on his hands, and if he do[es] not he gets a quarrel deep-abiding, & lasting ... Poor Lincoln! God help him!"

At the behest of Cameron supporters Lincoln met with, the president-elect offered another meeting in Springfield, but Cameron refused, and the matter was still unresolved when Lincoln left for Washington, D.C. When the train passed through Pittsburgh, Lincoln was met with a group of Cameron supporters who insisted he be appointed to the cabinet. In Philadelphia, other Cameron backers buttonholed Lincoln, both in the lobby of his hotel and at his room. Tired of this, he hinted he might keep holdovers from the Buchanan cabinet rather than appoint Cameron.

Cameron's opponents in Pennsylvania, likely out of fear the state would go unrepresented in the cabinet, dropped their opposition to him. When Lincoln stopped in Philadelphia, a group of supporters of Governor Curtin told him that Curtin now supported Cameron's cabinet bid. Lincoln still made no decision until after he reached Washington, when after much soul-searching he decided to appoint Cameron to the cabinet. Cameron still wanted the Treasury position, which went to Chase, and only reluctantly accepted War. After discussions between the two on February 28 and March 1, 1861, Lincoln nominated Cameron to be Secretary of War on March 5, 1861, the day after he took office as president. Despite having borne the title of "general" for over thirty years, Cameron knew nothing of military science.

=== Tenure ===
Cameron was sworn in as Secretary of War on March 12, 1861. The week's delay in swearing-in was because Cameron was in Pennsylvania and has been taken by some historians to mean that, even amid the rapidly worsening secession crisis, Cameron did not take his new position seriously. Kahan pointed out that at Lincoln's first cabinet meeting, on March 6, there was no mention of the increasingly desperate situation at Fort Sumter. At the cabinet meeting of March 15, Lincoln asked his cabinet members for their views on Sumter, and Cameron stated that the fort, isolated in the harbor of seceded Charleston, South Carolina, should not be resupplied since it could not be held indefinitely. Cameron served in the position of War Secretary for only just over ten months; he has been harshly judged by historians for corruption in the department and a lack of competence in the position; Kahan pointed out that he left the Army and the War Department better off to meet the demands of war than at the start of his tenure.

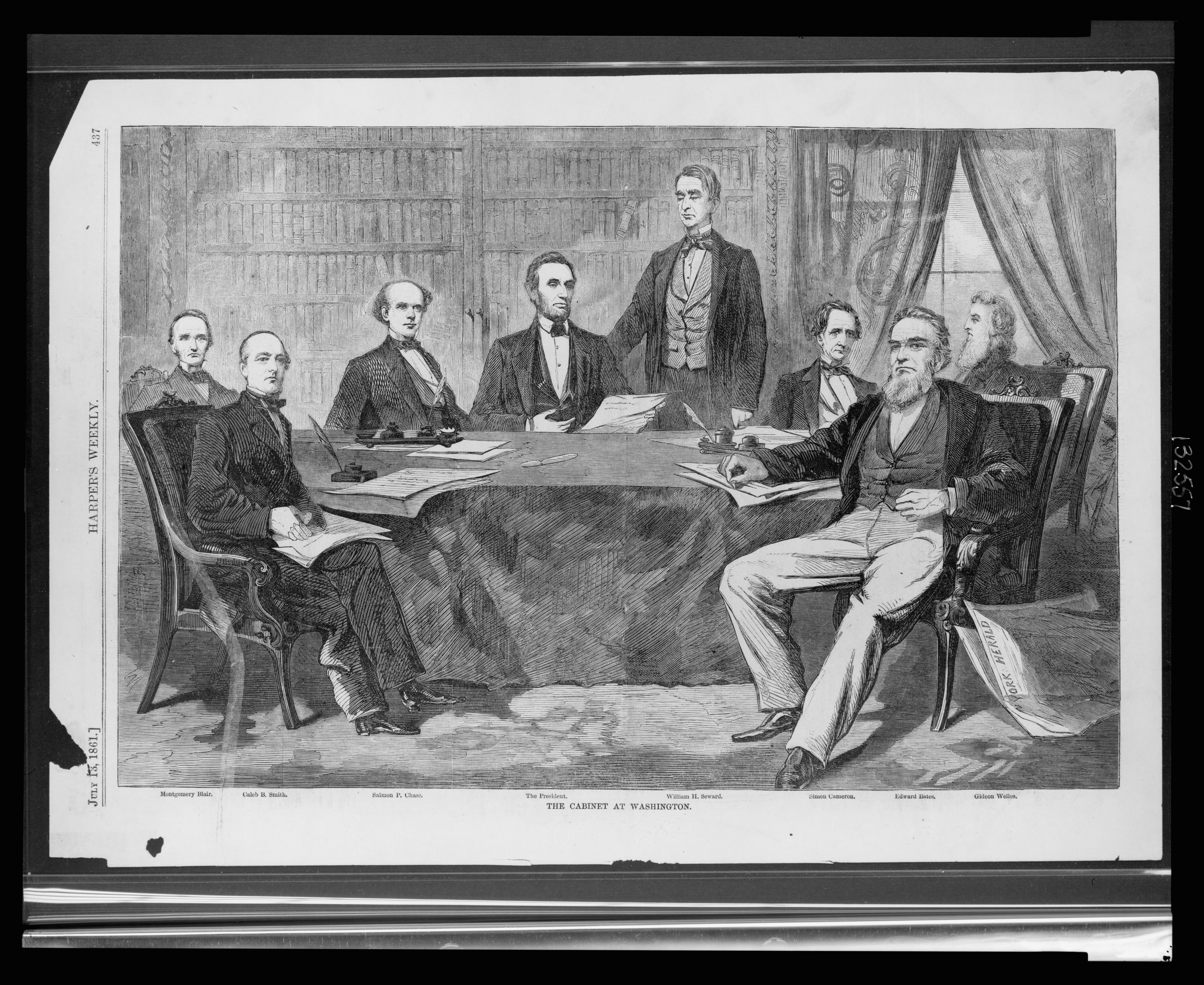
Harper's Weekly depicts Lincoln's first cabinet. Cameron is third from right.

In spite of this, Cameron faced a difficult and chaotic situation in his new position. He led a War Department of 90 employees which administered an army of 17,000, and a proportion of each could not be counted on to support the Union. Expanding each to meet the needs of wartime was a huge task, for which Cameron's skills in business and politics proved inadequate. Volunteers from the North poured into Washington, but Cameron and the War Department had no guns, nor bullets, nor uniforms to give them. Cameron later stated, "I was certainly not in a place to be envied." He sought assistance from fellow cabinet members. Seward, the Secretary of State, was willing to help, but showed a tendency to take over entirely, leading to a scene greatly enjoyed by Lincoln during which an angry Cameron cowed Seward. After that, Cameron preferred to ask Chase for advice, and to supervise his department when Cameron was absent from Washington.

There was considerable pressure on the administration to defeat the Confederacy; Speaker of the House Galusha Grow threatened Cameron that unless the South was brought to battle, "you will be as powerless in thirty days as you are now powerful." Despite protests from the commander, General Irvin McDowell, that his troops were not ready, in July 1861, Union troops attacked at the First Battle of Bull Run. This proved a resounding Union defeat, and Cameron's brother James was killed. Bull Run, and other Union defeats, led to considerable criticism of the cabinet, of which the bulk was directed at Cameron. On the day of Bull Run, Cameron wrote to Chase that the silver lining of the defeat was that they would now have the full cooperation of Congress, and he had "no fear of the ultimate result" of the war.

Cameron failed to keep adequate records of what he was doing in awarding military contracts; often the only record, if not entirely entrusted to Cameron's memory, was notes he placed in his pocket. He also allowed special agents who were not government officials to contract on behalf of the department. Millions of dollars passed through the hands of these special agents. Although many of these men did their work competently, for which they were not compensated, others proved corrupt, such as Cameron's lieutenant, Alexander Cummings, who spent a quarter million dollars, much of which was wasted. In April 1862, after leaving the cabinet, Cameron was censured by the House of Representatives for letting inappropriate, unsupervised contracts.

Cameron's reputation for dispensing political spoils made him an especial target of office seekers in the early days of the war, and Cameron friends, relatives and former constituents all received commissions or jobs, leading to an outcry from critics. Complaints that Cameron was corrupt were brought to Lincoln, including from disappointed office seekers and would-be contractors; Lincoln stated he would fire Cameron if his dishonesty was proved. This did not occur, proving, according to Kahan, that Cameron, though overwhelmed by the situation, was not himself a crook.

=== Ouster ===
By late 1861, there was considerable pressure on Lincoln to fire Cameron. Although it had not been shown that Cameron profited from the corruption in the War Department, he was deemed guilty of allowing it. Lincoln had come to realize that he had erred in appointing Cameron to a position to which he was not suited. Cameron, though, wanted to stay in his position, and increasingly allied with the Radical Republicans in Congress, for whom the primary purpose of the war was slavery's end. Both the radicals and Secretary Chase believed that the North should enlist and arm escaped slaves, and Cameron came to adhere to that position, which was not shared by Lincoln or the other members of the cabinet.

Matters came to a head with the annual report that department heads were required to submit to the president as the basis of the State of the Union message to Congress. Cameron had a paragraph inserted in his report stating that freed slaves should be used to help put down the rebellion. Cameron acted with the approval of his legal advisor, Edwin M. Stanton. Knowing that the paragraph would be taken to denote the administration's policy, Cameron had copies sent in advance to the post office. The printer realized that the text would be controversial and consulted the White House. Believing it was his prerogative to decide when to emancipate the slaves, Lincoln had the paragraph removed and the original copies recalled. Nevertheless, word got out in early January 1862.

On January 11, 1862, Lincoln sent Cameron a brusque letter dismissing him and offering him the position of United States Minister to Russia. Cameron showed it to Chase, and the two consulted with Seward. Chase and Seward persuaded Lincoln to withdraw the letter and substitute a warmer one that made it appear that Cameron was being given a diplomatic post at his own request. Cameron, who resigned on January 13, though he stayed on until the 20th, was replaced by Stanton.

== Minister to Russia ==
Lincoln's nomination of Cameron to be Minister to Russia was confirmed by the Senate on January 14, 1862, 28–14, after a good deal of work by the chair of the Senate Foreign Relations Committee, Charles Sumner of Massachusetts, and over the opposition of Lyman Trumbull of Illinois. Cameron had no great desire to go to Russia, and tried to get a diplomatic post for his successor in the Senate, Wilmot, so he could regain the seat for himself, but nothing came of the idea. On May 7, 1862, Cameron, his wife Margaret Cameron, two of their children, his private secretary, and the secretary of the legation, Bayard Taylor, departed New York aboard the ship Persia. Once in Europe, Cameron took a circuitous route through Great Britain, France, Belgium, the Netherlands and Germany, allowing much time for sightseeing and receptions, and did not arrive in the Russian capital of St. Petersburg until June 15. He was presented to Alexander II by the departing minister, Cassius M. Clay, on June 25.

Cameron found himself with time on his hands in St. Petersburg. He disliked the city and its climate, and bilateral relations remained good after quiet US support for the Russians during the Crimean War. Secretary of State Seward had instructed Clay to ensure that he left Cameron with little to do. Clay was leaving to take up a generalship in the Union Army, but was already reconsidering and had written to Lincoln that Cameron would not remain long, and asking for his position back.

That was the case; Cameron was eager to salvage his political career and rebut the allegations of mismanagement that had been made against him. He requested a furlough from Seward. Though this was initially denied, he left anyway in September, citing his desire to accompany Margaret Cameron, who he stated was in poor health and unable to bear the upcoming Russian winter. Seward retroactively ratified this departure, and the Camerons returned home in early November. Taylor was left in charge; Cameron promised to try to make him his successor as minister, but when Cameron formally resigned on February 23, 1863, Lincoln reappointed Clay.

== Return to the Senate ==
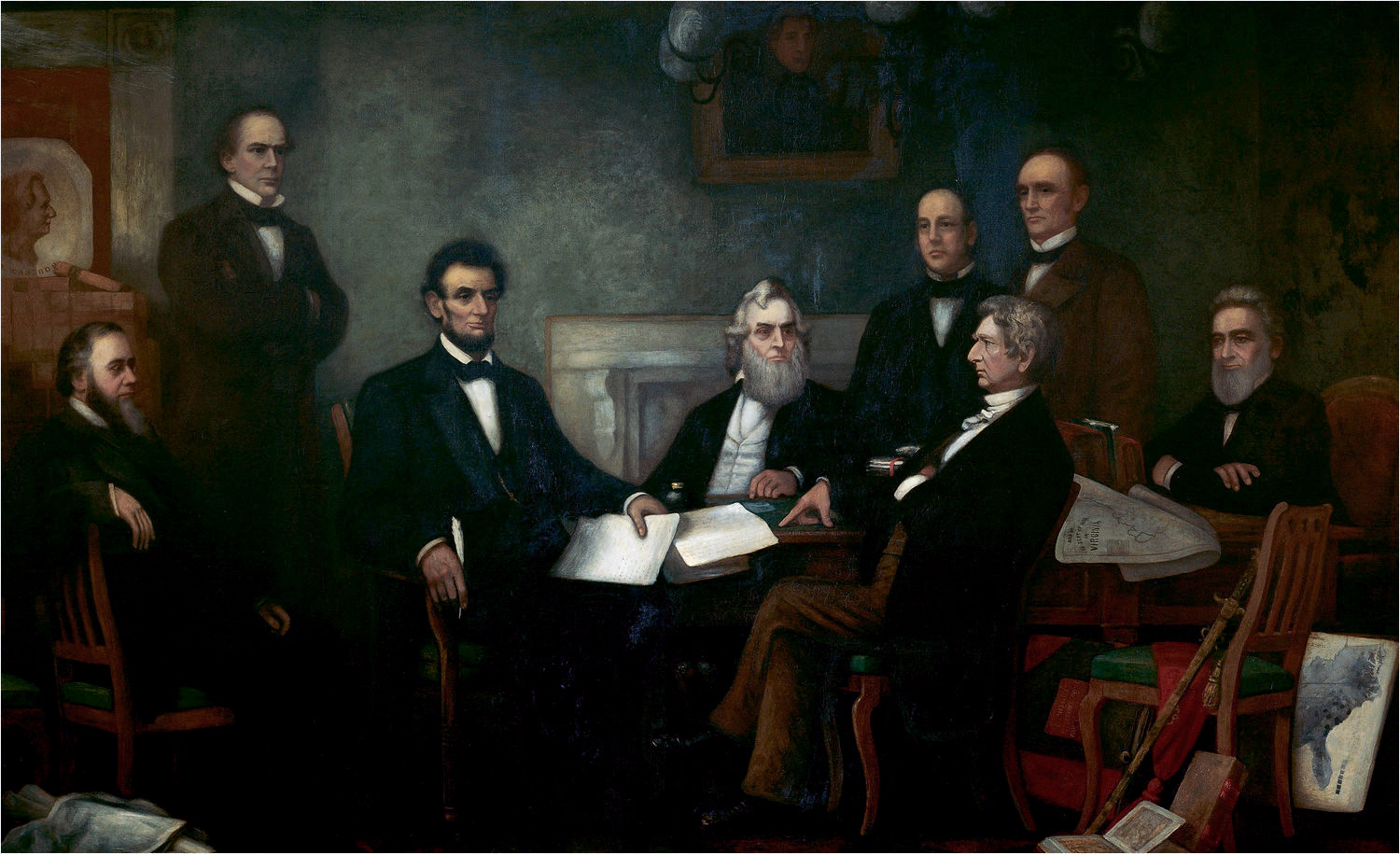
First Reading of the Emancipation Proclamation of President Lincoln. Cameron, no longer a cabinet member, is depicted in a portrait at left.

Even before he resigned as minister to Russia, Cameron was a candidate in the January 1863 United States Senate election in Pennsylvania. Wilmot, the incumbent, was initially the Republican frontrunner for the seat, but was believed to have no chance of overcoming the Democratic one-seat majority in the General Assembly. Cameron's campaign was boosted by Lincoln's issuance of the Emancipation Proclamation, making Cameron appear to have led the way on the issue of freeing and arming the rebels' slaves. Wrote Cameron sarcastically, "well hurrah for Lincoln and the Emancipation Proclamation with the use of Black troops after the War Minister was deposed for the recommendation! Hurrah! Hurrah!"

Despite this, Cameron was unable to gain any Democratic votes in the General Assembly; that party, remembering the events of 1845 and 1857, stationed armed men in the state capitol. Governor Curtin refused to intervene, and no Democrat was willing to chance the consequences of voting for Cameron. Democrat Charles Buckalew was elected with 67 votes to 65 for Cameron and 1 for William D. Kelley. The Pennsylvania House of Representatives issued a report urging the prosecution of Cameron for bribery, but the factions of the Republican Party united against this and no charges were brought.

Immediately, Cameron started to plan for Pennsylvania's next Senate election, in 1867. He began rebuilding his personal political machine, composed of his many friends and supporters from across Pennsylvania, which had fallen into disrepair due to his absence from the state. Curtin's health had deteriorated as governor; Cameron tried to deny him renomination or else sideline him by getting him a diplomatic post, a plan to which Lincoln was agreeable. The plot failed; there was considerable popular support for a second Curtin term, and many Republicans felt only Curtin could win. The governor gained easy renomination and won reelection; Cameron led several election meetings for him.

Cameron continued to mend fences with Lincoln, helping the president with his re-election by getting the Republican members of the legislature to issue a letter to the president urging him to seek a second term—Cameron had done this for Jackson thirty years previously. He also obtained a pro-Lincoln delegation to the 1864 National Union National Convention, which nominated Lincoln, and arranged support for Andrew Johnson, the military governor of Tennessee, whom Lincoln wanted as running mate. Cameron campaigned for Lincoln in the fall, and the re-elected president's gratitude translated into participation in political patronage, which helped Cameron politically by allowing him to reward supporters with federal jobs in a way that Curtin could not.

Lincoln's assassination in 1865 deprived Cameron of patronage, advantaging Curtin, who also wanted the Senate seat, as did the governor's capture of important state party offices. The battle continued through 1866, both candidates working to get supporters nominated for the legislature. The increasing battle over Reconstruction between the Republicans and the new president, Johnson, forced them at times to work together to defeat pro-Johnson candidates. The October 1866 legislative elections gave the Republicans a majority of over thirty in the General Assembly, assuring that the new senator would be a Republican, though who it would be was still uncertain. Both Cameron and Curtin worked to gain the seat, as did others considered likely to be elected only if there was a deadlock, such as Congressman Thaddeus Stevens and former speaker Grow.

After the election, Curtin was seen as the frontrunner, since his supporter, Matthew Quay was expected to be elected speaker of the state house of representatives, who could influence members by offering committee assignments. The other factions combined to defeat Quay, supplanting him with John P. Glass, who to the chagrin of the Stevens and other factions proved to be a secret Cameron supporter. With the momentum clearly moving in Cameron's direction, Curtin met with the minor candidates, hoping to find a way to defeat Cameron, but the only scheme they could come up with was to work with the Democrats, which Curtin refused to consider. Cameron's son and campaign manager, James Donald "Don" Cameron, offered Quay and others amnesty in exchange for their votes; after consulting with Curtin, Quay agreed.

Cameron won a first-ballot victory in the Republican caucus and then defeated the Democratic choice, incumbent senator Edgar Cowan, a Republican who supported Johnson. The victory began the extended reign by Cameron and his successors over Pennsylvania Republican politics. Cameron himself, in a victory speech, saw his election as a vindication of his honesty, called for a protective tariff and for opposition to Johnson, condemning any Republican who accepted a job from him. He called for the South to be ruled by the North for a generation, and for the word "white" to be stricken from the Pennsylvania Constitution.

== Third Senate term ==
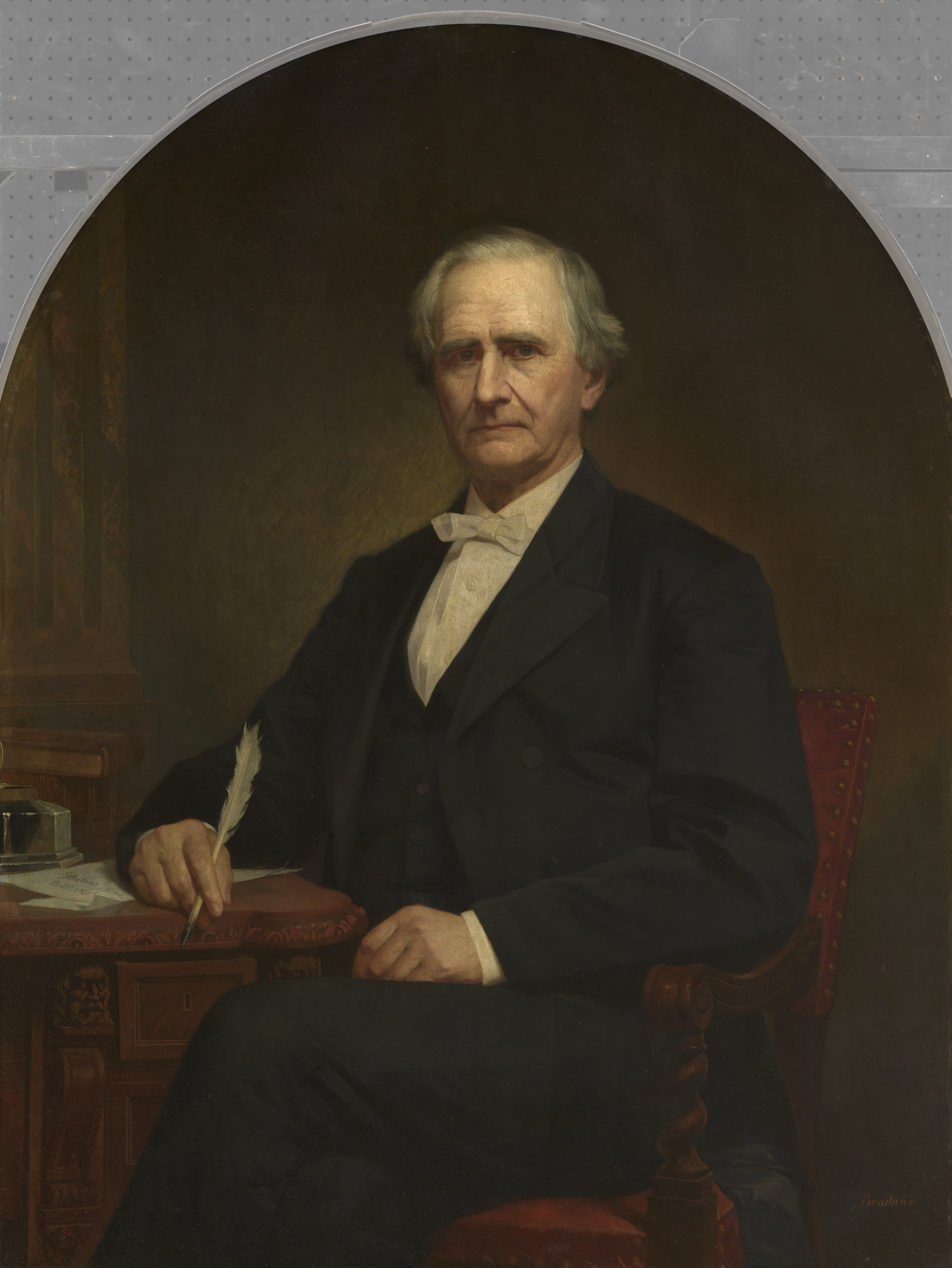
Painting of Cameron by John Dabour (1871)

Cameron was sworn in for a third term in the Senate on March 4, 1867, a session called nine months early by a law designed to ensure that Johnson would not control Reconstruction. Cameron was among those supporting the legislation pressed by the radicals, stating he did not see how the South could expect anything better after they had tried to destroy the Union. When, in 1868, the battle between president and Congress culminated with the impeachment of Andrew Johnson, Cameron was a strong supporter of removing Johnson from office, and was twice ruled out of order by the presiding officer in the trial, his old cabinet colleague, Chase, now chief justice.

The Curtin faction remained a threat; there had been some public dismay at the selection of Cameron over the popular wartime governor. The 1868 state party convention denied Cameron the position of chair of the Pennsylvania delegation to the 1868 Republican National Convention and bound the delegation to support Curtin for vice president; he did not win. Curtin's influence was curtailed when the new president, Republican Ulysses S. Grant, appointed him minister to Russia. Cameron was where ambitious young men in Pennsylvania, such as Matthew Quay, looked to for influence, and Curtin's influence in the mainstream Republican Party was destroyed when he supported the Liberal Republican Party and its presidential candidate, Horace Greeley, in 1872. Quay became increasingly prominent as a Cameron lieutenant; the senator also looked to promote his son Don at every opportunity.

Cameron at first had a rocky relationship with Grant; he could have vetoed the president's appointment of Curtin under senatorial courtesy, but stayed his hand. He did block that of Alexander L. Russell, a Curtinite, to be minister to Ecuador. This irritated Grant, and Secretary of State Hamilton Fish warned him, "there is no use in fighting Cameron", but relations were not healed until a mutual friend engineered a meeting during a presidential visit to Pennsylvania in August 1869. Grant was greatly impressed with Cameron. Thereafter, both Simon and Don Cameron were close to Grant, visiting at the White House and joining him on trips.

Cameron continued to advocate for African Americans. In 1870, he spoke in the debate over whether to seat Hiram Revels, the first black senator; the Democrats argued that Revels, a former slave, had not been a citizen until the ratification of the Fourteenth Amendment in 1868, and did not meet the requirement that senators have been citizens for nine years. The Senate seated Revels, with Cameron voting in favor; after Revels made his maiden speech, Cameron was first to congratulate him.

In 1870, Grant negotiated a treaty for the annexation of Santo Domingo (later known as the Dominican Republic). It was referred to the Foreign Relations Committee, led by Sumner, and unfavorably recommended. Cameron signed the report, but hedged his position and later voted for the treaty on the floor of the Senate, where it failed of ratification. Grant was enraged at Sumner, who had an independent streak, and insisted on his ouster as chair. This took place at the start of the 42nd Congress in March 1871, making Cameron the chair. There was some feeling that Cameron, a diplomat only briefly, was not qualified. As chair, Cameron was heavily involved in the Treaty of Washington, which resolved several differences with the British.

== Fourth term and resignation ==
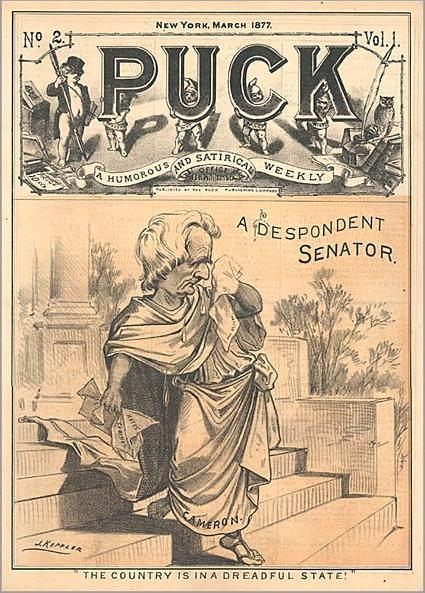
Joseph Keppler satirizes Cameron's departure from the Senate

With the help of Quay and others, the Camerons continued to build a political machine which would endure in the state for decades. This consisted of an alliance between the local Republican organizations, manufacturers and the railroads. Cameron, having outlasted or simply outlived most of those who aided him early in his career, thrived by continuing to attract new adherents, such as Quay, often as loyal to him personally as to the Republican Party.

The 1872 elections were successful for Pennsylvania Republicans, re-electing Grant, electing a Republican governor, John F. Hartranft, and a Republican-majority legislature that was to fill Cameron's seat in the Senate. Quay, soon to be Hartranft's Secretary of the Commonwealth, successfully managed Cameron's re-election bid, turning back a bid by industrialist Charlemagne Tower for the Republican caucus endorsement, and Cameron won easily in the General Assembly. on January 22, 1873, with 76 votes to 50 for William A. Wallace and two scattered. One supporter marked the first time Cameron had won a Senate term without a bitter battle with, "Nothing can beat you. You are invincible." The Harrisburg Patriot called Cameron the "undisputed master in Pennsylvania".

With another six-year term secured, and by then well into his seventies, though in generally good health, Cameron left more and more work to Don Cameron and Quay, devoting time to travel. He began a series of annual visits to New Orleans, though after 1874, he visited without his wife Margaret, as she died that year.

In 1875, Cameron succeeded in getting the House of Representatives to rescind its censure of him from 1862. His major remaining ambition was to get a cabinet post for Don Cameron, that would give him sufficient national stature to allow him to succeed his father in the Senate when Simon was ready to retire. However, relations with Grant had grown strained again, and the president ignored hints from the senator and editorials in pro-Cameron newspapers. It was not until mid-1876 that Grant moved Secretary of War Alphonso Taft to become attorney general and appointed Don Cameron as his replacement.

Simon Cameron did not attend the 1876 Republican National Convention in Cincinnati, but Secretary of War Don Cameron led the Pennsylvania delegation, which was pledged to Governor Hartranft as favorite son, but was open for deals when Hartranft failed to show enough strength. Don Cameron offered Pennsylvania's votes to the manager of Senator James G. Blaine in exchange for a promise to appoint a Pennsylvanian to the cabinet. Blaine refused, and Governor Rutherford B. Hayes of Ohio won the nomination, with Pennsylvania providing the exact margin of victory.

Simon Cameron campaigned for Hayes in the fall campaign, and the election yielded a murky picture, with the difference dependent on disputed southern votes. He opposed the electoral commission that was instituted to decide the election, seeing it as a scheme to elect the Democrat, Samuel J. Tilden. Nevertheless, Hayes was chosen.

As soon as Hayes was inaugurated, the Cameron machine used its resources to persuade him to retain Don Cameron in the cabinet. Hayes refused, saying he had pledged not to retain any of Grant's cabinet members. Simon Cameron reluctantly voted to confirm Hayes's cabinet nominees, though first opposing them in executive session, but felt out of step with Hayes's planned policies, including civil service reform, and it was clear he would have little influence in the Hayes White House. He was the oldest member of the Senate, almost all of his old colleagues having gone.

On March 12, 1877, Cameron's resignation was sent by special messenger to Governor Hartranft. The same night, each Republican member of the legislature was called to the Cameron mansion and asked to sign an endorsement of Don Cameron for Senate. The following day, the Republican caucus, with only one dissent, voted for Don Cameron as Republican nominee, and he was subsequently elected to the Senate by the Republican legislative majority on a party-line vote.

== Retirement and death ==
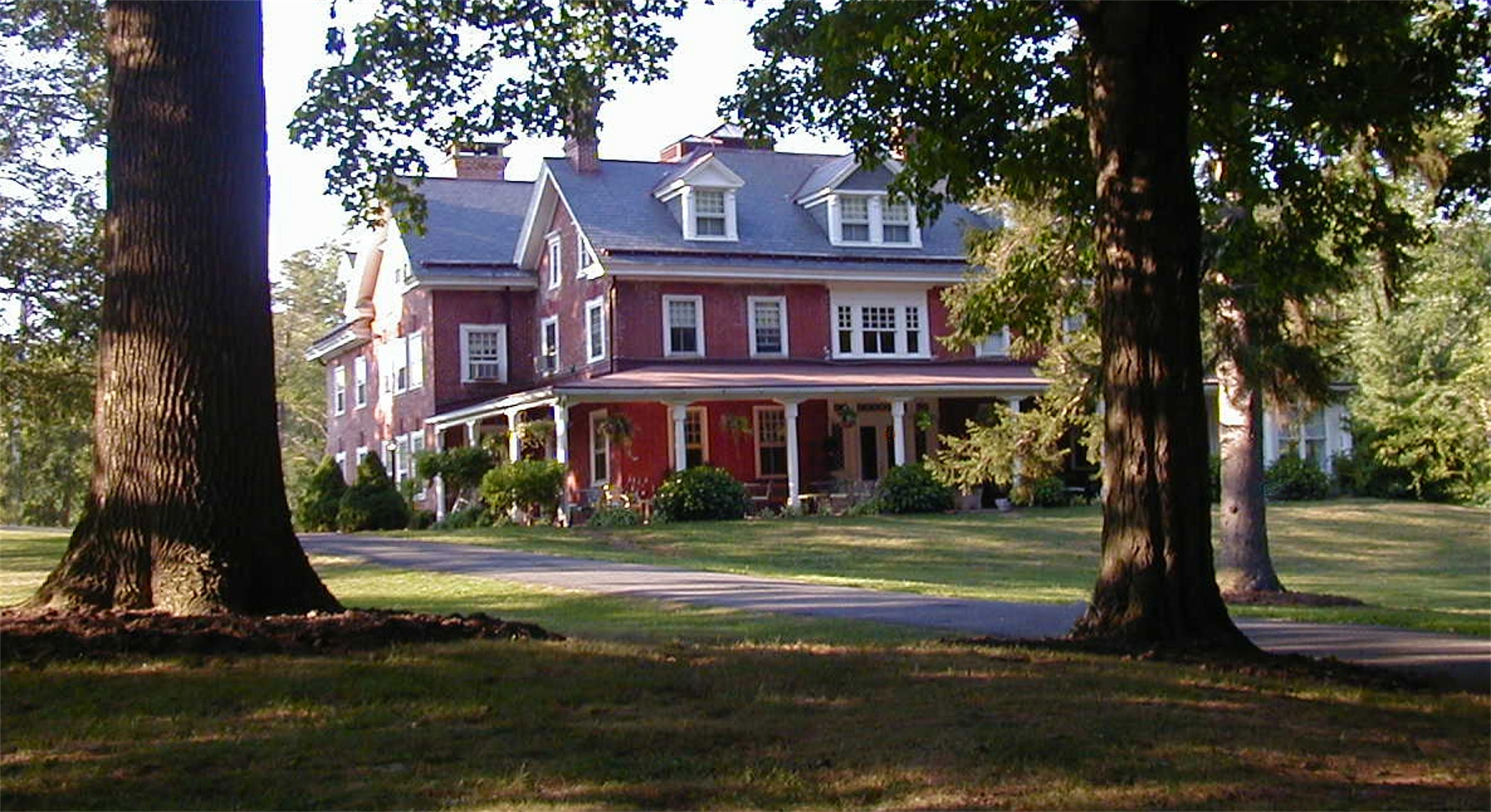
Cameron's estate, now an inn

Control of the Cameron machine passed seamlessly to Don Cameron and Quay, and during the remainder of Simon Cameron's lifetime, he saw his son elected again twice, in 1879 and 1885, and Matthew Quay elected to the Senate in 1887. Having not appointed a Pennsylvanian to a major post, Hayes left the choice of minister to Britain to the state's congressional caucus. When Simon Cameron's name was mentioned, no one was willing to oppose it, but on learning that some considered themselves coerced, Hayes named John Welsh instead.

In February 1877, Cameron was sued for $50,000 by Mary Oliver (known as "the Widow Oliver"), a woman whom he had recommended for a job at the Treasury Department. Oliver alleged she had had an affair with Cameron and he had promised marriage. In September 1878, the case was settled for $1,000 after which Oliver sued again, but the case was dismissed. Nevertheless, the situation was widely covered in the newspapers and caused Cameron embarrassment.

Both Camerons supported Grant in his attempt to gain a third, non-consecutive term in 1880; when Congressman James A. Garfield got the nomination on the 36th ballot, Simon Cameron only briefly campaigned for him, though he visited the new president at the White House in May 1881. Cameron traveled occasionally and spent much of his time on his estates, where he lived with his disabled son Simon and other relatives, spending much of his time reading or passing the time with visitors. He purchased other lands near Maytown that had been worked by his grandfather and great-grandfather, and invested time and money in their success. Already a millionaire at retirement, he increased his wealth by 50 percent during his final years, and regretted that no family member of the younger generations showed business acumen.

At age 88, he embarked on a long-planned voyage to Europe, visiting England, where he was hosted for several days by the Duke of Marlborough at Blenheim Palace, and Scotland, where his host was Andrew Carnegie. He cancelled a planned visit to Paris to spend more time in Scotland, land of his paternal ancestors.

On his ninetieth birthday, March 8, 1889, Pennsylvania's governor and its legislature visited his house in Harrisburg to honor him, and many congratulatory telegrams (including one from Buffalo Bill) were received. The only absentee was Senator Quay, busy in Washington, advising the new president, Benjamin Harrison. The following month, he moved to his country house, but soon fell ill. He recovered, but suffered a stroke on June 20, 1889. He died six days later at Maytown, surrounded by family, though Senator Cameron was absent in Europe.

In the absence of Don Cameron, arrangements were made for the funeral by Simon's grandson, Simon Brua Cameron. The casket was taken by special train to Harrisburg, to a funeral home there, followed by a simple service by a local minister. He was interred at Harrisburg Cemetery beside his wife Margaret.

== Assessment ==
The 1936 Dictionary of American Biography considered that "No politician of his generation understood the science of politics better than Simon Cameron; none enjoyed greater power. He studied and understood individuals who could be of service to him; he knew the precise value of men and could marshal them when occasion arose. His methods were often circuitous, the means employed were often questionable, but the end in view was always clear." Kansas Senator Edmund G. Ross stated that Cameron would "never forgive an injury, real or imagined, and never forget a favor". The Cameron machine dominated politics in Pennsylvania until the 1920s, with control of it passing to his son Don, then to Matthew Quay, and then to Senator Boies Penrose.

To Simon Cameron is attributed the saying, "an honest politician is one who, when he is bought, stays bought." Many historians have so stressed Cameron's corruption as to make it appear the major feature of his political career. Kahan stated that "in reality, Cameron was never the crook his enemies claimed. Surely, Cameron operated in the shadows of the American political system, forging backroom deals and trading quids for quos like the capitalist he was." Lee F. Crippen, who penned a book on Cameron's prewar career, believed him a "victim of misrepresentation. Various phases of his career have been subjected to study with an excessive amount of attention paid to certain of his actions. This has resulted in a distorted view of his career and thrown it out of focus."

According to one widely circulated story, Thaddeus Stevens, asked by Lincoln for his opinion on Cameron's honesty, responded, "I do not believe he would steal a red hot stove". Informed of this by Lincoln, a furious Cameron demanded a retraction. Stevens then stated, "I apologize. I said Cameron would not steal a red hot stove. I withdraw that statement." Bradley deemed the story apocryphal, but serving to illustrate Stevens' character; Kahan felt it illustrated Lincoln's readiness to let Cameron be the butt of a joke, also shown by his willingness to let Cameron be discomfited during the long battle over his appointment. Cameron later deemed Grant a person "of simple honesty— not cunning like ... Lincoln".

Bradley deemed Cameron's appointment as War Secretary a mistake on the part of Lincoln, "No phase of Cameron's career suffered greater criticism than his conduct of the War Department in 1861. Here was a man poorly equipped for a super-human task." Historian T. Harry Williams called Cameron "an inefficient and corrupt administrator"; Allan Nevins believed him unprincipled. Jean H. Baker deemed Cameron a "poor manager. He kept records in his head, was overwhelmed by the hordes of officeseekers, and used personal friendship as the rationale for many appointments." Bradley stated, writing in 1966, "the passing of a century found almost no one willing to do honor to a name repeatedly used for the purpose of symbolizing the worst in political machinations".

Alexander McClure, often his opponent, stated of him, "There is not an important complete chapter of political history in the State that can be written with the omission of his defeats or triumphs, and even after his death until the present time [1905] no important chapter of political history can be fully written without recognizing his successors and assigns in politics as leading or controlling factors." Historian Brooks M. Kelley wrote, "Cameron's reputation has stood in the way of an objective appraisal" of his life. Kahan noted that Cameron's advocacy for African Americans is too often overlooked, pushing Lincoln to allow black soldiers and make slavery's end a war aim. "In short, if there is much to dislike about Cameron, there is also much to admire."

== See also ==
- Cameron County, Pennsylvania
- Cameron Parish, Louisiana
- Simon Cameron House and Bank, Middletown, Pennsylvania
- Simon Cameron House, Harrisburg, Pennsylvania
- Simon Cameron School, Harrisburg, Pennsylvania

== Bibliography ==
- Berman, David R. (2019). Governors and the Progressive Movement. University Press of Colorado. ISBN 978-1-60732-915-2.
- Bradley, Erwin Stanley (1966). Simon Cameron, Lincoln's Secretary of War: A Political Biography. University of Pennsylvania Press. LCCN 65020756.
- Crippen, Lee Forbes (1942). Simon Cameron, Ante-Bellum Years. Mississippi Valley Press. OCLC 195269.
- Evans, Frank Bernard (1962). Pennsylvania Politics 1872–1877: A Study in Leadership Without Responsibility (Thesis). The Pennsylvania State University. ProQuest 287955994.
- Good, Timothy S. (2009). Lincoln for President: an Underdog's Path to the 1860 Republican Nomination (softcover ed.). McFarland & Company, Inc. ISBN 978-0-7864-3957-7.
- Goodwin, Doris Kearns (2005). Team of Rivals: The Political Genius of Abraham Lincoln (Kindle ed.). Simon & Schuster. ISBN 978-0-7432-7075-5.
- Hearn, Chester G. (2010). Lincoln, the Cabinet, and the Generals. Louisiana State University Press. ISBN 978-0807136379.
- Kahan, Paul (2016). Amiable Scoundrel: Simon Cameron, Lincoln's Scandalous Secretary of War. University of Nebraska Press. ISBN 978-1-61234-814-8.
- Kehl, James A. (1981). Boss Rule in the Gilded Age: Matt Quay of Pennsylvania. University of Pittsburgh Press. ISBN 978-0-8229-3426-4.
- Kelley, Brooks M. (October 1963). "Simon Cameron and the Senatorial Nomination of 1867". The Pennsylvania Magazine of History and Biography. 87 (4): 375–392. JSTOR 20089650.
- Schiller, Wendy J.; Stewart, Charles III (2015). Electing the Senate: Indirect Democracy Before the Seventeenth Amendment (eBook ed.). Princeton University Press. ISBN 978-0-691-16316-1.
- Stewart, John D. II (January 1972). "The Great Winnebago Chieftain: Simon Cameron's Rise to Power 1860–1867". Pennsylvania History: A Journal of Mid-Atlantic Studies. 39 (1): 20–39. JSTOR 27771991.

U.S. Senate
Preceded by James Buchanan	U.S. Senator (Class 3) from Pennsylvania; 1845–1849; Served alongside: Daniel Sturgeon	Succeeded by James Cooper
Preceded by William L. Dayton	Chair of the Senate Agriculture Committee; 1845–1846	Succeeded by Jesse D. Bright
Preceded by Richard Brodhead	U.S. Senator (Class 1) from Pennsylvania; 1857–1861; Served alongside: William Bigler, Edgar Cowan	Succeeded by David Wilmot
Preceded by Edgar Cowan	U.S. Senator (Class 3) from Pennsylvania; 1867–1877; Served alongside: Charles R. Buckalew, John Scott, William A. Wallace	Succeeded by J. Donald Cameron
Preceded by John Sherman	Chair of the Senate Public Buildings Committee; 1867–1871	Succeeded by Oliver P. Morton
Preceded by Charles Sumner	Chair of the Senate Foreign Relations Committee; 1871–1877	Succeeded by Hannibal Hamlin
Political offices
Preceded by Joseph Holt	United States Secretary of War; 1861–1862	Succeeded by Edwin Stanton
Diplomatic posts
Preceded by Cassius Marcellus Clay	United States Minister to Russia; 1862–1863	Succeeded by Cassius Marcellus Clay
Honorary titles
Preceded by Joseph Cilley	Oldest living U.S. senator 1887–1889	Succeeded by David Meriwether
Preceded by Henry A. Foster	Most senior living U.S. senator Sitting or former 1889	Succeeded by Alpheus Felch; James W. Bradbury
