= John Newcomer (Maryland politician) =

American politician (1797–1861)

Member of the Maryland Senate from the Washington County district
- In office 1840–1846
- Preceded by: Robert Wason
- Succeeded by: William B. Clarke

Personal details
- Born: December 18, 1797
- Died: April 21, 1861 (aged 63)
- Spouse: Catherine Newcomer
- Children: Benjamin Franklin Newcomer
- Occupation: Politician; farmer

John Newcomer (December 18, 1797 – April 21, 1861) was an American politician and farmer from Maryland. He served as a member of the Maryland Senate, representing Washington County, from 1840 to 1846.

== Early life ==
John Newcomer was born on December 18, 1797, to Henry Newcomer.

== Career ==
Newcomer was a large real estate holder in Washington County, Maryland. He worked his farm and operated a mill in Beaver Creek. He founded Newcomer & Stonebraker, a flour and grain commission firm in Baltimore.

Newcomer served as sheriff of Washington County from 1836 to 1839. He served as a member of the Maryland Senate, representing Washington County, from 1840 to 1846. He served as county commissioner of Washington County in 1846 and 1859. He was a delegate to the convention that framed the Maryland Constitution of 1850.

== Personal life ==
Newcomer married his cousin Catherine Newcomer, daughter of Samuel Newcomer. Their son was Benjamin Franklin Newcomer.

Newcomer died on April 21, 1861.
