= Robert Wason (Maryland politician) =

American politician and lawyer

Member of the Maryland Senate from the Washington County district
- In office 1838–1840
- Preceded by: Office established
- Succeeded by: John Newcomer

Personal details
- Resting place: Hancock, Maryland, U.S.
- Party: Democratic
- Occupation: Politician; lawyer

Robert Wason was an American politician and lawyer from Maryland. He served as a member of the Maryland Senate, representing Washington County, from 1838 to 1840.

== Career ==
Wason was elected in 1838 to the Maryland Senate, defeating Andrew Kershner. He served as a member of the Maryland Senate, representing Washington County, from 1838 to 1840.

Wason was appointed by Governor Francis Thomas as register of wills of Washington County in September 1843. He served in that role until he resigned in November 1843.

Wason was a Democrat. He served as a presidential elector in the 1836 United States presidential election. He served as a delegate from Maryland's second district to the 1848 Democratic National Convention.

Wason practiced law with George Freaner and George W. Smith.

== Personal life ==
Wason worked to establish the Presbyterian Church in Hancock, Maryland. A large monument is in front of the church marking the grave of Wason.
