= Robert Alexander Wason =

American novelist

- Born: April 6, 1874; Toledo, Ohio
- Died: May 11, 1955 (aged 81); Mountain Lakes, New Jersey

Robert Alexander Wason (April 6, 1874 – May 11, 1955) was an American writer. He was known for writing novels predominantly on a western theme, and short stories, some of them serials.

Wason was born in Toledo, Ohio to Robert Alexander Wason, a merchant, and Gertrude Louise Paddock. He went to High School in Delphi, Indiana and then clerked for his father for eight years, punctuated by episodes of tramping and camping in the west. Wason served in the U. S. Army (artillery) for nine months during the Spanish–American War (1898–99), and worked in a wide variety of jobs and places before settling down to a career writing, with his westerns incorporating items from his life's experiences. In addition to clerking for his father, he worked as an office boy, a grip man on the San Francisco cable car system, a miner in a Nevada mercury mine, and as a farmer in Delphi, Indiana. Over his life he lived in Ohio, Indiana, San Francisco, Detroit, Orr's Island, Maine, Temple, Arizona, Arden, Delaware, Norwalk, Connecticut, and Mountain Lakes, New Jersey. Wason married Emma Louise Brownell in Peru, Indiana in 1911. They had two sons and a daughter. He died in Mountain Lakes, New Jersey.

== Works ==
- Babe Randolph's Turning Point (1904)
- The Wolves (1908)
- Nachette (1909) (with Ned Nye)
- Happy Hawkins (1909)
- The Steering Wheel (1910)
- The Knight Errant (1911)
- The Dog and the Child and the Ancient Sailor Man (1911)
- Friar Tuck (1912)
- And Then Came Jean (1913)
- Happy Hawkins in the Panhandle (1914)
- Correspondence with H. L. Mencken (1916)
- Happy Hawkins again (1925)
