= Nebraska Legislature 35th district =

American legislative district

Nebraska's 35th legislative district
- Map of Nebraska Legislature districts with the 35th district shaded in red
Senator
Dan Quick; D–Grand Island
since 2025
- Demographics: 59% White; 4.1% Black; 42% Hispanic; 1.1% Asian; 1.9% Native American
- Population (2020): 38,312

The Nebraska Legislature's 35th district is one of the 49 legislative districts in the Nebraska Legislature. The district is located in south-central Nebraska and covers part of Hall County. It encompasses the core of Grand Island and also includes some of its outlying areas. Dan Quick has represented the district since 2025.

== Demographics ==
The US Census Bureau recorded the population as of 2020 at 38,312.

- 59% of the district is White.
- 42% of the district is Hispanic.
- 4.1% of the district is Black.
- 1.9% of the district is Native American.
- 1.1% of the district is Asian.

== List of representatives ==
Representative	Party	Years of service	Legislature	Residence
Dan Quick	Democratic	2025 - present	109th	Grand Island
Ray Aguilar	Republican	2021-2025	107th-108th	Grand Island
Dan Quick	Democratic	2017-2021	105th-106th	Grand Island
Mike Gloor	Republican	2009-2017	101st-104th	Grand Island
Ray Aguilar	Republican	1999-2009	96th-100th	Grand Island
Chris Peterson	Republican	1997-1999*	95th-96th	Grand Island
Dan Fisher	Republican	1993-1997	93rd-94th	Grand Island
Arlene Nelson	Democratic	1985-1993	89th-92nd	Grand Island
Howard Peterson	Republican	1981-1985	87th-88th	Grand Island
Ralph Kelly	Republican	1973-1981	83rd-86th	Grand Island
Don Elrod	Republican	1966-1973	76th-82nd	Grand Island
Ira Paine	Republican	1965-1966*	75th-76th	Grand Island

- Chris Peterson resigned before his term ended. Ray Aguilar was appointed to fill the vacancy.
- Ira Paine died during his term. Don Elrod was appointed to fill the vacancy.
