= Senator Peterson =

Senator Peterson may refer to:

- Bob Peterson (Ohio politician) (born 1962), Ohio State Senate
- Carl H. Peterson (1895–1979), Nebraska State Senate
- Cary Peterson (born 1935), Utah State Senate
- Chris Peterson (Nebraska politician) (born 1950), Nebraska State Senate
- Collin Peterson (born 1944), Minnesota State Senate
- Darin Peterson (born 1966), Utah State Senate
- Darrel Peterson (1939–1994), Minnesota State Senate
- Dutton Peterson (1894–1964), New York State Senate
- Elmer Peterson (1892–1978), Wisconsin State Senate
- Harper Peterson (born 1948), North Carolina State Senate
- Herbert Peterson (1876–1952), Wisconsin State Senate
- Howard Peterson (1914–2003), Nebraska State Senate
- Hugh Peterson (1898–1961), Georgia State Senate
- Jim Peterson (Montana politician) (born 1946), Montana State Senate
- Jim Peterson (South Dakota politician) (born 1943), South Dakota Senate
- John Peterson (Pennsylvania politician) (born 1938), Pennsylvania State Senate
- John B. Peterson (Nebraska politician) (1899–1974), Nebraska State Senate
- Joseph R. Peterson (1904–1967), Illinois State Senate
- Karen Carter Peterson (born 1969), Louisiana State Senate
- Karen E. Peterson, Delaware State Senate
- Lowell Peterson (1921–1989), Washington State Senate
- Richard Peterson (Nebraska politician) (1928–2020), Nebraska State Senate
- R. Ray Peterson (born 1959), Wyoming State Senate
- William E. Peterson (1936–2026), Illinois State Senate

== See also ==
- Senator Pederson (disambiguation)
- Senator Petersen (disambiguation)
