= 1988 California elections =

1988 California elections could refer to:

- 1988 United States presidential election in California
- 1988 United States Senate election in California
- 1988 California State Senate election
