= Dulcelina Salce Curtis =

Dulcelina Salce Curtis (17 July 1904- 16 April 1995) was an orchardist, farmer, conservationist, and teacher from Corrales, New Mexico.

== Life ==
Dulcelina "Dulce" was born in 1904 in Corrales, New Mexico. After her mother, a mail order bride from Italy, died in the 1918 Influenza epidemic, Dulce had to leave school in order to take care of her younger siblings. She was determined to graduate nevertheless, and did so from New Mexico Normal College in 1925 with a teaching licensure. She was married to Vincent in 1928 and lived with her husband and children on an apple orchard, leading to her nickname as the "apple lady." Dulce and her husband were active members of civic life in their community, and together founded the Corrales Watershed Board, the New Mexico Fruit Growers Association, and the Corrales Community Library. Dulce also founded the Corrales P.T.A., the community 4-H club, and helped Corrales become incorporated in 1971. She was the first woman appointed to a board of the U.S. Agricultural Stabilization and Conservation District. In 1988, she received the National Endowment for Soil Conservation award for New Mexico. In 1991, a flood control channel was named after her in honor of her work with water conservation and controlling floods, and that same year she was added to the New Mexico Democrat's Hall of Fame.
