= Senator Aguilar =

Senator Aguilar may refer to:

- Irene Aguilar (born 1960), Colorado State Senate
- Ray Aguilar (born 1947), Nebraska State Senate
