= Carol Boyd Hallett =

American politician

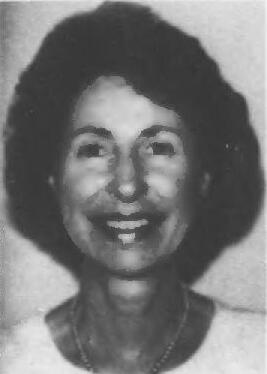

14th Commissioner of the United States Customs Service
- In office November 3, 1989 – January 18, 1993
- President: George H. W. Bush
- Preceded by: William von Raab
- Succeeded by: George J. Weise

6th United States Ambassador to the Bahamas
- In office November 17, 1986 – May 10, 1989
- President: Ronald Reagan; George H. W. Bush
- Preceded by: Lev Dobriansky
- Succeeded by: Chic Hecht

Minority Leader of the California Assembly
- In office December 4, 1978 – November 30, 1981
- Preceded by: Paul V. Priolo
- Succeeded by: Robert W. Naylor

Member of the California State Assembly from the 29th district
- In office December 6, 1976 – November 30, 1982
- Preceded by: Bob Nimmo
- Succeeded by: Eric Seastrand

Personal details
- Born: October 16, 1937 (age 89) Oakland, California
- Party: Republican
- Spouse: James T. Hallett (m. 1958)
- Occupation: Politician, business executive

Carol Boyd Hallett (née Boyd; born October 16, 1937) is an American executive, former politician, and government official. Hallett attended the University of Oregon, where she was initiated as a member of Delta Delta Delta. A Republican, she served in the California State Assembly from the 29th district from 1976 to 1982 and served as the assembly's minority leader from 1978 to 1981. She was the Republican nominee for lieutenant governor in 1982 but was defeated by Democratic candidate Leo T. McCarthy.

Hallett also served as the United States Ambassador to the Bahamas from 1986 to 1989 and as the Commissioner of the United States Customs Service from 1989 to 1993. In 1995 she was named the first female President and CEO of the Air Transport Association, now known as Airlines for America. In 2003 she became counsel to the U.S. Chamber of Commerce. Hallett is a pilot herself, with at least 5,000 flight hours logged as of 2022.

In 2009, the U.S. Chamber of Commerce created the Carol B. Hallett Award to honor those who have has provided significant contributions to the aerospace industry.

== Awards and honors ==
- 2003 McDonald Distinguished Statesman & Stateswoman of Aviation Award
- 2023 Donald D. Engen Aero Club Trophy for Aviation Excellence
- Carol B. Hallett Award named for her by the U.S. Chamber of Commerce
