= United States Customs Service =

Federal government agency from 1789 to 2003

Agency overview
- Formed: July 31, 1789; 237 years ago (1 Stat. 29)
- Dissolved: March 1, 2003
- Superseding agencies: U.S. Customs and Border Protection; U.S. Immigration and Customs Enforcement
- Jurisdiction: Federal government of the United States
- Headquarters: Washington, D.C., U.S.
- Parent agency: United States Department of the Treasury
- Website: U.S. Customs Service at the Wayback Machine (archived March 2, 2000)

The United States Customs Service was a federal law enforcement agency of the U.S. federal government. Established on July 31, 1789, it collected import tariffs, performed other selected border security duties, as well as conducted criminal investigations.

In March 2003, as a result of the homeland security reorganization, the U.S. Customs Service was renamed the "Bureau of Customs and Border Protection", and most of its components were merged with the border elements of the U.S. Immigration and Naturalization Service (INS), including the entire U.S. Border Patrol and former INS inspectors, together with border agriculture inspectors, to form U.S. Customs and Border Protection, a single, unified border agency for the U.S. The investigative office of U.S. Customs was split off and merged with the INS investigative office and the INS interior detention and removal office to form U.S. Immigration and Customs Enforcement, which, among other things, is responsible for interior immigration enforcement. The U.S. Customs Service had three major missions: collecting tariff revenue, protecting the U.S. economy from smuggling and illegal goods, and processing people and goods at ports of entry.

== History ==
Responding to the urgent need for revenue following the American Revolutionary War, the First United States Congress passed and President George Washington signed the Tariff Act of July 4, 1789, which authorized the collection of duties on imported goods. Four weeks later, on July 31, the fifth act of Congress established the United States Customs Service and its ports of entry.

As part of this new government agency, a new role was created for government officials which was known as "Customs Collector". In this role, one person would have responsibility to supervise the collection of custom duties in a particular city or region, such as the Collector of the Port of New York.

For over 100 years after it was founded, the U.S. Customs Service was the primary source of funds for the entire government, paying for the country's early growth and infrastructure. Purchases include the Louisiana and Oregon territories; Florida and Alaska; funding the National Road and the Transcontinental Railroad; building many of the nation's lighthouses; the U.S. Military and Naval academies, and Washington, D.C.

The U.S. Customs Service employed a number of federal law enforcement officers throughout the 19th and 20th centuries. Customs Special Agents investigated smuggling and other violations of customs, narcotics and revenue laws. Customs Inspectors were uniformed officers at airports, seaports and land border ports of entry who inspected people and vehicles entering the U.S. for contraband and dutiable merchandise. Customs Patrol Officers conducted uniformed and plainclothes patrol of the borders on land, sea and air to deter smuggling and apprehend smugglers.

In the 20th century, as international trade and travel increased dramatically, the Customs Service transitioned from an administrative bureau to a federal law enforcement agency. Inspectors still inspected goods and took customs declarations from travelers at ports of entry, but Customs Special Agents used modern police methods—often in concert with allied agencies, such as the Federal Bureau of Investigation, U.S. Postal Inspection Service, U.S. Immigration and Naturalization Service and U.S. Border Patrol—to investigate cases often far from international airports, bridges and land crossings. The original World Trade Center complex, Building 6, housed offices of the U.S. Customs Service.

With the passage of the Homeland Security Act, the U.S. Customs Service passed from under the jurisdiction of the Treasury Department to under the jurisdiction of the Department of Homeland Security.

On March 1, 2003, parts of the U.S. Customs Service combined with the Inspections Program of the Immigration and Naturalization Service, Plant Protection and Quarantine of the USDA and the Border Patrol of the Immigration and Naturalization Service to form U.S. Customs and Border Protection. The Federal Protective Service, along with the investigative arms of the U.S. Customs Service and the Immigration and Naturalization Service, combined to form U.S. Immigration and Customs Enforcement.

== Flag ==
Flag of the United States Customs Service, now the CBP Ensign

The flag of the Customs Service was designed in 1799 by Secretary of the Treasury Oliver Wolcott Jr. and consists of 16 vertical red and white stripes with a coat of arms depicted in blue on the white canton. The original design had the Customs Service seal that was an eagle with three arrows in his left talon, an olive branch in his right and surrounded by an arc of 13 stars. In 1951, this was changed to the eagle depicted on the Great Seal of the United States.

Its actual name is the Revenue Ensign, as it was flown by ships of the Revenue Cutter Service, later the Coast Guard, and at customs houses.

In 1910, President William Howard Taft issued an order to add an emblem to the flag flown by ships from the one flown on land at customs houses. The version with the badge continues to be flown by Coast Guard vessels. Until 2003, the land version was flown at all United States ports of entry. The renamed CBP Ensign is currently flown at CBP's headquarters in Washington, D.C., at its Field Offices, overseas duty locations including preclearance ports, and at all land, air, and sea ports of entry.

A modified version of the flag, with the seal replaced by the star pattern from the national flag (albeit in blue), is often circulated by sovereign citizens as a "peacetime flag".

== Commissioners ==
Beginning in 1927, the Customs Service was headed by an appointed commissioner. Prior to 1927, customs collection was overseen by the director of the Treasury Department's customs division. Commissioners of Customs included:

Commissioner	Term	Administration
Ernest W. Camp	1927–1929	Coolidge
Francis Xavier A. Eble	1929–1933	Hoover
James Moyle	1933–1939	Roosevelt
Basil Harris	1939–1940	Roosevelt
William Roy Johnson	1940–1947	Roosevelt, Truman
Frank Dow (acting)	1947–1949	Truman
Frank Dow	1949–1953	Truman
Ralph Kelly	1954–1961	Eisenhower
Philip Nichols Jr.	1961–1964	Kennedy, Johnson
Lester D. Johnson	1965–1969	Johnson
Myles Ambrose	1969–1972	Nixon
Vernon D. Acree	1972–1977	Nixon, Ford
Robert E. Chasen	1977 – December 1980	Carter
William T. Archey (acting)	December 1980 – October 1981	Reagan
William von Raab	October 1981 – July 31, 1989	Reagan, G. H. W. Bush
Michael H. Lane (acting)	August 1, 1989 – November 2, 1989	G. H. W. Bush
Carol Boyd Hallett	November 3, 1989 – January 18, 1993	G. H. W. Bush
Michael H. Lane (acting)	January 19, 1993 – May 12, 1993	G. H. W. Bush, Clinton
George J. Weise	May 13, 1993 – April 18, 1997	Clinton
Samuel H. Banks (acting)	April 19, 1997 – July 30, 1998	Clinton
Raymond Kelly	July 31, 1998 – January 19, 2001	Clinton
Charles W. Winwood (acting)	January 20, 2001 – September 9, 2001	G. W. Bush
Robert C. Bonner	September 10, 2001 – March 1, 2003	G. W. Bush

== See also ==
- Computer Assisted Passenger Prescreening System
- Immigration and Customs Enforcement (ICE)
- U.S. Customs and Border Protection (CBP)
