= Senator Pederson =

Senator Pederson may refer to:

- Dwite Pedersen (born 1941), Nebraska State Senate
- Jamie Pedersen (born 1968), Washington State Senate
- Don Pederson (1928–2019), Nebraska State Senate
- John Pederson (Minnesota politician) (born 1968), Minnesota State Senate
- Roland Pederson (born 1950), Oklahoma State Senate

== See also ==
- Senator Petersen (disambiguation)
- Senator Peterson (disambiguation)
