= 1982 California lieutenant gubernatorial election =

- November 2, 1982
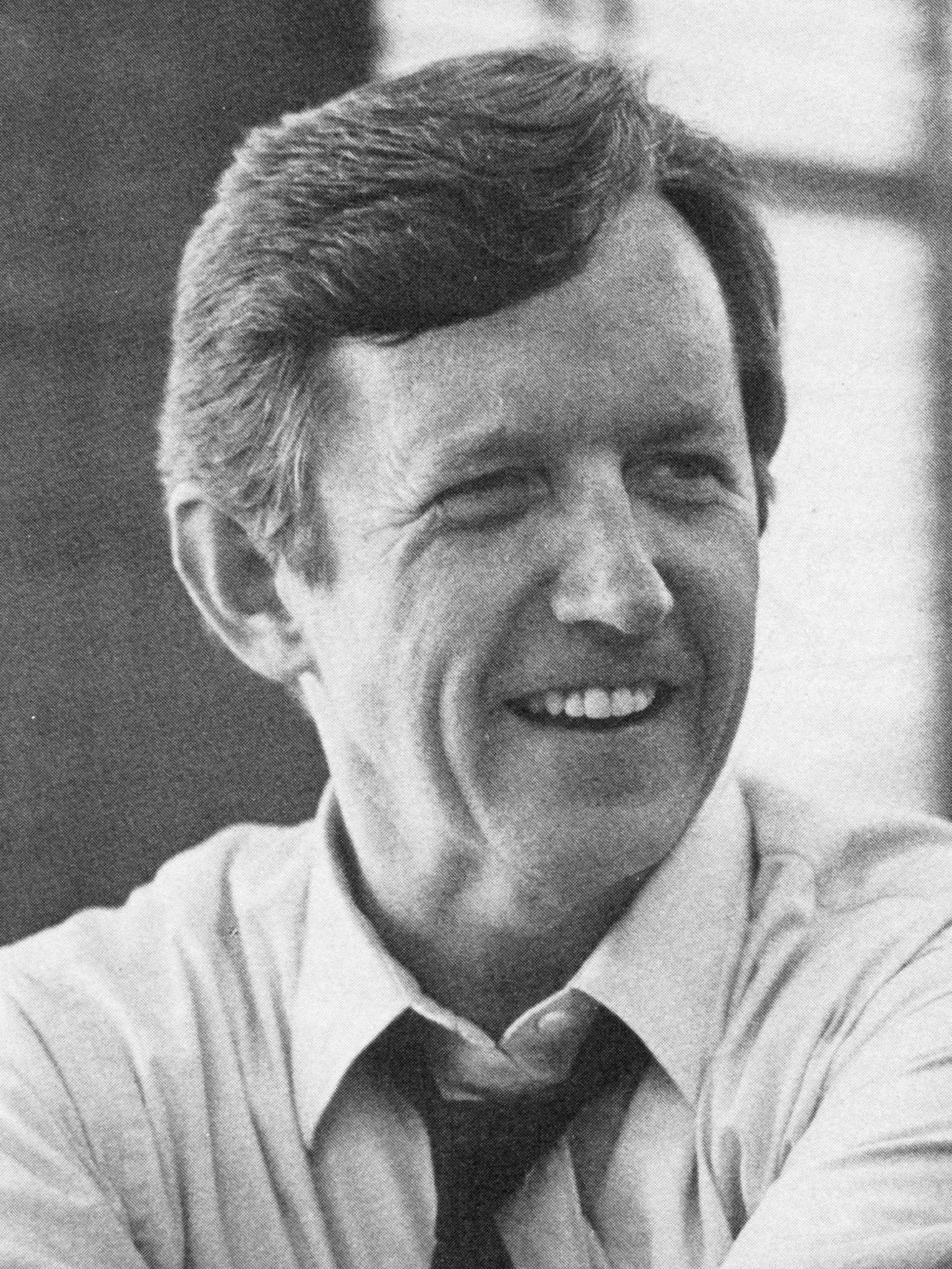

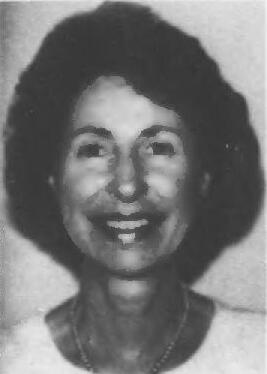
Nominee	Leo T. McCarthy	Carol Boyd Hallett
Party	Democratic	Republican
Popular vote	4,001,839	3,381,861
Percentage	52.21%	44.12%
- County results McCarthy: 40–50% 50–60% 60–70% 70–80% Hallett: 40–50% 50–60% 60–70%
Lieutenant Governor before election
Mike Curb
Republican
Elected Lieutenant Governor
Leo T. McCarthy
Democratic

The 1982 California lieutenant gubernatorial election was held on November 2, 1982. Incumbent Lieutenant Governor Mike Curb decided to run for Governor of California instead of running for a second term. Democratic nominee Leo T. McCarthy defeated Republican nominee Carol Boyd Hallett with 52.21% of the vote.

== Primary elections ==
Primary elections were held on June 8, 1982.

=== Democratic primary ===
==== Candidates ====
- Leo T. McCarthy, State Assemblyman
- Charles "Chuck" Pineda Jr.

==== Results ====
Democratic primary results
Party	Candidate	Votes	%
Democratic	Leo T. McCarthy	1,893,631	74.45
Democratic	Charles "Chuck" Pineda Jr.	248,394	9.77
Democratic	Bill Watkins	223,178	8.77
Democratic	Robert Lee "Bob" Smith	178,478	7.02
Total votes		2,543,681	100.00

=== Republican primary ===
==== Candidates ====
- Carol Boyd Hallett, State Assemblywoman
- Marz J. Garcia, State Senator

==== Results ====
Republican primary results
Party	Candidate	Votes	%
Republican	Carol Boyd Hallett	1,564,205	75.03
Republican	Marz J. Garcia	520,474	24.97
Total votes		2,084,679	100.00

== General election ==
=== Candidates ===
Major party candidates

- Leo T. McCarthy, Democratic
- Carol Boyd Hallett, Republican

Other candidates

- John Vernon, Libertarian
- Clyde Kuhn, Peace and Freedom
- Houston Myers, American Independent

=== Results ===
1982 California lieutenant gubernatorial election
Party	Candidate	Votes	%	±%
Democratic	Leo T. McCarthy	4,001,839	52.21%	+8.93%
Republican	Carol Boyd Hallett	3,381,861	44.12%	−7.52%
Libertarian	John Vernon	108,775	1.42%	+1.42%
Peace and Freedom	Clyde Kuhn	92,304	1.20%	−1.20%
American Independent	Houston Myers	79,697	1.04%	−1.63%
Majority		619,978		
Turnout				
Democratic gain from Republican		Swing		
