= Pete Wilson =

American politician (born 1933)

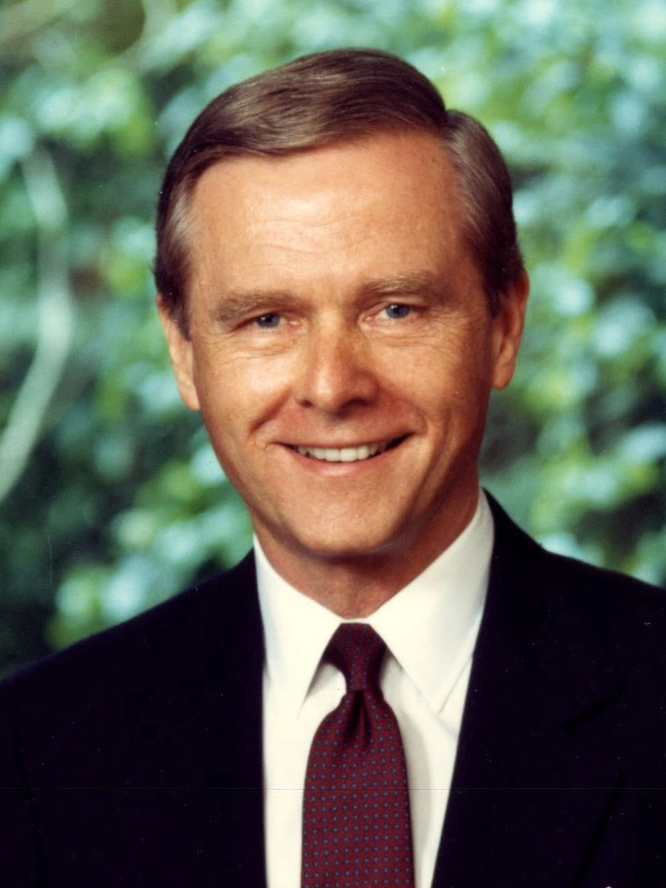
- Official portrait, 1991

36th Governor of California
- In office January 7, 1991 – January 4, 1999
- Lieutenant: Leo T. McCarthy; Gray Davis
- Preceded by: George Deukmejian
- Succeeded by: Gray Davis

United States Senator from California
- In office January 3, 1983 – January 7, 1991
- Preceded by: S. I. Hayakawa
- Succeeded by: John Seymour

29th Mayor of San Diego
- In office December 6, 1971 – January 3, 1983
- Preceded by: Frank Curran
- Succeeded by: Bill Cleator (acting)

Member of the California State Assembly from the 76th district
- In office January 2, 1967 – December 5, 1971
- Preceded by: Clair Burgener
- Succeeded by: Bob Wilson

Personal details
- Born: Peter Barton Wilson; August 23, 1933 (age 93) Lake Forest, Illinois, U.S.
- Party: Republican
- Spouses: Betty Robertson (m. 1968; div. 1981); Gayle Edlund (m. 1983)
- Children: 2
- Education: Yale University (BA); University of California, Berkeley (JD)

Military service
- Branch: United States Marine Corps
- Service years: 1955–1958
- Rank: First Lieutenant
- Unit: 1st Marine Division

Peter Barton Wilson (born August 23, 1933) is an American attorney and politician who served as the 36th governor of California from 1991 to 1999. A member of the Republican Party, Wilson previously served as a United States senator from California from 1983 to 1991, and as mayor of San Diego from 1971 to 1983.

Born in Lake Forest, Illinois, Wilson graduated from the UC Berkeley School of Law after serving in the United States Marine Corps. He established a legal practice in San Diego and campaigned for Republicans such as Richard Nixon and Barry Goldwater. Wilson won election to the California State Assembly in 1966 and became the mayor of San Diego in 1971. He held that office until 1983, when he became a member of the United States Senate. In 1982, he defeated then-incumbent Governor Jerry Brown to become the United States senator from California. In the Senate, Wilson supported the Strategic Defense Initiative and the Civil Liberties Act of 1988, while he opposed the Omnibus Budget Reconciliation Act of 1990.

Wilson resigned from the Senate after winning the 1990 California gubernatorial election. As governor, Wilson signed a three-strikes law and supported energy deregulation and term limits. He was also an advocate for California Proposition 187, which established a state-run citizenship screening system with the intention of preventing illegal immigrants from using social services; this was said to have contributed to the decline of the Republican Party's power in California. Wilson won reelection in the 1994 gubernatorial election. He sought the Republican nomination in the 1996 United States presidential election but dropped out of the race before the primaries began.

Wilson retired from public office after serving two terms as governor. Since leaving office, he has worked for several businesses and has been affiliated with several other organizations. He is a distinguished visiting fellow at the Hoover Institution. As of 2026, Wilson's 1988 re-election is the last time a Republican has won a U.S. Senate race in California.

== Early life ==
Peter Barton Wilson was born on August 23, 1933, in Lake Forest, Illinois, a suburb north of Chicago, at the height of the Great Depression. His parents were James Boone Wilson and Margaret (Callaghan) Wilson. His father sold college fraternity jewelry to work his way through University of Illinois, and later became a successful advertising executive. The Wilson family settled in St. Louis, Missouri, when Pete was in elementary school. He then attended the private, non-sectarian preparatory middle school John Burroughs (grades 7–9) in Ladue, and then St. Louis Country Day School, an exclusive private high school, where he won an award in his senior year for combined scholarship, athletics, and citizenship. In the fall of 1951, Pete Wilson enrolled at Yale University in New Haven, Connecticut, where he received a United States Navy Reserve Officers' Training Corps (ROTC) scholarship, majored in English, and earned his Bachelor of Arts degree. In his junior year he elected to join the Marine Corps upon his graduation.

After graduating from Yale, Wilson served for three years in the United States Marine Corps as an infantry officer, eventually becoming a platoon commander. Upon completion of his Marine Corps service, Wilson earned a Juris Doctor degree from the University of California, Berkeley School of Law in June 1962.

In 1962, while working as an Advance Man for the Republican gubernatorial candidate Richard M. Nixon, Wilson got to know Herb Klein, one of Nixon's top aides. Klein suggested that Wilson might do well in Southern California politics, so in 1963, Wilson moved to San Diego.

After passing the bar exam on his fourth attempt, Wilson began his practice as a criminal defense attorney in San Diego, but he found such work to be low-paying and personally repugnant. He later commented to the Los Angeles Times, "I realized I couldn't be a criminal defense lawyer – because most of the people who do come to you are guilty." Wilson switched to a more conventional law practice and continued his activity in local politics, working for Barry Goldwater's unsuccessful presidential campaign in 1964. Wilson's liking for politics and managing the day-to-day details of the political process was growing. He put in long hours for the Goldwater campaign, earning the friendship of local Republican boosters so necessary for a political career, and in 1966, at the age of thirty-three, he ran for, and won a seat in the California State Assembly, succeeding Clair Burgener.

Wilson was re-elected to the Assembly in 1968 and 1970, and in 1971 was elected mayor of San Diego.

== Mayor of San Diego ==
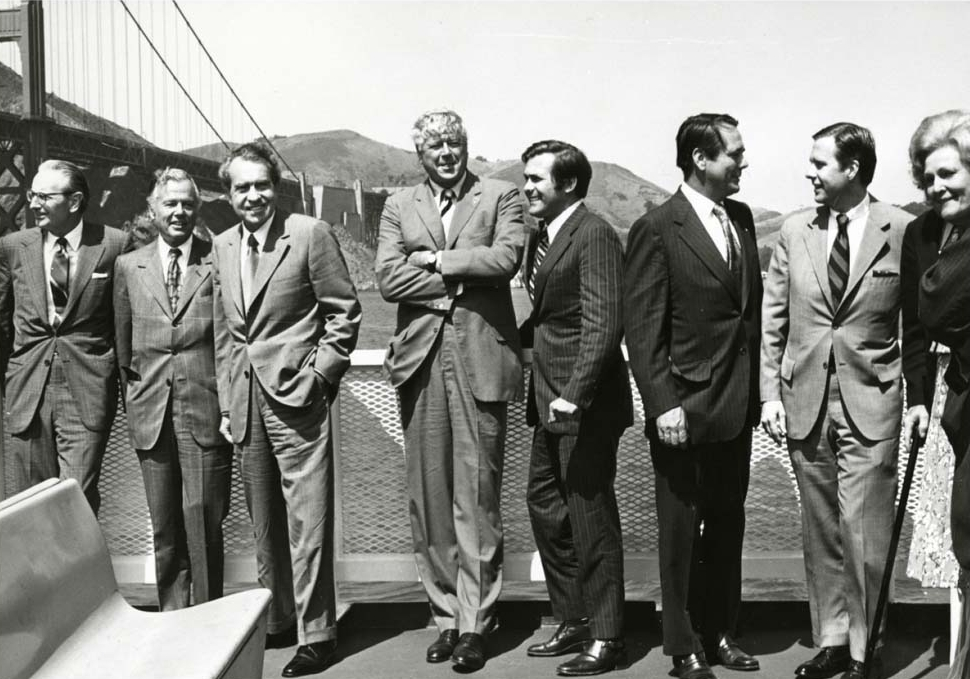
Mayor Wilson (second from right) with U.S. President Richard Nixon, First Lady Pat Nixon, and Nixon's cabinet in front of the Golden Gate Bridge, 1972

Wilson served three terms as mayor of San Diego, from 1971 to 1983, winning election by a 2:1 margin each time. During his three terms he restructured the San Diego City Council, reorganized the planning and civil service commissions, instituted campaign finance reform, and promoted the redevelopment of downtown San Diego. He also helped to keep Major League Baseball's San Diego Padres in the city, helping to persuade local millionaire Ray Kroc to buy the team.

The 1972 Republican National Convention had been scheduled to take place in San Diego in August 1972. However, in May 1972 the Republican National Committee voted to move the convention to Miami Beach because of a scandal involving a donation to the event by ITT Corporation, as well as concerns about the proposed venue (the San Diego Sports Arena) and the adequacy of hotel space. Wilson proclaimed the week of the convention to be America's Finest City Week, which became an annual event and gave rise to San Diego's unofficial nickname.

In 1972, Wilson recruited Clarence M. Pendleton Jr. to head the Model Cities Program in San Diego. In 1981, President Ronald Reagan appointed Pendleton to chair the United States Commission on Civil Rights, a position that he held from 1981 until his death in San Diego in 1988.

== United States Senator from California (1983–1991) ==
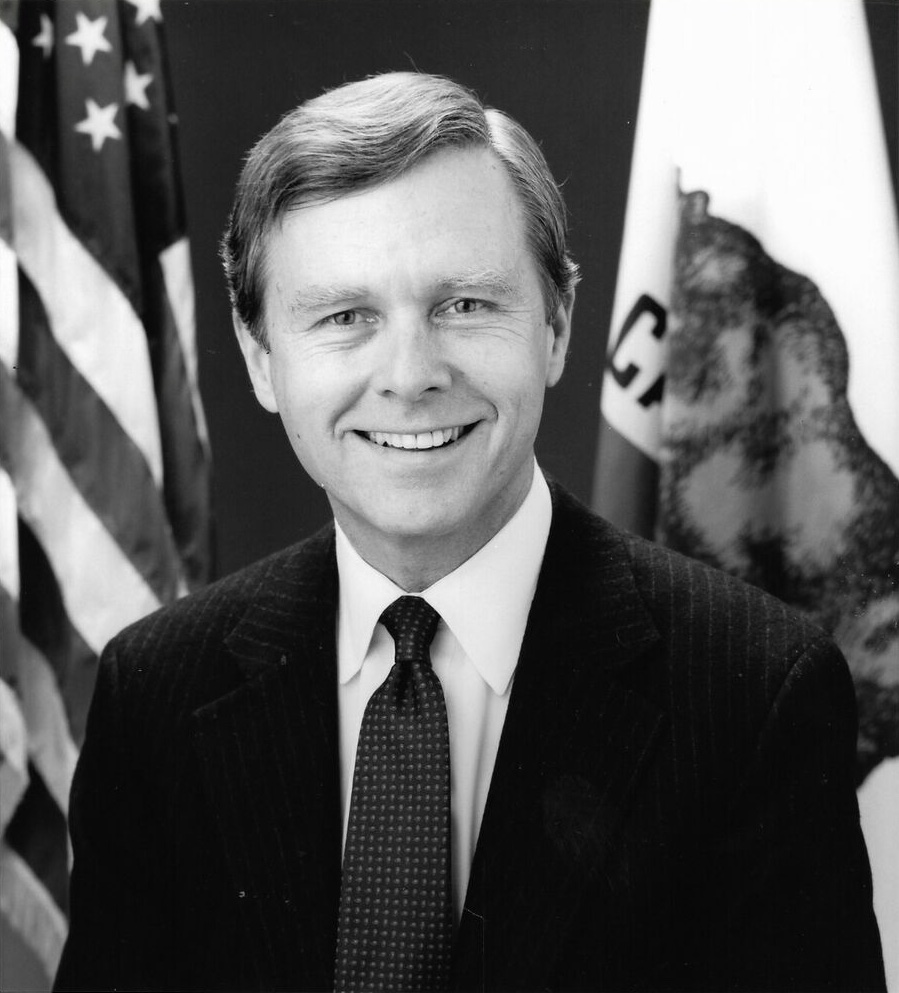
Wilson as U.S. Senator, 1989

In 1982, Wilson won the Republican primary in California to replace the retiring U.S. Senator S. I. Hayakawa. Wilson's Democratic opponent was the outgoing two-term Governor Jerry Brown. Wilson was known as a fiscal conservative who supported the property-tax limiting Proposition 13, although Wilson had opposed the measure while mayor of San Diego. However, Brown ran on his gubernatorial record of building the largest state budget surpluses in California history. Both Wilson and Brown were moderate-to-liberal on social issues, including support for abortion rights and environmentalism. The election was expected to be close, with Brown holding a slim lead in most of the polls leading up to Election Day. Wilson hammered away at Brown's appointment of California Chief Justice Rose Bird, using this to portray himself as tougher on crime than Brown was. Brown's late entry into the 1980 Democratic presidential primary, after promising not to run, was also an issue. President Ronald Reagan made a number of visits to California late in the race to campaign for Wilson. Reagan quipped that the last thing he wanted to see was both of his home state's U.S. Senate seats falling into Democrats' hands, especially to be occupied by the man who succeeded him as governor. Despite exit polls indicating a narrow Brown victory, Wilson edged him out to win the election. A major contributing factor may also have been a late influx of the Armenian vote in the California Governor's race between George Deukmejian and Tom Bradley. Many of these votes came from heavily Republican areas. The Deukmejian voters likely also voted for Wilson for United States Senator.

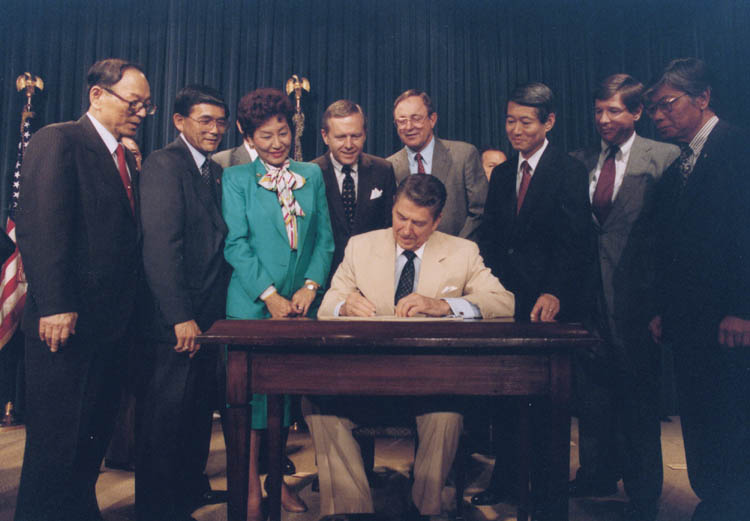
President Reagan signing the Civil Liberties Act with Wilson looking on

On October 19, 1983, Wilson voted in favor of a bill establishing Martin Luther King Jr. Day. The legislation was signed into law by President Reagan the following month. In January 1988, Wilson voted in favor of the Civil Rights Restoration Act of 1987 (as well as to override President Reagan's veto in March).

In June 1984, Wilson voted in favor of legislation restricting federal highway funds for states that did not raise the minimum age for drinking to 21.

In May 1985, Wilson underwent surgery for a ruptured appendix at Bethesda Naval Hospital, concurrently as fellow Republican senator Bob Dole hoped to gather enough votes for the Reagan administration's 1986 budget. The surgery was expected to keep Wilson hospitalized for days, but Wilson returned to Capitol Hill via an ambulance to cast a vote in favor of the budget on May 10. After voting, Wilson stated he made the decision to forgo further bed rest as he believed the vote was possibly the most important of his career.

Convinced by Japanese-American farmers in the Central Valley to support redress, Wilson co-sponsored the Civil Liberties Act of 1988. The bill was signed into law by President Reagan.

As a member of the Senate Armed Services Committee, he called for early implementation of President Reagan's Strategic Defense Initiative, a national ballistic missile defense system.

Wilson also co-sponsored the Federal Intergovernmental Regulatory Relief Act requiring the federal government to reimburse states for the cost of new federal mandates. A fiscal conservative, he was named the Senate's "Watchdog of the Treasury" for each of his eight years in the nation's capital.

In 1988, Wilson won the race for the United States Senate against his Democratic opponent, Leo T. McCarthy. In that election, he became the first person to get more than 5 million votes in a single Senate race, and his 5.1 million votes was a record for the most won by a Republican candidate for Senator that wasn't broken until 2020, when John Cornyn of Texas topped it.

On January 20, 1989, he presided over the inauguration of George H. W. Bush as President of the United States. He voted against Omnibus Budget Reconciliation Act of 1990, Bush's tax increase, thus remaining a fiscal conservative.

In the weeks following incumbent governor of California George Deukmejian announcing that he was not running for a third term, Wilson considered a gubernatorial bid; by late January 1989, Wilson admitted to the decision being agonizing for him amid his consulting with others on a possible run. At the beginning of his second six-year term in the Senate, Wilson announced plans to run for Governor of California.

On October 2, 1990, Wilson, away from Washington to campaign for California governor, became the only sitting senator from either party to not vote on the nomination of David Souter for Associate Justice on the United States Supreme Court. He had previously endorsed Souter for confirmation. Wilson voted in favor of the Robert Bork Supreme Court nomination.

On January 7, 1991, he resigned from the Senate upon his inauguration as California's governor and appointed John Seymour as his successor.

== Governor of California ==
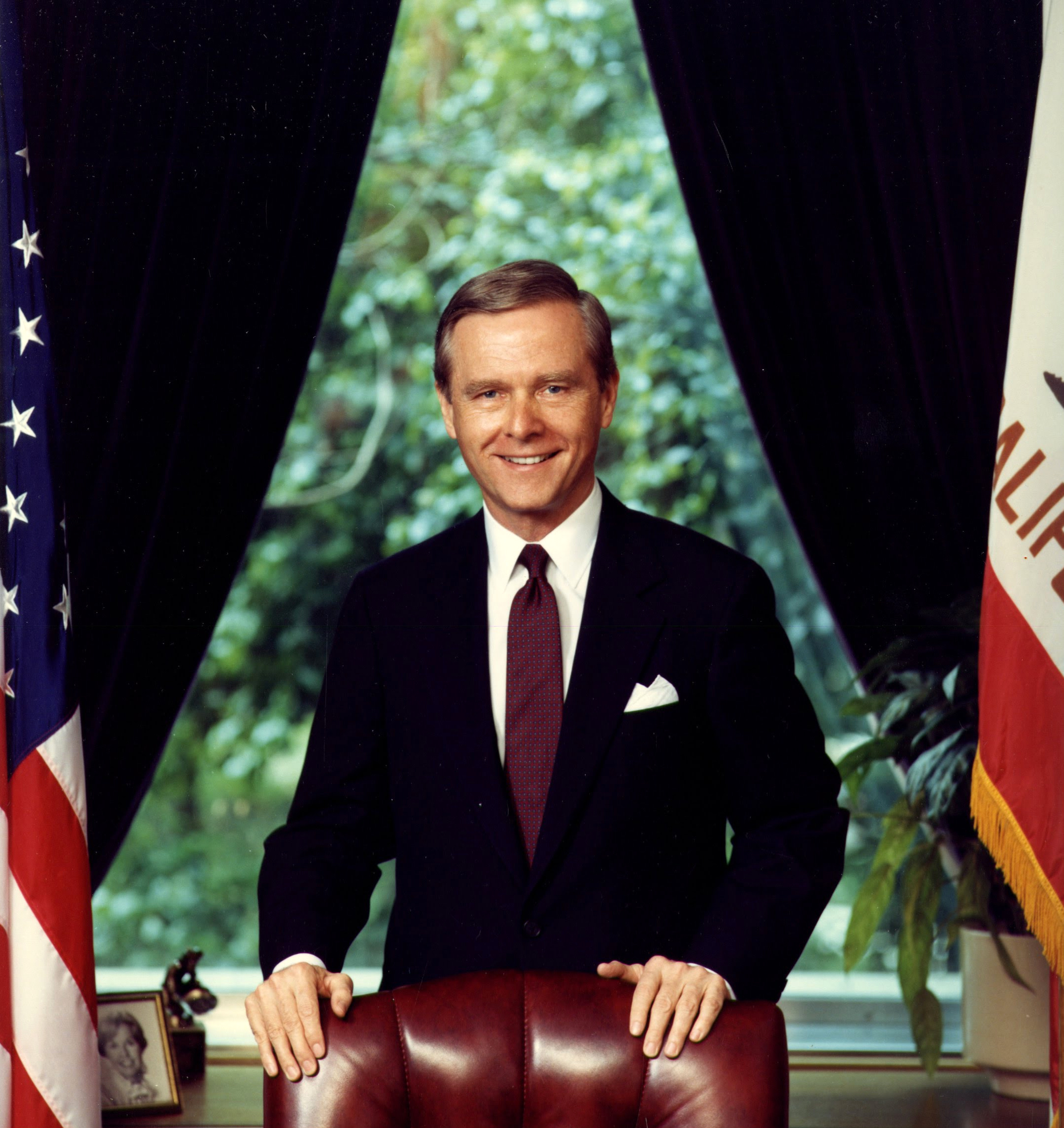
Wilson's official portrait during his first term as governor, 1991

Wilson won the Republican nomination for Governor of California to succeed two-term Republican governor George Deukmejian, who chose not to seek a third term in 1990. In the general election, he defeated Democratic former San Francisco mayor Dianne Feinstein, who would go on to be elected to Wilson's former U.S. Senate seat two years later. Wilson was sworn in as governor on January 7, 1991.

As governor, Wilson oversaw economic recovery in California, just as the rest of the country was recovering from an economic slump. Inheriting the state's worst economy since the Great Depression, Wilson insisted on strict budget discipline and sought to rehabilitate the state's environment for investment and new job creation. During his term, market-based, unsubsidized health coverage was made available for employees of small businesses.

Despite his belief in fiscal conservatism, Wilson raised sales tax rates to reduce the state deficit, including instituting a new sales tax on newspapers as well as a sales tax on "snack" foods. He also raised car license fees and college tuition; by 1991, tuition fees at the University of California rose by 40%, while they rose by 24% at California State University. Additionally, he raised the income tax in the top bracket temporarily. However, by 1993, the snack tax was repealed by the Democratic state legislature and the sales tax increase expired. On April 26, 1991, Wilson proposed an increase in the sales tax by 1 1/4 cents and state taxes by $6.7 billion (equivalent to $14.1 billion in 2025) as part of plan to reduce the state's budget deficit. The revenue gap had increased by $5 billion (equivalent to $10.5 billion in 2025) in the four months of his governorship. In response to the April 1991 proposal, the Los Angeles Times wrote of Wilson,

He has done what has been asked of him, but thought near-impossible for any Republican centrist: constructing a revenue and spending plan that will hurt almost everyone and help almost no one, but that will also – for the first time in a long time – put the state on a sounder fiscal footing.

In July 1991, the Senate voted 28 to 9 in favor of a bipartisan tax plan that would have increased taxes on the wealthiest Californians, increased the corporate tax rate, and imposed a tax increase on telecommunication services by 2%. Wilson returned the budget bill to the legislature without his signature, revoking a prior commitment to vetoing the measure.

On July 12, 1991, Wilson signed a bill mandating that parents neglecting to pay child support could be levied stiff fines and potential suspensions of business and professional licenses. The legislation was intended to address an increasingly serious cause of poverty among children and women in the state at a time when Californians collectively owed $2 billion (equivalent to $4.21 billion in 2025) per year in unpaid child support. On July 24, 1991, Wilson signed a bill requiring mass transit rail lines to be built underground in the event construction took place in the residential neighborhoods of North Hollywood and Van Nuys. The bill, requested by the residents of those neighborhoods, was aimed at easing "homeowners' fear of noise from ground-level trains running along a proposed rail route that paralleled Chandler and Victory boulevards".

Less than a year into his first term as governor, Wilson vetoed AB 101, a bill written to prohibit employment discrimination based on sexual orientation in the state. Wilson feared that the bill would lead to more lawsuits and make California less economically competitive . The veto was met with protests in San Francisco that included demonstrations during Wilson's subsequent public appearances and speeches. Wilson was the driving force behind the 1996 legislation that deregulated the state's energy market, which was the first energy utilities deregulation in the U.S. and aggressively pushed by companies such as Enron.

Wilson also enacted education reforms aimed at creating statewide curriculum standards, reducing class sizes and replacing social promotion with early remedial education. Wilson promoted standardized testing of all students, increased teacher training, and a longer school year. However, it was Wilson's uncompromising stance on reducing education spending that led to the budget impasse of 1992, leaving state workers without paychecks from July until September, when the California Supreme Court forced the Governor and the legislature to agree to terms that ended the sixty-three-day stand-off. On February 22, 1993, Wilson issued an executive order banning smoking in a majority of state buildings excluding only "buildings controlled by the courts, the Legislature or the state's two university systems". The order was set to take effect December 31 of that year. Wilson said secondhand smoke "threatens the health of non-smoking state employees" and alleged workplace smoking increased the cost of cleaning, damaged furniture and carpets, and heightened the chances of starting fires.

Despite this, in a leaked Philip Morris memo, the company's chief executive, Hamish Maxwell, said, "You will be pleased to know that Pete is still 'pro-tobacco.'" His move to revoke Proposition 99, a $114 million dollar voter-approved bill to tax cigarette companies to research and educate on the effects of tobacco, while also shutting down a highly effective anti-tobacco ad with footage of tobacco executives testifying to Congress that nicotine was not addictive which also a prompted defamation lawsuit against it), was claimed to be illegal and caused multiple lawsuits, while also being criticized as serving the tobacco lobby’s interests. While he claimed to take no funding personally in response to allegations of being pro-tobacco, he collected over $100,000 from a New York fund-raising dinner organized by Phillip Morris. While Phillip Morris didn't directly fund his campaign, they were major funders of the California Republican Party which he led. The leaked memo was in response to worries over Wilson's rejection of direct campaign donations. Maxwell claimed to have been told by Wilson over a phone call that this was to "protect Hamish and himself," being assured that it was not due to a lack of support.

In late 1993, Wilson traveled to Asia to promote Californian goods and investment opportunities for overseas investors. Wilson's six-day tour was also marked by his insistence on creating export-oriented jobs. Wilson was re-elected to a second gubernatorial term in 1994, gaining 55% of the vote in his race against Democratic State Treasurer Kathleen Brown, daughter of former California governor Pat Brown. According to one study, Wilson exploited anti-immigrant sentiment to win re-election. Wilson spoke at the funeral services for former first lady Pat Nixon in 1993 and former president Richard M. Nixon in 1994 at the Nixon Library in Yorba Linda, California. Two years later, Wilson became, to date, the most recent governor to speak at a California gubernatorial funeral, that of former Governor Pat Brown.

For most of his time as governor, Wilson reduced per-capita infrastructure spending for California, much as he had done as the mayor of San Diego. Many construction projects – most notably highway expansion/improvement projects – were severely hindered or delayed, while other maintenance and construction projects were abandoned completely. Term limit laws passed by voters as Proposition 140, and championed by Wilson in 1990, prohibited Wilson from running for re-election to a third term. At the end of his time in office, Wilson left California with a $16 billion budget surplus (equivalent to $29.4 billion in 2025). He was succeeded by then-lieutenant governor Gray Davis as governor. A September 1998 Los Angeles Times poll found 55% of registered voters in California had a favorable view of Wilson's job performance.

=== Welfare ===
On December 14, 1991, in an address to Howard Jarvis Taxpayers Association, Wilson criticized the Democratic leaders of the state legislature for their opposition to his budget-balancing plan and "spent most of his hour at the Biltmore Hotel in downtown Los Angeles railing against the state's entitlement programs – including education and Medi-Cal, but especially Aid to Families with Dependent Children and other welfare programs". On January 8, 1993, Wilson submitted his 1993 spending plan, advocating an immediate cut in welfare grants by 4.2% that would be followed 6 months later by a larger reduction of 15% to be directed at recipient families with an able-bodied adult. The twin cuts would reduce California's standing as the 5th highest benefit granting state to the 12th.

By the end of his first term, Wilson allied with members of the state legislature that supported the continuation of recession-inspired cuts to welfare benefits. A bill imposing the continued reduction of benefits was passed by 2 committees of the Republican-majority assembly. H. D. Palmer maintained Wilson's priorities rested in other areas and though admitting to an improvement in revenues, disclosed that "the governor does not believe that the first call on those revenues should go to double-digit cost-of-living increases for welfare recipients."

Wilson's second inaugural address featured a proclamation that the administration would initiate welfare reform:

We will demand that all citizens meet the test of common decency, respecting the rights of others, and we will demand that those who can, pull their own weight and meet the test of personal responsibility. We will make clear that welfare is to be a safety net, not a hammock — and absolutely not a permanent way of life. We will correct our laws to make clear that bringing a child into the world is an awesome personal responsibility for both the mother and the father. The costs are simply too high for society to continue tolerating the promiscuity and irresponsibility that have produced generations of unwed teen mothers. It is monstrously unfair to the children; to their sad, ill-equipped teen mothers; and certainly to working taxpayers, who must support them at a cost to their own children.

Pete Wilson, who benefited from Valdez’s expertise in his campaigns for both the U.S. Senate and California governor, considered her a longtime close friend.

“With the exception of Ronald Reagan, Joyce Valdez is probably responsible for more of the successes of the Republican Party in California than anyone else in history,” Wilson said in a statement after her death. “She never had an event that wasn’t a huge success because she simply refused to accept failure.”

He ended his accolade warmly: “She lightened our hearts as she lightened our pockets. Advice to St. Peter: Don’t even try to hang onto your wallet. With Joyce’s energy and charm, you don’t have a chance!”

https://www.latimes.com/archives/la-xpm-1999-may-03-mn-33472-story.html

In his 1997 State of the State address, Wilson criticized welfare recipients and charged the program with creating conditions producing out-of-wedlock births, the lack of paternal involvement in the lives of children, and lifelong ramifications to children caused by the absence of fathers. Under Wilson's welfare overhaul package, mothers would have to go to work after two years and they would only be eligible to return to welfare a year after that. Additionally, eligibility for welfare would only last for five years. Paternity for each child would also have to be established for the mother to begin receiving benefits.

=== Immigration & Proposition 187 ===
As governor, Wilson was closely associated with California Proposition 187, a 1994 ballot initiative to establish a state-run citizenship screening system and prohibit illegal immigrants from using health care, public education, and other social services in the U.S. State of California. Voters passed the proposed law as a referendum in November 1994; it was the first time that a state had passed legislation related to immigration, customarily a federal matter. The law was challenged in a court, found unconstitutional by a federal court in 1998, and never went into effect.

Passage of Proposition 187 reflected state residents' concerns about illegal immigration into the United States. Opponents believed the proposition was discriminatory and unfairly targeted children, while turning tens of thousands of adults into government informants; supporters generally insisted that their concerns were economic: that the state could not afford to provide social services to so many who entered the state illegally or overstayed their visas. Wilson himself would state that the policy was "about supporting the people who came here the right way".

Opponents of Proposition 187 cited its passage as the cause of a long-term decline in support for the Republican Party in California. Noting a rapid increase in Latino participation in California elections, some analysts cite Wilson and the Republican Party's embrace of Proposition 187 as a cause of the failure of the party to win statewide elections. Governor Arnold Schwarzenegger is the only Republican to win a California gubernatorial, senatorial, or presidential election since 1994, via a unique 2003 recall election and then a re-election in 2006.

Since 1995 the following states have had similar ballot initiatives or laws passed: Arizona, Colorado, Florida, Georgia, Illinois, Nevada, New Mexico, New York, Oklahoma and Texas.

=== Policies on crime ===
Wilson led efforts to enact "tough on crime" measures and signed into law the "Three Strikes" (25 years to life for repeat offenders) As a result of the Three Strikes Law, 4,431 offenders have been sentenced to prison terms ranging from 25 years to life for their offenses. The law required the construction of new prisons, leading some to question the influence the California Correctional Peace Officers Association had over his campaign, as that prison guard lobbying organization gave $1.47 million (equivalent to $2.78 million in 2025) to Wilson's gubernatorial campaigns. On September 26, 1995, Wilson signed a bill authorizing the possible use of capital punishment toward any individual who committed a murder during a carjacking or killed a juror. Wilson said the law was the result of 4 years' worth of attempts on his part to toughen the laws against carjacking: "This bill sends an unmistakable message to gang bangers: If you take someone's life while committing a cowardly carjacking, you can expect to pay for your crime with your own life." Wilson also supported the resumption of capital punishment in California, after a 25-year moratorium, and he signed the death warrant for the execution of child-murderer Robert Alton Harris, answering criticism of Harris’ actions stemming from childhood abuse in a heartfelt comment that ”as much as I cry for Robert Alton Harris the boy, I cannot pardon Robert Alton Harris the man”. Harris was executed shortly after. in April 1992. A total of five people were executed during his administration (the first two in the gas chamber, the latter three by lethal injection).

=== Energy deregulation ===
Wilson supported deregulation of the energy industry in California during his administration due to heavy lobbying efforts by Enron. Nevertheless, during the California energy crisis caused by companies such as Enron, Wilson authored an article titled "What California Must Do" that blamed Gray Davis for not building enough power plants. Wilson defended his record of power plant construction and claimed that between 1985 and 1998, 23 plants were certified and 18 were built in California.

Historians have suggested that Wilson's willingness to deregulate and commoditize California energy was also a major cause of the subsequent 2000–2001 California electricity crisis.

== 1996 presidential campaign ==
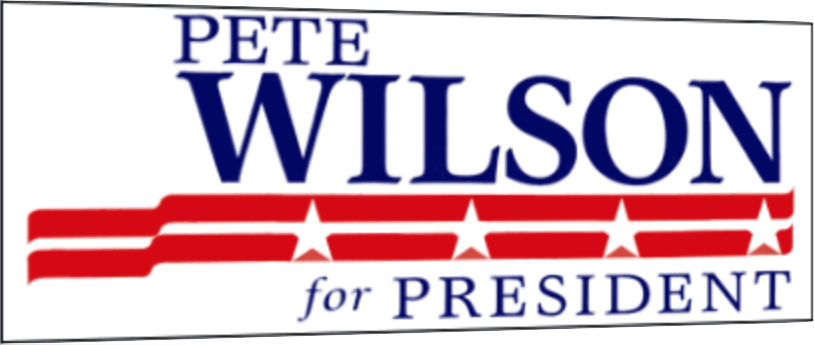
Wilson's presidential campaign logo

Despite a campaign promise to the people of California not to do so, Wilson also unsuccessfully ran for the Republican nomination for President in the 1996 election, making formal announcements on both coasts. Wilson announced first on August 28, 1995, in New York City, at Battery Park, with the Statue of Liberty as a backdrop. He completed a cross-country tour. In April 1995, he had surgery to remove a benign nodule on his vocal cords. When Wilson did not lighten his speaking schedule, it resulted in the occasional cracking of his voice. It ended up keeping him from announcing – or even talking – for months. His campaign ended on September 30, 1995.

A September 6, 1995, UC Irvine poll showed equal support for Wilson and incumbent president Bill Clinton among Orange County voters. The same poll indicated Wilson as trailing his former Senate colleague Bob Dole by a 20-point margin. Dole would become the Republican nominee in the general election. Later that month, a Los Angeles Times poll found 23% of Californians believed Wilson should seek the presidency, including 30% of state voters identifying as Republican. On September 29, 1995, Wilson told supporters in Sacramento that he was dropping out of the Republican primary, citing he lacked the "necessary campaign funds to take this message to the people who need to hear it". He became the first candidate to exit the Republican primary.

== Post-political careers and commemoration ==
After leaving office, Wilson spent two years as a managing director of Pacific Capital Group, a merchant bank based in Los Angeles. He has served as a director of the Irvine Company, TelePacific Communications, Inc., National Information Consortium Inc., an advisor to Crossflo Systems, and IDT Entertainment. He has been a member of the Board of Advisors of Thomas Weisel Partners, a San Francisco merchant bank. He also served as chairman of the Japan Task Force of the Pacific Council on International Policy, which produced an analysis of Japanese economic and national security prospects over the next decade entitled "Can Japan Come Back?"

Wilson is currently a distinguished visiting fellow at the Hoover Institution, a conservative think tank located on the campus of Stanford University; the Ronald Reagan Presidential Foundation; the Richard Nixon Foundation; and the Donald Bren Foundation. He is the founding director of the California Mentor Foundation and is the chairman of the board of trustees of the National World War II Museum. Wilson sits on two prestigious Federal advisory committees: the President's Foreign Intelligence Advisory Board and the Defense Policy Board Advisory Committee. He previously worked as a consultant at the Los Angeles office of Bingham McCutchen LLP, a large, national law firm, and is currently Of Counsel with boutique law firm Ellis George Cipollone. He is also a Principal at Wilson Walsh Consulting.

In 1999, Wilson was awarded the prestigious Patriot Award by the Congressional Medal of Honor Society at its national convention in Riverside, California. In 2003, Wilson was co-chair of Arnold Schwarzenegger's successful campaign to recall and replace Governor Gray Davis.

In 2007, a statue of Wilson joined Ernest Hahn and Alonzo Horton on the San Diego Walk of Fame. Two hundred sponsors donated $200,000 to build the statue. On May 23, 2009, Wilson gave the commencement speech and received an honorary degree from San Diego State University's College of Professional Studies and Fine Arts. In 2009, Wilson chaired the unsuccessful campaign of Meg Whitman for governor.

On April 30, 2016, Wilson endorsed U.S. senator Ted Cruz for the Republican nomination in the 2016 presidential election. On April 4, 2019, Wilson donated $5,000 to the reelection campaign of President Donald Trump. Wilson was among the signatories of a letter released on October 1, 2020, endorsing President Trump for reelection in the 2020 presidential election and argued in an interview that the president "has very good judgment, and very good people around him making honest calls." He served as a campaign advisor for Larry Elder's unsuccessful 2021 campaign to recall and replace Governor Gavin Newsom.

== Honors and awards ==
During and after Wilson's career, he was awarded numerous awards and honors:

- The Woodrow Wilson Awards for Distinguished Public Service
- The Patriots Award by the Congressional Medal of Honor Society
- An honorary degree from the San Diego State College of Professional Studies and Fine Arts
- The Distinguished Alumnus Award from Boalt Hall, UC Berkeley
- The Bernard E. Witkin Amicus Curiae Award given by the Judicial Council of California
- Wilson was also honored by the San Francisco Giants by having him open their 1998 home schedule by throwing out the ceremonial first pitch in honor of his final full year in office.
- Governor Pete Wilson Liberty Flagstaff was raised at The National WWII Museum in New Orleans in June 2017. The spire that bears Wilson's name serves as an enduring symbol of the unique American spirit—unity, resolve, and devotion to the principles of freedom.
- Wilson was honored by the secretary of defense with the Office of the Secretary of Defense Medal for Exceptional Public Service in November 2018, including his service on the Defense Policy Board Advisory Committee.

Political offices
Preceded by Frank Curran	Mayor of San Diego; 1971–1983	Succeeded by Bill Cleator; Acting
Preceded by George Deukmejian	Governor of California; 1991–1999	Succeeded by Gray Davis
Party political offices
Preceded by S. I. Hayakawa	Republican nominee for U.S. Senator from California (Class 1); 1982, 1988	Succeeded by John F. Seymour
Preceded by George Deukmejian	Republican nominee for Governor of California; 1990, 1994	Succeeded by Dan Lungren
U.S. Senate
Preceded by S. I. Hayakawa	U.S. Senator (Class 1) from California; 1983–1991; Served alongside: Alan Cranston	Succeeded by John F. Seymour
U.S. order of precedence (ceremonial)
Preceded by Lincoln Chafee as Former US Senator	Order of precedence of the United States	Succeeded by Al Franken as Former US Senator
