= Utah's 24th State Senate district =

American legislative district

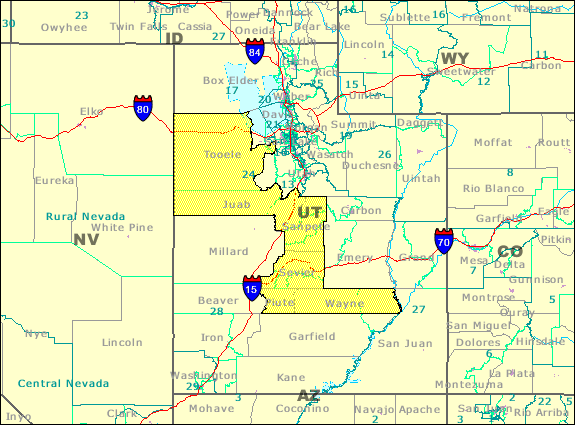
Map of the 24th Utah Senate District.

The 24th Utah Senate District is located in Juab, Piute, Sanpete, Sevier, Tooele and Wayne Counties and includes Utah House Districts 1, 21, 67, 68, 69, 70 and 73. The current State Senator representing the 24th district is Ralph Okerlund, a Republican from Monroe who replaced Darin Peterson. Peterson opted not to pursue re-election in 2008 due to health concerns. Okerlund defeated Tobiah "Toby" Dillon (D) from Tooele City, and Benton L. Peterson (C) from Manti in the 2008 election.

== Previous Utah State Senators (District 24) ==
Name	Party	Term
Darin Peterson	Republican	2005–2009
Leonard M. Blackham	Republican	2003–2004
Peter C. Knudson	Republican	1999–2002
John P. Holmgren	Republican	1985–1999
Miles Cap Ferry	Republican	1973–1984
Ralph A. Preece	Republican	1969–1972
Samuel J. Taylor	Republican	1967

== Election results ==
=== 2016 general election ===
Utah State Senate election, 2016
Party	Candidate	Votes	%	±%
Republican	Ralph Okerlund (unopposed)	--	--	

=== 2012 general election ===
Utah State Senate election, 2012
Party	Candidate	Votes	%	±%
Republican	Ralph Okerlund	29,588	86.4	
Constitution	Trestin Meacham	4,647	13.6	

=== 2008 general election ===
Utah State Senate election, 2008
Party	Candidate	Votes	%	±%
Republican	Ralph Okerlund	19,073	67.6	
Democratic	Tobiah Dillon	6,471	22.9	
Constitution	Benton L. Peterson	2,666	9.5	

=== 2006 general election ===
Utah State Senate election, 2006
Party	Candidate	Votes	%	±%
Republican	Darin Peterson	14,893	68.1	
Democratic	Don Foutz	5,173	23.7	
Constitution	Gary R. VanHorn	1,796	8.2	

== See also ==
- Darin Peterson
- Utah Democratic Party
- Utah Republican Party
- Utah Senate
