= 1994 California lieutenant gubernatorial election =

- November 8, 1994
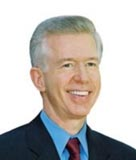

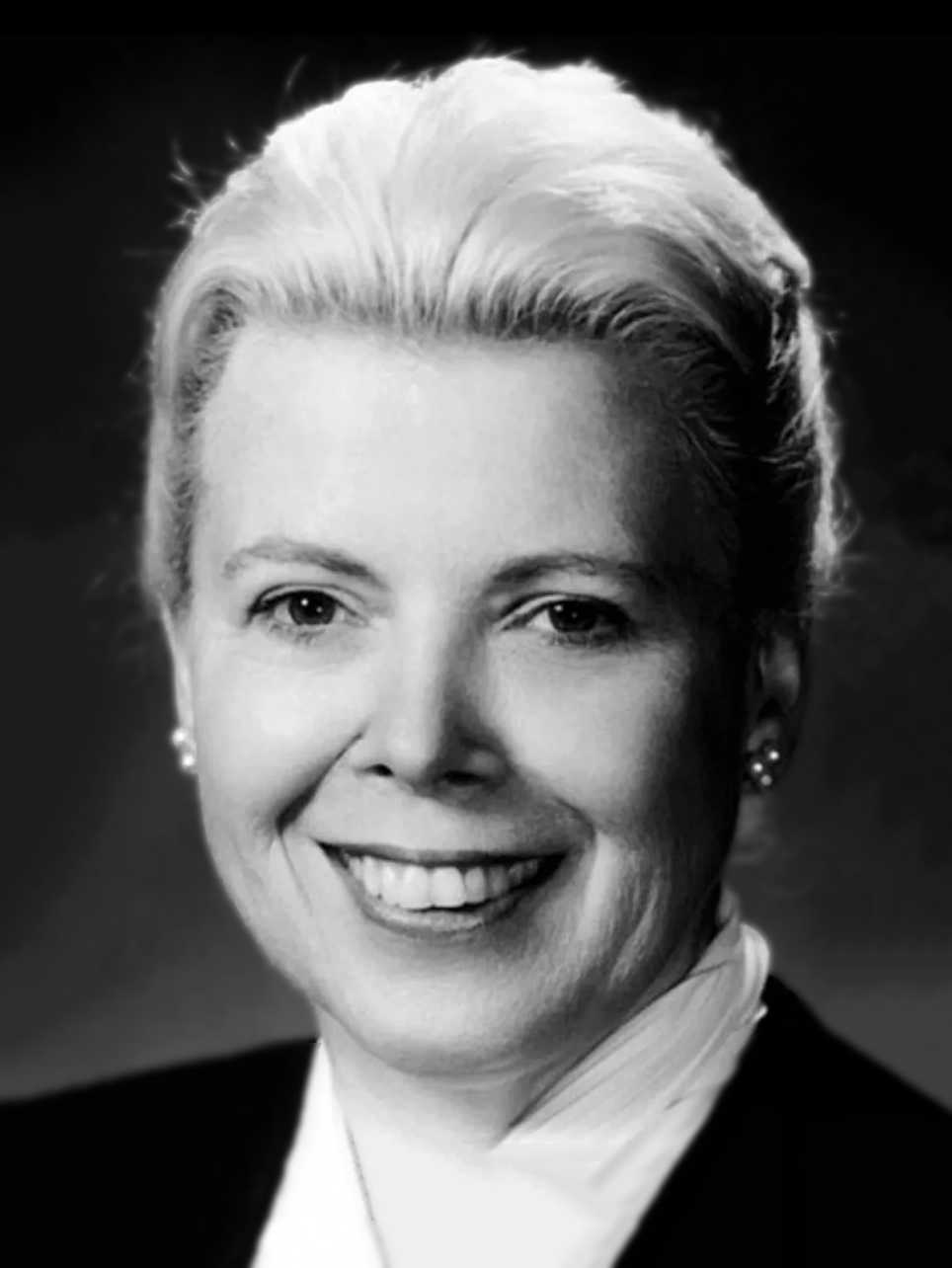
| Nominee | Gray Davis | Cathie Wright |
| Party | Democratic | Republican |
| Popular vote | 4,441,429 | 3,412,777 |
| Percentage | 52.42% | 40.28% |
- County results Davis: 40–50% 50–60% 60–70% Wright: 40–50% 50–60%
Lieutenant Governor before election
Leo T. McCarthy
Democratic
Elected Lieutenant Governor
Gray Davis
Democratic

The 1994 California lieutenant gubernatorial election occurred on November 8, 1994. The primary elections took place on March 8, 1994. State Controller Gray Davis, the Democratic nominee, decisively defeated the Republican nominee, State Senator Cathie Wright, to succeed incumbent Leo T. McCarthy, who was retiring after three terms.

== Primary results ==
Final results from the Secretary of State of California

=== Democratic ===
California Lt. Governor Democratic primary, 1994
| Candidate | Votes | % |
|---|---|---|
| Gray Davis | 1,992,320 | 80.79 |
| Philip R. Ashamallah | 473,848 | 18.21 |
| Total votes | 2,466,168 | 100.00 |

=== Republican ===
California Lt. Governor Republican primary, 1994
| Candidate | Votes | % |
|---|---|---|
| Cathie Wright | 1,178,369 | 62.72 |
| Stan Statham | 700,451 | 37.28 |
| Total votes | 1,878,820 | 100.00 |

=== Green ===
California Lt. Governor Green primary, 1994
| Candidate | Votes | % |
|---|---|---|
| Daniel Moses | 12,186 | 71.40 |
| None of the above | 4,881 | 28.60 |
| Total votes | 17,067 | 100.00 |

=== Others ===
California Lt. Governor primary, 1994 (Others)
| Party | Candidate | Votes | % |
|---|---|---|---|
| American Independent | Robert W. Lewis | 18,171 | 100.00 |
| Libertarian | Bob New | 13,753 | 100.00 |
| Peace and Freedom | Jamie Luis Gomez | 4,465 | 100.00 |

== General election results ==
Final results from the Secretary of State of California.

1994 lieutenant governor election, California
| Party | Candidate | Votes | % |
|---|---|---|---|
| Democratic | Gray Davis | 4,441,429 | 52.42% |
| Republican | Cathie Wright | 3,412,777 | 40.28% |
| Peace and Freedom | Jaime Luis Gomez | 185,254 | 2.19% |
| Libertarian | Bob New | 180,896 | 2.13% |
| Green | Daniel Moses | 160,093 | 1.89% |
| American Independent | Robert W. Lewis | 92,642 | 1.09% |
| Invalid or blank votes | | 235,261 | 2.64% |
| Total votes | | 8,473,091 | 100.00% |
| Turnout | | | 45.96% |
| Democratic hold | | | |

=== Results by county ===
| County | Davis | Votes | Wright | Votes | Gomez | Votes | New | Votes | Others | Votes |
|---|---|---|---|---|---|---|---|---|---|---|
| San Francisco | 69.68% | 158,442 | 16.94% | 38,516 | 2.56% | 5,812 | 1.64% | 3,732 | 9.18% | 20,881 |
| Alameda | 67.21% | 262,947 | 23.82% | 93,184 | 2.12% | 8,294 | 1.85% | 7,235 | 5.01% | 19,589 |
| San Mateo | 61.70% | 129,434 | 30.93% | 64,878 | 1.80% | 3,777 | 2.02% | 4,241 | 3.55% | 7,458 |
| Marin | 59.89% | 61,795 | 28.75% | 29,661 | 1.21% | 1,248 | 2.30% | 2,368 | 7.85% | 8,105 |
| Sonoma | 59.69% | 93,746 | 31.34% | 49,231 | 1.83% | 2,878 | 2.50% | 3,927 | 4.64% | 7,280 |
| Yolo | 58.64% | 28,557 | 32.91% | 16,027 | 2.39% | 1,165 | 2.08% | 1,011 | 3.98% | 1,940 |
| Los Angeles | 58.05% | 1,170,122 | 35.34% | 712,252 | 2.78% | 55,958 | 1.72% | 34,655 | 2.11% | 42,601 |
| Solano | 57.75% | 56,311 | 35.59% | 34,698 | 1.87% | 1,826 | 1.94% | 1,890 | 2.85% | 2,778 |
| Santa Clara | 57.60% | 250,445 | 34.06% | 148,092 | 2.11% | 9,181 | 2.90% | 12,593 | 3.34% | 14,517 |
| Santa Cruz | 56.87% | 51,155 | 30.24% | 27,203 | 2.90% | 2,612 | 3.52% | 3,170 | 6.46% | 5,813 |
| Napa | 56.36% | 23,756 | 36.67% | 15,457 | 1.41% | 596 | 2.23% | 938 | 3.34% | 1,406 |
| Mendocino | 56.27% | 16,530 | 32.13% | 9,439 | 2.90% | 852 | 3.24% | 953 | 5.45% | 1,602 |
| Contra Costa | 56.06% | 165,014 | 37.82% | 111,301 | 1.43% | 4,208 | 1.88% | 5,541 | 2.81% | 8,264 |
| Lake | 55.60% | 10,847 | 37.82% | 7,379 | 1.16% | 227 | 2.55% | 498 | 2.86% | 559 |
| Sacramento | 55.58% | 196,514 | 38.68% | 136,768 | 1.50% | 5,290 | 1.97% | 6,958 | 2.27% | 8,046 |
| Stanislaus | 53.35% | 53,120 | 41.17% | 40,992 | 1.78% | 1,769 | 1.43% | 1,428 | 2.27% | 2,257 |
| Del Norte | 53.19% | 3,936 | 40.30% | 2,982 | 1.11% | 82 | 2.45% | 181 | 2.96% | 219 |
| Amador | 52.97% | 6,925 | 42.06% | 5,498 | 0.67% | 88 | 2.30% | 301 | 1.99% | 261 |
| Monterey | 52.87% | 47,979 | 39.86% | 36,172 | 2.40% | 2,178 | 1.98% | 1,799 | 2.89% | 2,620 |
| San Joaquin | 52.65% | 66,801 | 42.29% | 53,649 | 1.90% | 2,407 | 1.40% | 1,776 | 1.77% | 2,238 |
| San Benito | 52.13% | 6,057 | 39.17% | 4,551 | 3.13% | 364 | 2.96% | 344 | 2.62% | 304 |
| Humboldt | 52.12% | 24,544 | 34.55% | 16,272 | 1.72% | 811 | 2.44% | 1,147 | 9.17% | 4,319 |
| Tuolumne | 51.06% | 9,989 | 43.72% | 8,554 | 0.72% | 140 | 2.03% | 397 | 2.47% | 484 |
| Merced | 50.67% | 19,709 | 43.57% | 16,947 | 2.33% | 908 | 1.47% | 571 | 1.96% | 762 |
| Imperial | 49.14% | 11,626 | 39.29% | 9,294 | 7.54% | 1,784 | 1.33% | 315 | 2.70% | 638 |
| Fresno | 48.80% | 86,265 | 45.60% | 80,608 | 2.50% | 4,425 | 1.15% | 2,041 | 1.94% | 3,429 |
| Kings | 48.67% | 10,925 | 45.43% | 10,199 | 2.62% | 588 | 1.14% | 256 | 2.13% | 480 |
| Calaveras | 47.74% | 7,503 | 45.09% | 7,086 | 1.05% | 165 | 3.14% | 493 | 2.98% | 469 |
| Lassen | 47.33% | 3,839 | 44.17% | 3,583 | 1.47% | 119 | 3.43% | 278 | 3.60% | 192 |
| Mariposa | 47.17% | 3,360 | 46.37% | 3,303 | 0.86% | 61 | 2.18% | 155 | 3.42% | 244 |
| Santa Barbara | 46.80% | 60,516 | 46.09% | 59,602 | 2.39% | 3,094 | 2.06% | 2,666 | 2.66% | 3,436 |
| Plumas | 46.44% | 3,939 | 46.42% | 3,937 | 1.20% | 102 | 2.52% | 214 | 3.41% | 289 |
| Siskiyou | 46.10% | 8,349 | 45.05% | 8,158 | 1.29% | 233 | 2.86% | 518 | 4.70% | 852 |
| San Bernardino | 45.91% | 157,449 | 46.45% | 159,297 | 2.66% | 9,119 | 2.31% | 7,935 | 1.67% | 9,162 |
| Trinity | 45.67% | 2,460 | 41.49% | 2,235 | 1.95% | 105 | 4.42% | 238 | 6.47% | 349 |
| Riverside | 45.43% | 154,591 | 47.81% | 162,715 | 2.24% | 7,609 | 2.24% | 7,621 | 2.28% | 6,776 |
| Colusa | 45.06% | 2,254 | 49.64% | 2,483 | 1.60% | 80 | 1.64% | 82 | 2.06% | 103 |
| San Luis Obispo | 44.95% | 38,472 | 47.47% | 40,626 | 1.56% | 1,333 | 2.57% | 2,197 | 3.46% | 2,962 |
| Madera | 44.86% | 11,939 | 50.04% | 13,318 | 1.83% | 488 | 1.38% | 366 | 1.89% | 503 |
| Butte | 44.79% | 30,332 | 48.52% | 32,856 | 1.46% | 988 | 2.28% | 1,541 | 2.96% | 2,005 |
| Sierra | 44.77% | 727 | 45.38% | 737 | 1.48% | 24 | 3.88% | 63 | 4.50% | 73 |
| Yuba | 44.63% | 6,307 | 47.71% | 6,742 | 1.80% | 254 | 2.55% | 360 | 3.31% | 468 |
| Ventura | 44.47% | 95,571 | 48.54% | 104,321 | 2.22% | 4,775 | 2.36% | 5,071 | 2.42% | 5,188 |
| Placer | 44.40% | 33,626 | 49.52% | 37,509 | 0.95% | 719 | 2.85% | 2,160 | 2.28% | 1,728 |
| Alpine | 44.39% | 289 | 43.63% | 284 | 2.76% | 18 | 4.92% | 32 | 4.30% | 28 |
| Tehama | 44.32% | 8,186 | 48.34% | 8,927 | 1.02% | 188 | 2.96% | 546 | 3.37% | 622 |
| San Diego | 43.92% | 320,867 | 49.05% | 358,361 | 1.95% | 14,263 | 2.52% | 18,402 | 2.57% | 18,722 |
| Tulare | 43.83% | 33,970 | 49.53% | 38,381 | 3.11% | 2,407 | 1.50% | 1,159 | 2.04% | 1,581 |
| El Dorado | 43.40% | 23,514 | 49.84% | 27,005 | 0.95% | 515 | 3.10% | 1,677 | 2.71% | 1,473 |
| Nevada | 42.80% | 16,067 | 49.31% | 18,508 | 0.97% | 365 | 2.63% | 987 | 4.29% | 1,610 |
| Mono | 41.26% | 1,419 | 50.89% | 1,750 | 1.08% | 37 | 3.49% | 120 | 3.29% | 113 |
| Shasta | 41.23% | 22,265 | 51.68% | 27,907 | 1.15% | 623 | 2.57% | 1,388 | 3.37% | 1,818 |
| Kern | 41.09% | 61,813 | 51.38% | 77,284 | 2.62% | 3,946 | 2.31% | 3,470 | 2.61% | 3,918 |
| Inyo | 40.96% | 2,940 | 52.77% | 3,788 | 1.20% | 86 | 2.24% | 161 | 2.83% | 203 |
| Modoc | 40.70% | 1,564 | 49.05% | 1,885 | 1.41% | 54 | 3.93% | 151 | 4.92% | 189 |
| Glenn | 40.40% | 3,212 | 53.98% | 4,292 | 0.99% | 79 | 2.02% | 161 | 2.60% | 207 |
| Sutter | 40.17% | 8,848 | 54.77% | 12,065 | 1.46% | 321 | 1.73% | 380 | 1.88% | 414 |
| Orange | 39.08% | 291,750 | 54.12% | 404,028 | 1.82% | 13,616 | 2.68% | 20,038 | 2.29% | 17,088 |

== See also ==
- 1994 California elections
- State of California
- Lieutenant Governor of California
- List of lieutenant governors of California
