= Arlene Nelson =

American politician (1925–2017)

Member of the Nebraska Legislature from the 35th district
- In office January 9, 1985 – January 6, 1993
- Preceded by: Howard Peterson
- Succeeded by: Dan Fisher

Personal details
- Born: July 15, 1925 Doniphan, Nebraska
- Died: August 22, 2017 (aged 92) Grand Island, Nebraska
- Party: Democratic
- Spouse: Milford R. Nelson (m. 1946)
- Children: 2 (Donna, Dennis)
- Education: University of Nebraska–Lincoln
- Occupation: Sales manager, bookkeeper

Arlene B. Nelson (July 15, 1925 – August 22, 2017) was a Democratic politician from Nebraska who served as a member of the Nebraska Legislature from the 35th district from 1985 to 1993.

== Early career ==
Nelson was born in 1925 in Doniphan, Nebraska. She graduated from Trumbull High School, and worked as a sales manager for Morton Aircraft in Omaha from 1942 to 1946, and as a bookkeeper for the Twin Rivers Company in Grand Island from 1946 to 1953. From 1953 to 1982, she worked on her family farm, and in 1981 and 1982, was a delegate to the National Farmers Union conventions. From 1983 to 1984, Nelson worked as a program assistant for the U.S. Department of Agriculture's Agricultural Stabilization and Conservation Service.

== Nebraska Legislature ==
In 1984, Nelson announced that she would challenge State Senator Howard Peterson for re-election in the 35th district, which was based in Hall County. During the campaign, Nelson attacked Peterson for opposing the impeachment of state Attorney General Paul L. Douglas but abstaining on the impeachment resolution, arguing that Peterson was "playing politics." In the primary election, Nelson placed first over Peterson in a landslide, receiving 62 percent of the vote to his 38 percent, which observers suggested was because of Peterson's rhetoric during the impeachment debate and for seeing things "in absolutes" in the Senate. In the general election, Nelson defeated Peterson by a wide margin, winning 56–44 percent.

Nelson ran for re-election in 1988, and was challenged by Hall County Supervisor Gary Quandt. In the primary election, Nelson received 60 percent of the vote to Quandt's 40 percent. In the general election, she defeated Quandt in a landslide, winning 60–40 percent.

In 1992, Nelson ran for re-election to a third term. She was challenged by businessmen Bill Bremer and Dan Fisher. In the primary election, Nelson placed first, receiving 43 percent of the vote to Fisher's 32 percent and Bremer's 25 percent. Nelson and Fisher advanced to the general election, where Fisher defeated Nelson by a wide margin, winning 59 percent of the vote to her 41 percent.

== Death ==
Nelson died on August 22, 2017.
