= Senator Petersen =

Senator Petersen may refer to:

- Branden Petersen (born 1986), Minnesota State Senate
- Chap Petersen (born 1968), Virginia State Senate
- David Petersen (Arizona politician) (born 1950), Arizona State Senate
- Frank S. Petersen (1922–2011), California State Senate
- Janet Petersen (born 1970), Iowa State Senate
- Lyndell Petersen (born 1931), South Dakota State Senate
- Mike Petersen (politician) (born 1960), Kansas State Senate
- Warren Petersen (born 1976), Arizona State Senate

== See also ==
- Brittany Pettersen (born 1981), Colorado State Senate
- Senator Pederson (disambiguation)
- Senator Peterson (disambiguation)
