= William von Raab =

American attorney (1942–2019)

13th Commissioner of the United States Customs Service
- In office October 13, 1981 – July 31, 1989
- President: Ronald Reagan; George H. W. Bush
- Preceded by: Robert E. Chasen
- Succeeded by: Carol Boyd Hallett

Personal details
- Born: January 26, 1942 New Rochelle, New York
- Died: February 20, 2019 (aged 77) Charlottesville, Virginia
- Party: Republican (until 1999); Reform (after 1999)
- Spouse(s): Mary Lambert Baskett (div. 1979); Susan von Raab (div. 1997); Lucy S. Rhame
- Children: Nicholas Christian von Raab; Alexandra Lambert von Raab
- Education: Yale University (B.A.); University of Virginia (L.L.B)

William von Raab (January 26, 1942 – February 20, 2019) was an American attorney who served as Commissioner of the United States Customs Service from 1981 to 1989. Known as an anti-vice crusader that spearheaded Ronald Reagan's war on drugs and for his confrontational stance with the Mexican government, von Raab would later be a staunch ally of Pat Buchanan and played a major role in Buchanan securing the 2000 Reform Party nomination.

== Early life ==
William was born in New Rochelle, New York on January 26, 1942 but was raised in Roslyn. He received a Bachelor of Arts from Yale University in 1963 and a Bachelor of Law from the University of Virginia in 1966.

== Career ==
von Raab started his political career under the Nixon Administration working as the Director of the Cost of Living Council from 1972 to 1973. He was the Executive Assistant to the administrator of the Federal Energy Administration from 1973-1975. von Raab would briefly depart from politics to serve as the Vice President of Administration and Finance of New York University from 1977-1979. He returned to politics in 1981 moving full time to Alexandria when he was named the Commissioner of the United States Customs Service by Ronald Reagan.

=== Commissioner ===
von Raab made a name for himself as an anti-vice crusader, often clashing with other elements of the Customs Service due to their perceived lack of zeal. He specifically "hate[d] the State Department--think[ing] they’re too diplomatic" when it came to anti-drug and vice efforts. He transformed the Customs Service from routine checkers of cargo and luggage to a more policed and militarized organization to fight against drug and arms smuggling. In order to fund his war on vice von Raab slashed commercial operations in a number of ports, namely those of Los Angeles and Long Beach, having computer systems installed to reduce the number of works and therefore costs. William often went to great lengths to fight what he viewed as "dithering" officials, earning him the reputation of a tyrant and the nickname "Little Caeser" also in part due to his small 5'-2" frame. In 1986 a U.S. prosecutor refused to cooperate in a von Raab led crackdown on pornography being smuggled into the country from Scandinavia to the port of New York, in response, he used his authority as Commissioner to redirect all Scandinavian mail through a port in North Carolina with a sympathetic prosecutor. His effort would be undone by the United States Postal Service who threatened to sue von Raab for criminal action for slowing the mail.

von Raab was also noted due to his confrontational stance with the Mexican government which he viewed as corrupt. After just a few months in office he visited the Chief of Police of Mexico City, Arturo Durazo on the advice of the United States Embassy to Mexico to improve working relations with law enforcement between both countries, however, von Raab was affronted by the luxury that Durazo lived in, owning a vast estate with swimming pools, tennis courts, a helicopter and helipad, and a complete discotheque with in-house disk jockey, all of which was supposedly solely paid for by a policeman's salary. When he returned to Washington D.C. he learned that Durazo was infamously well known for extorting millions of dollars from Mexican Government officials. Due to his visit to Durazo being on the advice of the State Department, this permanently soured his relation with them. On May 13, 1986 he accused the Governor of Sonora, Rodolfo Félix Valdés, of being directly involved in the production of marijuana and opium, which forced the U.S. government to issue a formal apology to the Mexican government. Just a few weeks earlier he testified to Congress that his lack of progress in stemming the flow of drugs across the border was due to "in my personal opinion, the ingrained corruption in the Mexican law enforcement establishment."

von Raab had survived the transition into the George H. W. Bush administration, however, quit on July 31, 1989 issuing blistering statements on both the United States Attorney General Dick Thornburgh and United States Treasury Secretary Nicholas F. Brady for, as he viewed it, failing to wage a truly tough war on drugs. In his resignation letter to Bush he charged that "political jockeying, backstabbing and malaise" where undermining anti-drug efforts which was rejected by Brady who said that von Raab had no authority to give his resignation letter to the President, considering that the Commissioner worked for the Treasury Secretary. In response von Raab stated that Brady was "actively discouraging" combating drugs in the country and other policies that von Raab championed such as bounties on drug lords.

=== Buchanan loyalist ===
Following his vocal departure from the Bush administration von Raab found himself in the camp of like minded insurgent Paleoconservative Republicans that supported Pat Buchanan as a more right-winged and ideologically driven alternative to the moderate Bush. von Raab was the chairman of Buchanan's short lived 1992 presidential campaign where he attempted to challenge Bush's renomination effort. Though Buchanan won no contests, Bush conceded on a number of issues and added parts of Buchanan's campaign into his own platform, including removing any mention of abortion from the platform altogether, which upset a sizable contingent of the Republican base as the party had been historically pro-choice. In response to this de-platforming of abortion issues von Raab, on behalf of the Buchanan camp, gave a statement that “I think you can count on our people giving the President their full support.” Bush would go on to lose the 1992 election to Bill Clinton with Bush's abortion platform being a key reason given as to why many Republican voters voted Democrat.

Although von Raab did not participate in Buchanan's 1996 campaign, instead returning to his legal career focusing on trade law for Ikon Holdings at the personal request of Roger Stone. However, Stone was able to convince von Raab to get back into politics to help Buchanan's 2000 campaign tasking von Raab with going to the Reform Party convention to see if there was any support their for Buchanan to run. William left the Republican Party and joined the Reform Party, seeking to tie Buchanan to the conservative pro-life and anti-gay rights wing of the party led by Russ Verney. He formally launched a "Draft Buchanan" movement within the party although at the time Buchanan was still running for the Republican nomination until he too would switch parties in October 1999. von Raab would lead efforts to discredit the progressive wing of the party, unofficially led by Jesse Ventura that sought to nominate Donald Trump for president, attacking Trump as "tacky" for naming his daughter Tiffany saying "he’d probably name a son Rolex." After Trump bowed out the progressive wing sought to draft Lowell P. Weicker as nominee, however, von Raab too worked to discredit him, handing out anti-Weicker fliers at the Reform Convention which ultimately nominated Buchanan.

== Later life ==
After leaving office William moved to a farm in Madison, and served on the boards of the Piedmont Environmental Council, Virginia Bar Association, Bar Association of the City of New York, The District of Columbia Bar Association, the Bar of the Supreme Court, the Brook Club, the Racquet and Tennis Club and White's. He died on February 20, 2019, in Charlottesville, Virginia at age 77. William's first wife Mary Lambert Baskett was a debutante from a prominent New York family whom he married on September 20, 1970. The couple had one daughter, Alexandra Lambert von Raab but where divorced by 1979. William divorced his second wife, Susan von Raab, in 1997, the couple had one son Nicholas Christian von Raab. At the time of his death was married to Lucy S. Rhame for 20 years.
