= The Brook (New York City) =

Social club in New York City

Coordinates: 40°45′34.5″N 73°58′17.5″W

The Brook is a private club located at 111 East 54th Street in Manhattan in New York City.

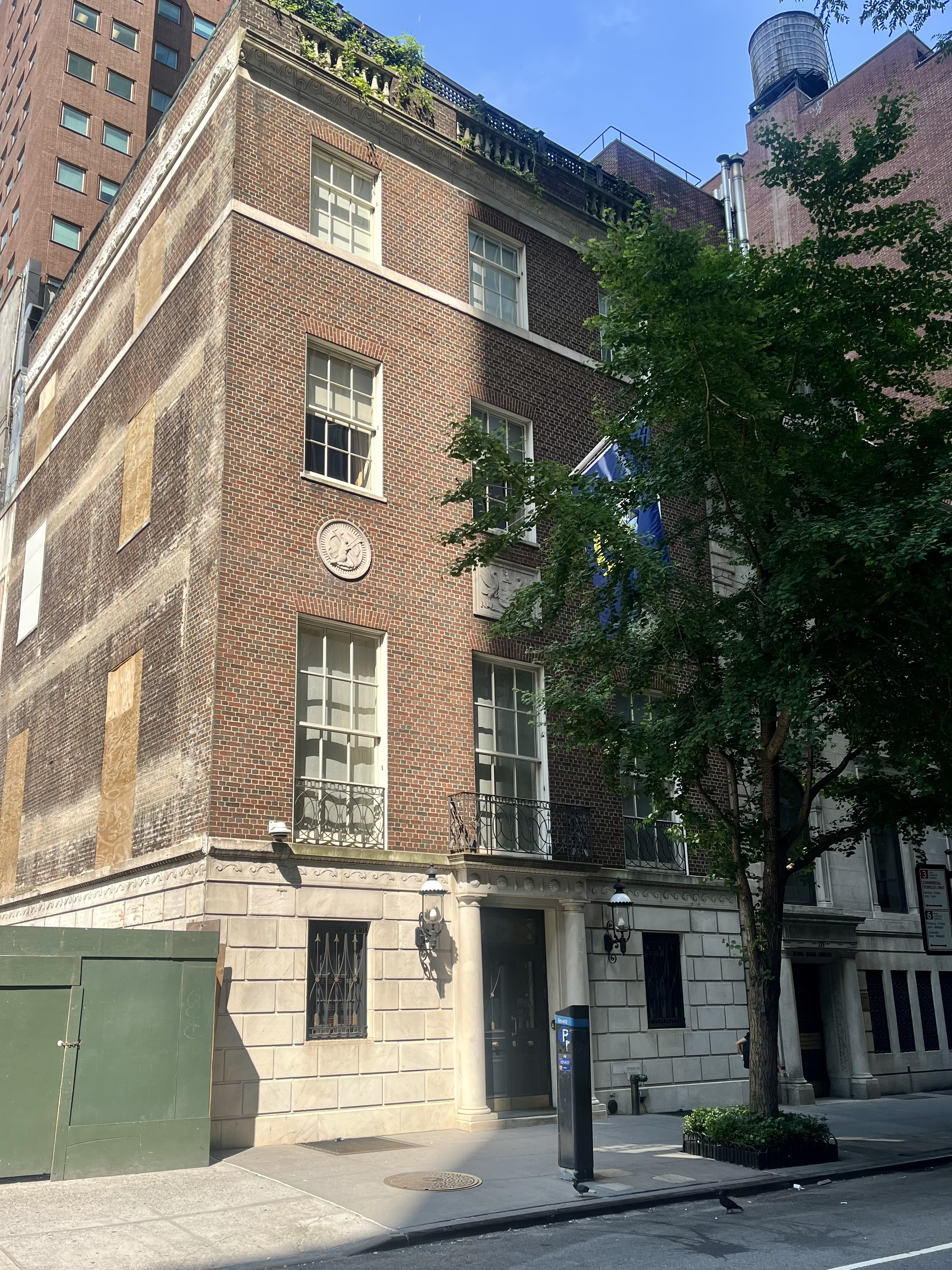
The 1925 clubhouse, designed by William Adams Delano

It was founded in 1903 by a group of prominent men who belonged to other New York City private clubs, such as the Knickerbocker Club, the Metropolitan Club (New York City) and the Union Club. The name is derived from the Alfred, Lord Tennyson poem The Brook, whose lines "For men may come and men may go, but I go on for ever" were consistent with the intention that the club would provide 24-hour service and would never close its doors. In 1992, the City Journal wrote that the name was "supposed to mean that the Club is always open and the conversation flows on forever," but that "neither is strictly true." One version of the club's origin holds that The Brook was formed by two young men who had been expelled from the Union Club for trying to poach an egg on the bald head of another club member.

When the club was formed, it was announced that membership was only by private invitation and would be limited to 100 men. New York City residents who were not club members would not be admitted as guests. Membership, however, was not restricted to New York City residents—some original members came from Boston, Chicago, and Philadelphia.

In 1954 the membership was 400 men. The club's building, erected in 1925, was designed by the architecture firm of Delano & Aldrich, which also designed the houses of the Union Club, the Knickerbocker, and other exclusive clubs.

== Notable members, past and present ==
- John Jacob Astor IV, richest man in America at the time – died in the Titanic
- Michael R. Bloomberg, resigned his membership before becoming a candidate for Mayor of New York before later becoming a member again in 2011.
- William A. Chanler, explorer, soldier and US Congressman
- Michel David-Weill, French investment banker and former Senior Partner of Lazard Frères
- Admiral James L. Holloway III
- Henry Kissinger, former Secretary of State
- Alejandro Santo Domingo, billionaire financier
- William K. Vanderbilt II
- William von Raab
- Jerauld Wright
- President John F. Kennedy

=== Other ===
- Fred Astaire, wore a Brook Club hatband in the 1953 film The Band Wagon
- John Hay Whitney, visited The Brook and was treated as a member, but he was never actually a member of the club.

== See also ==
- List of American gentlemen's clubs
