= Darin Peterson =

American politician (born 1966)

Darin G. Peterson

Member of the Utah Senate from the 24th district
- In office 2006–2008
- Preceded by: Leonard Blackham
- Succeeded by: Ralph Okerlund

Personal details
- Born: November 5, 1966 (age 59)
- Party: Republican Party
- Spouse: JoEllen
- Occupation: Farmer/Rancher

Darin Glen Peterson (born November 5, 1966) is an American politician from Utah. A Republican, he was a member of the Utah State Senate from 2006 until 2008, representing the state's 24th senate district in Juab, Piute, Sanpete, Sevier, Tooele, and Wayne Counties including the city of Nephi.

Peterson, the son of former Utah legislator Cary Peterson, is a graduate of Utah State University.
