= Dan Quick =

American politician

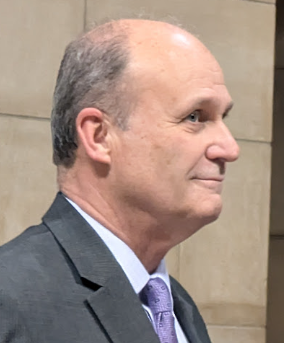

Member of the Nebraska Legislature from the 35th district
- Incumbent
- Assumed office January 8, 2025
- Preceded by: Ray Aguilar

Member of the Nebraska Legislature from the 35th district
- In office January 4, 2017 – January 6, 2021
- Preceded by: Mike Gloor
- Succeeded by: Ray Aguilar

Personal details
- Born: December 29, 1957 (age 68) Grand Island, Nebraska, U.S.
- Party: Democratic

Dan Quick (born December 29, 1957) is an American politician from Grand Island, Nebraska, who has served in the Nebraska Legislature representing the 35th district since 2025. He previously served in the Nebraska Legislature from 2017 to 2021.
