= 1988 United States Senate election in California =

- November 8, 1988
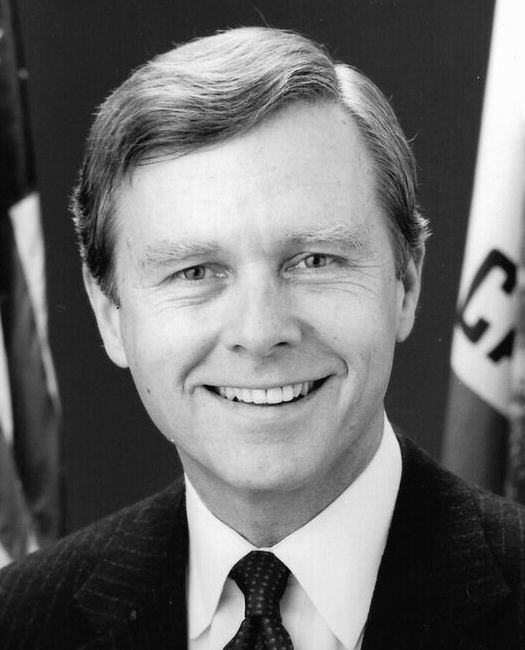

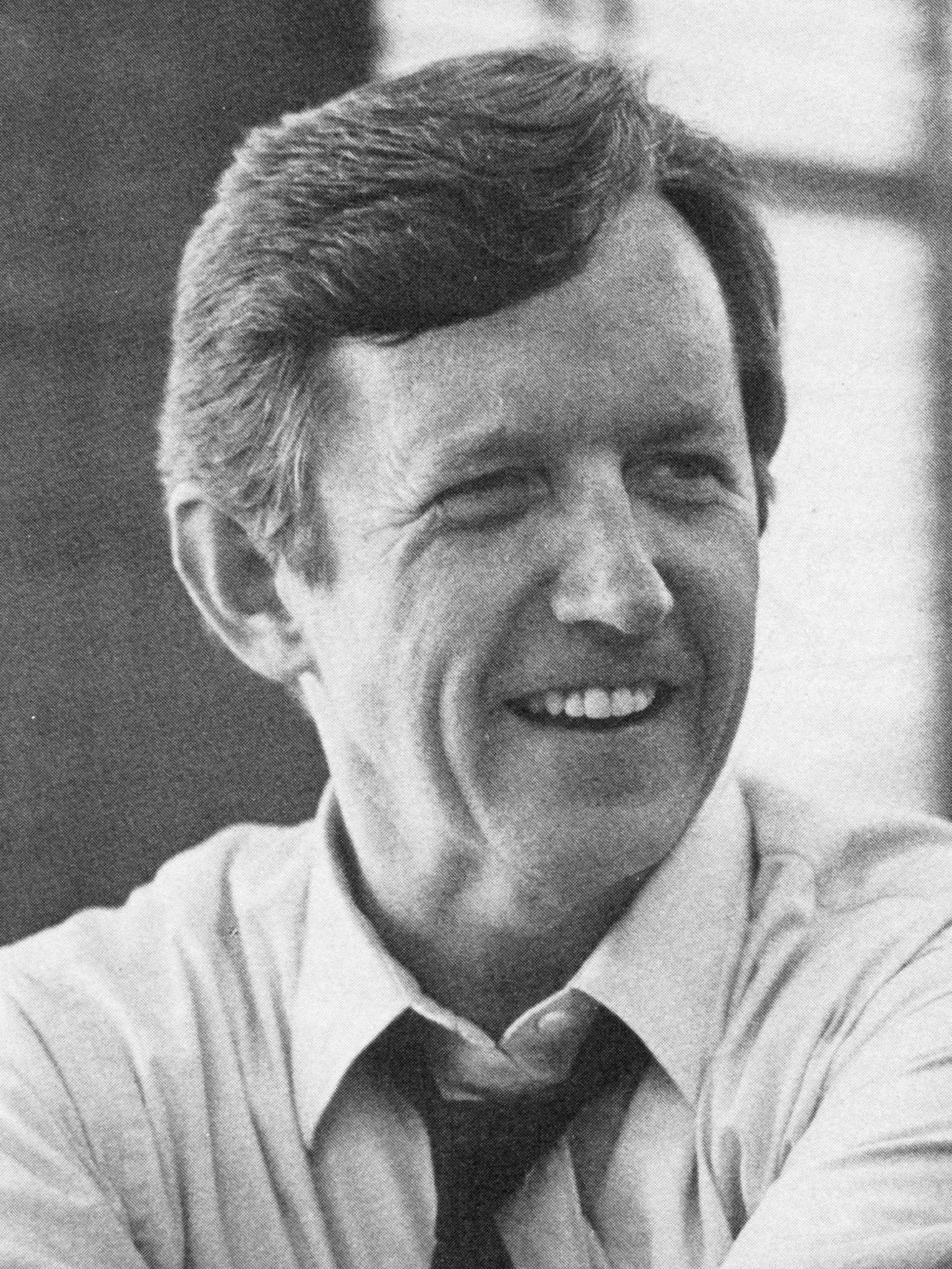
Nominee	Pete Wilson	Leo T. McCarthy
Party	Republican	Democratic
Popular vote	5,143,409	4,287,253
Percentage	52.79%	44.00%
- County results Wilson: 40–50% 50–60% 60–70% McCarthy: 40–50% 50–60% 60–70%
U.S. senator before election
Pete Wilson
Republican
Elected U.S. Senator
Pete Wilson
Republican

The 1988 United States Senate election in California took place on November 8, 1988. Incumbent Senator Pete Wilson won re-election to a second term.

As of 2026, this is the last time a Republican won a U.S. Senate election in California. This was also the first time since 1952 that an incumbent Senator was re-elected to this seat, and the last time until 2022 that a man would win a Senate election in California.

Wilson would resign less than two years into his second term to become Governor of California after being elected to the office in 1990.

== Democratic primary ==
=== Candidates ===
- John Hancock Abbott, perennial candidate
- Robert John Banuelos, candidate for Senate in 1986
- Charles Greene, candidate for Senate in 1986 and Los Angeles County Sheriff in 1982
- Leo T. McCarthy, Lieutenant Governor of California and former Speaker of the California State Assembly

=== Results ===
1988 Democratic Senate primary
Party	Candidate	Votes	%
Democratic	Leo T. McCarthy	2,367,067	81.69%
Democratic	John H. Abbott	220,331	7.60%
Democratic	Robert J. Banuelos	163,882	5.66%
Democratic	Charles Greene	146,307	5.05%
Total votes		2,897,587	100.0%

== Peace and Freedom primary ==
=== Candidates ===
- Gloria Garcia, nominee for California Secretary of State in 1986
- Maria Elizabeth Muñoz, Chicana activist and nominee for Governor in 1986

=== Results ===
1988 Peace and Freedom Senate primary
Party	Candidate	Votes	%
Peace and Freedom	Maria Elizabeth Muñoz	3,701	58.52%
Peace and Freedom	Gloria Garcia	2,623	41.48%
Total votes		6,324	100.0%

== General election ==
=== Candidates ===
- Joel Britton (Independent)
- Jack Dean (Libertarian)
- Leo T. McCarthy, Lieutenant Governor of California and former Speaker of the California State Assembly (Democratic)
- Maria Elizabeth Muñoz, Chicana activist and nominee for Governor in 1986 (Peace and Freedom)
- Merton D. Short (American Independent)
- Pete Wilson, incumbent Senator (Republican)

=== Results ===
1988 U.S. Senate election in California
Party	Candidate	Votes	%	±%
Republican	Pete Wilson (incumbent)	5,143,409	52.79%	▲1.25
Democratic	Leo T. McCarthy	4,287,253	44.00%	▼0.78
Peace and Freedom	Maria Elizabeth Muñoz	166,600	1.71%	▲0.47
Libertarian	Jack Dean	79,997	0.82%	▼0.51
American Independent	Merton D. Short	66,291	0.68%	▼0.39
Independent	Joel Britton	51	0.00%	N/A
Total votes		9,743,601	100.00%	
Republican hold		Swing		

==== Results by county ====
County	Pete Wilson Republican		Leo McCarthy Democratic		Maria Elizabeth Muñoz Peace & Freedom		Jack Dean Libertarian		All others	
County	#	%	#	%	#	%	#	%	#	%
Orange	68.23%	593,614	28.88%	251,264	1.48%	12,919	0.85%	7,418	0.55%	4,783
Inyo	65.37%	4,986	31.79%	2,425	1,28%	98	0.63%	48	0.92%	70
San Diego	64.06%	549,367	33.07%	283,554	1.34%	11,490	0.86%	7,343	0.68%	5,811
Mono	63.97%	2,397	31.49%	1,180	2.38%	89	1.12%	42	1.04%	39
Sutter	63.61%	12,724	32.33%	6,466	2.06%	413	1.17%	234	0.82%	165
Ventura	62.55%	149,958	34.14%	81,831	1.77%	4,235	0.84%	2,025	0.70%	1,678
Glenn	62.24%	5,006	34.40%	2,767	1.28%	103	0.81%	65	1.27%	102
Tulare	61.42%	46,958	35.29%	26,980	2.13%	1,630	0.63%	478	0.53%	408
Kern	60.77%	91,303	35.55%	53,415	2.09%	3,146	0.80%	1,202	0.79%	1,188
Modoc	60.72%	2,441	35.17%	1,414	1.47%	59	1.00%	40	1.67%	66
El Dorado	60.62%	30,738	35.47%	17,986	1.95%	990	0.96%	488	1.00%	507
Placer	60.41%	42,643	35.76%	25,243	1.97%	1,389	1.00%	709	0.85%	603
Shasta	60.38%	30,821	36.02%	18,384	1.37%	699	1.04%	532	1.19%	606
San Bernardino	59.44%	230,772	36.95%	143,465	1.90%	7,371	0.73%	2,821	0.99%	3,821
Nevada	59.10%	21,815	36.84%	13,598	2.10%	776	1.17%	433	0.78%	289
Riverside	58.60%	195,956	38.40%	128,422	1.73%	5,791	0.56%	1,866	0.71%	2,369
Colusa	58.69%	2,960	38.44%	1,942	1.66%	84	0.42%	21	0.89%	45
San Luis Obispo	58.13%	49,564	38.13%	32,452	1.80%	1,528	1.06%	904	0.77%	653
Tehama	57.64%	10,338	38.56%	6,916	1.23%	221	1,24%	222	1.32%	237
Yuba	57.53%	8,828	38.97%	5,980	1.74%	267	0.85%	131	0.91%	139
Madera	56.85%	13,324	38.90%	9,117	2.47%	580	0.84%	196	0.94%	220
Santa Barbara	56.85%	81,282	39.81%	56,916	1.99%	2,850	0.83%	1,187	0.52%	750
Calaveras	56.65%	7,584	39.81%	5,310	1.44%	193	1.13%	151	1.12%	150
Kings	56.33%	12,238	40.19%	8,737	2.10%	456	0.63%	136	0.76%	165
Mariposa	56.33%	3,895	39.65%	2,742	1.62%	112	1.08%	75	1.32%	91
Amador	56.23%	6,896	40.02%	4,912	1.61%	197	0.97%	119	1.15%	141
Alpine	56.14%	311	35.02%	194	5.05%	28	1.26%	7	2.53%	14
Tuolumne	55.80%	10,781	40.85%	7,892	1.65%	319	0.81%	156	0.90%	173
Butte	55.59%	40,056	40.09%	28,886	1.77%	1,272	1.26%	909	1.29%	933
San Joaquin	55.30%	75,753	41.12%	56,330	1.93%	2,650	0.61%	840	1.03%	1,416
Lassen	54.96%	4,780	40.71%	3,541	1.93%	168	0.94%	82	1.46%	127
Trinity	54.01%	3,337	39.80%	2,459	2.06%	127	1.96%	121	2.17%	134
Stanislaus	53.28%	51,423	43.97%	42,440	1.53%	1,476	0.57%	554	0.65%	623
Fresno	53.00%	99,315	43-62%	81,733	1.97%	3,696	0.71%	1,336	0.69%	1,291
Siskiyou	52.84%	9,448	42.38%	7,577	1.78%	319	1.30%	232	1.70%	304
Imperial	52.36%	12,391	42.67%	10,099	3.47%	822	0.77%	182	0.73%	173
Plumas	52.13%	4,635	43.60%	3,877	2.10%	187	1.12%	100	1.05%	93
Merced	52.04%	20,513	43.75%	17,247	2.32%	913	0.82%	325	1.07%	421
Sacramento	51.85%	201,827	44.47%	173,110	1.93%	7,496	0.76%	2,960	1.00%	3,885
Napa	51.83%	24,071	44.40%	20,619	1.82%	843	1.12%	519	0.84%	392
San Benito	51.82%	5,331	43.73%	4,499	2.54%	261	0.92%	95	0.99%	102
Contra Costa	51.10%	168,760	46.24%	152,714	1.29%	4,549	0.77%	2,549	0.60%	1,991
Sierra	51.04%	880	44.05%	759	2.69%	46	0.81%	14	1.39%	24
Monterey	49.83%	50,136	46.11%	46,401	2.33%	2,340	1.01%	1,012	0.73%	732
Lake	48.86%	9,516	47.28%	9,210	1.64%	320	1.24%	241	0.98%	191
Los Angeles	48.61%	1,265,582	48.46%	1,261,449	1.74%	45,427	0.67%	17,458	0.51%	13,375
Solano	48.22%	47,288	48.36%	47,420	1.57%	1,536	0.97%	955	0.88%	860
Santa Clara	47.69%	253,865	48.36%	257,463	1.96%	10,436	1.26%	6,734	0.73%	3,867
San Mateo	45.21%	111,187	51.12%	125,724	1.49%	3,659	0.98%	2,408	1.19%	2,940
Del Norte	45.08%	3,418	50.95%	3,863	1.74%	132	0.71%	54	1.52%	115
Sonoma	44.95%	71,775	51.19%	81,747	1.99%	3,185	1.05%	1,677	0.82%	1,304
Yolo	44.51%	23,459	51.78%	27,291	2.15%	1,133	0.87%	456	0.70%	370
Mendocino	43.71%	13,318	51.97%	15,835	2.10%	640	1.26%	385	0.96%	292
Marin	43.02%	49,942	54.35%	63,101	1.11%	1,288	1.06%	1,232	0.46%	536
Santa Cruz	38.16%	39,104	57.30%	58,715	2.60%	2,666	1.28%	1,307	0.65%	669
Humboldt	37.70%	19,384	59.27%	30,472	1.56%	804	0.73%	376	0.73%	375
Alameda	36.81%	173,204	60.22%	283,548	1.56%	7,327	0.85%	4,017	0.56%	2,656
San Francisco	28.70%	70,102	68.83%	167,613	1.29%	3,153	0.75%	1818	0.34%	841

Counties that flipped from Republican to Democratic

- Humboldt
- Sonoma
- Mendocino
- San Mateo
- Santa Clara
- Solano
- Marin
- Del Norte

Counties that flipped from Democratic to Republican

- Los Angeles

== See also ==
- 1988 United States Senate elections
