= Mike Gloor =

American politician

Member of the Nebraska Legislature from the 35th district
- In office 2009–2017
- Preceded by: Ray Aguilar
- Succeeded by: Dan Quick

Personal details
- Born: November 27, 1950 (age 75) Alliance, Nebraska
- Party: Republican

Mike Gloor (born November 27, 1950, in Alliance, Nebraska) is a politician from the U.S. state of Nebraska. A resident of Grand Island, he occupied a seat in the Nebraska Legislature from 2009 to 2017. He was succeeded in the Legislature by Dan Quick, a Democrat from Grand Island.

Gloor was elected in 2008 to represent the 35th Nebraska legislative district. Former CEO of St. Francis Medical Center, he raised over $120,000 in his 2008 bid, double the typical amount raised. He held seats on the banking, commerce, and insurance committees, and served as the chairman of the revenue committee.
