= Cary Peterson =

American politician (born 1935)

Cary G. Peterson

Member of the Utah Senate from the 28th district
- In office 1981–1992

Member of the Utah House of Representatives
- In office 1973–1980

Personal details
- Born: February 10, 1935 (age 91) Cedar Fort, Utah, United States
- Party: Republican
- Relations: Darin Peterson (son)
- Profession: farmer

Cary G. Peterson (born February 10, 1935), was an American politician who was a Republican member of the Utah House of Representatives and Utah State Senate. He also served as Utah Commissioner of Agriculture from 1993 to 2005.
