= Dan Fisher (Nebraska politician) =

American politician (1935–2004)

Member of the Nebraska Legislature from the 35th district
- In office January 6, 1993 – January 8, 1997
- Preceded by: Arlene Nelson
- Succeeded by: Chris Peterson

Personal details
- Born: May 19, 1935 Tobias, Nebraska
- Died: July 24, 2004 (aged 69) Lincoln, Nebraska
- Party: Republican
- Spouse: Alice Jennings (m. 1959)
- Children: 3 (Dan Jennings, Mary Catherine, Amy Susan)
- Education: University of Nebraska (B.A.); Kearney State College (M.B.A.)
- Occupation: Banker

Military service
- Allegiance: United States
- Branch/service: United States Marine Corps
- Years of service: 1958–1962

Dan Fisher (May 19, 1935 – July 24, 2004) was a Republican politician from Nebraska who served as a member of the Nebraska Legislature from the 35th district from 1993 to 1997.

== Early career ==
Fisher was born in 1935 in Tobias, Nebraska. He attended the University of Nebraska, graduating with his bachelor's degree in economics in 1963. Fisher worked as a banker, becoming the president and chief executive officer of the Crawford State Bank, and then relocated to Grand Island in 1982 to establish a consulting business. He later returned to school, graduating with his masters in business administration from Kearney State College in 1990.

== Nebraska Legislature ==
In 1992, Fisher ran for the state legislature in the 35th district, which was based in Hall County, against incumbent Democratic State Senator Arlene Nelson. In the primary election, Nelson placed first, winning 43 percent of the vote to Fisher's 32 percent and businessman Bill Bremer's 25 percent. In the general election, Fisher defeated Nelson in a landslide, receiving 59 percent of the vote to her 41 percent.

Fisher ran for a second term in 1996, and was challenged by Chris Peterson, the vice-chairwoman of the Nebraska Coordinating Commission for Postsecondary Education, and Barney McGahan, a member of the Grand Island City Council and former member of the Hall County Board of Supervisors. In the primary election, Fisher narrowly placed first, receiving 45 percent of the vote to Peterson's 42 percent and McGahan's 13 percent, and advanced to the general election against Peterson. Peterson defeated Fisher by a wide margin in the general election, receiving 63 percent of the vote to his 37 percent.

== Post-legislative career ==
Fisher ran for the Hall County Airport Authority in 1998. He was unopposed in the primary and general elections, and won uncontested. Fisher resigned from the board in 2000, following his move to Texas.

== Death ==
Fisher died on July 24, 2004.
