= Don Elrod =

American politician (1925–2009)

Member of the Nebraska Legislature from the 35th district
- In office April 20, 1966 – January 3, 1973
- Preceded by: Ira Paine
- Succeeded by: Ralph Kelly

Personal details
- Born: May 8, 1925 Loup City, Nebraska
- Died: January 27, 2009 (aged 83) Grand Island, Nebraska
- Party: Democratic
- Spouse(s): Helen Dorothy Niemoth (m. 1947, divorced) Stephanie Evans (m. 1983, divorced)
- Children: 4 (Mary Jo, James Alan, Dale Donald, Ashley Jane)
- Occupation: Advertising, newspaperman, financial services

Military service
- Allegiance: United States
- Branch/service: United States Navy
- Unit: Seabees

Arthur Donald "Don" Elrod (May 8, 1925 – January 27, 2009) was a Democratic politician from Nebraska who served as a member of the Nebraska Legislature from the 35th district from 1966 to 1973.

== Early life ==
Elrod was born in Loup City, Nebraska, in 1925. He attended Loup City high School, and subsequently took a correspondence course and completed an apprentice-printer training program. In World War II, Elrod served in the U.S. Navy in the Seabees from 1943 to 1946. Elrod worked for the Grand Island Independent as a printer, and served as the president of the Grand Island Typographical Union 731 and as the chairman of the Hall County Democratic Party.

== Nebraska Legislature ==
In 1964, Elrod ran for the state legislature from the 35th district, which was based in Hall County and included Grand Island. In the nonpartisan primary, he faced attorney George Burr, businessman Ira Paine, former County Sheriff Stan Stobbe, and former State Senator Walter J. Williams. Elrod placed second in the primary, winning 28 percent of the vote to Paine's 38 percent, and advanced to the general election. Elrod narrowly lost, receiving 48 percent of the vote to Paine's 52 percent.

In 1966, Elrod announced that he would run for the Hall County Board of Supervisors, but on March 8, 1966, Paine died in office. Elrod subsequently dropped his campaign for the county board, and announced that he would run for the legislature instead. Governor Frank B. Morrison subsequently appointed Elrod to serve until a special election could be held later that year, and he was sworn in on April 20, 1966.

Elrod faced Republican Arch Jarrell, the former managing editor of the Grand Island Independent, in the special election. Jarrell placed first in the primary, receiving 54 percent of the vote to Elrod's 46 percent. The general election was considered to be a "tightly contested race," and Elrod narrowly defeated Jarrell, winning 52–48 percent.

In 1968, Elrod ran for a full term in the legislature, and was challenged by Grand Island independent reporter Robert Krall. Elrod placed first in the primary, winning 59 percent to Krall's 41 percent, and won re-election in the general election by a wide margin, receiving 60 percent of the vote.

Kelly sought a second full term in 1972, and was challenged by businessman Ralph Kelly and former County Supervisor George Clayton. In the primary election, Elrod narrowly placed first, receiving 38 percent of the vote to Kelly's 37 percent and Elrod's 25 percent. He advanced to the general election with Kelly, and lost, receiving 45 percent of the vote to Kelly's 55 percent.

== Death ==
Elrod died on January 27, 2009.
