= Howard Peterson =

American politician (1914–2003)

Member of the Nebraska Legislature from the 35th district
- In office January 7, 1981 – January 9, 1985
- Preceded by: Ralph Kelly
- Succeeded by: Arlene Nelson

Personal details
- Born: March 22, 1914 Stanton, Iowa
- Died: November 19, 2003 (aged 89) Grand Island, Nebraska
- Party: Republican
- Spouse: Jeanne Backlund (m. 1939)
- Children: 4 (Richard, Roger, Ronald, Robert)
- Education: Luther College; University of Nebraska
- Occupation: Loan officer

Howard L. Peterson (March 22, 1914 – November 19, 2003) was a Republican politician from Nebraska who served as a member of the Nebraska Legislature from the 35th district from 1981 to 1985 and as the Mayor of Grand Island from 1964 to 1968.

== Early life ==
Peterson was born in Stanton, Iowa, in 1914. He graduated from Luther College, in Wahoo, Nebraska, and later attended the University of Nebraska for graduate coursework. Peterson owned a fertilizer business and served as Mayor of Grand Island from 1964 to 1968. From 1976 to 1977, he served as the chairman of the Great Plains Power Project, an unsuccessful. community effort to build a regional power plant.

== Nebraska Legislature ==
In 1980, Peterson announced that he would run for the state legislature to succeed State Senator Ralph Kelly in the 35th district, which was based in Hall County. In the nonpartisan primary, he faced businessman Kenny Gray and attorney Glen Murray. Peterson placed first in the primary by a wide margin, winning 58 percent of the vote to Gray's 24 percent and Murray's 18 percent. He and Gray advanced to the general election, but on September 24, 1980, Gray announced that he was suspending his campaign, citing his wife's pregnancy. Peterson subsequently defeated Gray in a landslide, winning 77–23 percent.

Peterson ran for re-election in 1984. He was challenged by Arlene Nelson, a farmer and former program assistant for the U.S. Department of Agriculture's Agricultural Stabilization and Conservation Service. Nelson criticized Peterson for abstaining on the impeachment vote for Attorney General Paul L. Douglas, which she argued was "playing politics." Nelson placed first over Peterson in the primary election, winning 62 percent of the vote to his 38 percent. In the general election, Peterson lost to Nelson, receiving 44 percent of the vote to her 56 percent.

== Death ==
Peterson died on November 19, 2003.
