= Ira Paine =

American politician (1890–1966)

Member of the Nebraska Legislature from the 35th district
- In office January 5, 1965 – March 8, 1966
- Preceded by: Ted Reeves
- Succeeded by: Don Elrod

Personal details
- Born: November 17, 1890 Cairo, Nebraska
- Died: March 8, 1966 (aged 75) Grand Island, Nebraska
- Party: Republican
- Spouse: Alice Hart (m. 1916)
- Children: Elnora
- Relatives: Bayard H. Paine (cousin)
- Education: Lackawanna Business College
- Occupation: Businessman

Ira E. Paine (November 17, 1890 – March 8, 1966) was a Republican politician from Nebraska who served as a member of the Nebraska Legislature from the 35th district from 1965 until his death in 1966.

== Early life ==
Paine was born in Cairo, Nebraska, in 1890, and grew up in Dalton, Pennsylvania. He attended Lackawanna Business College, and upon returning to Nebraska, worked for his family's company, the Paine Monument Company. He and his brother, H. B. Paine, purchased the store from their uncle and became owners of the company. Paine served as president of the company from 1932 until 1964, when it was sold.

== Nebraska Legislature ==
In 1964, Paine announced that he would run for the legislature in the 35th district, which was based entirely in Hall County following redistricting. In the nonpartisan primary, he faced George Burr, an attorney; Don Elrod, a printer for the Grand Island Independent; Sam Stobbe, the former Hall County Sheriff; and former State Senator Walter J. Williams.

Paine placed first in the primary, winning 38 percent of the vote to Elrod's 28 percent, and they advanced to the general election. Though the race was formally nonpartisan, Paine was a Republican and Elrod was a Democrat. Paine narrowly defeated Elrod, winning 52–48 percent.

On March 8, 1966, Paine died several days after suffering a heart attack.
