= Leo T. McCarthy =

American politician (1930–2007)

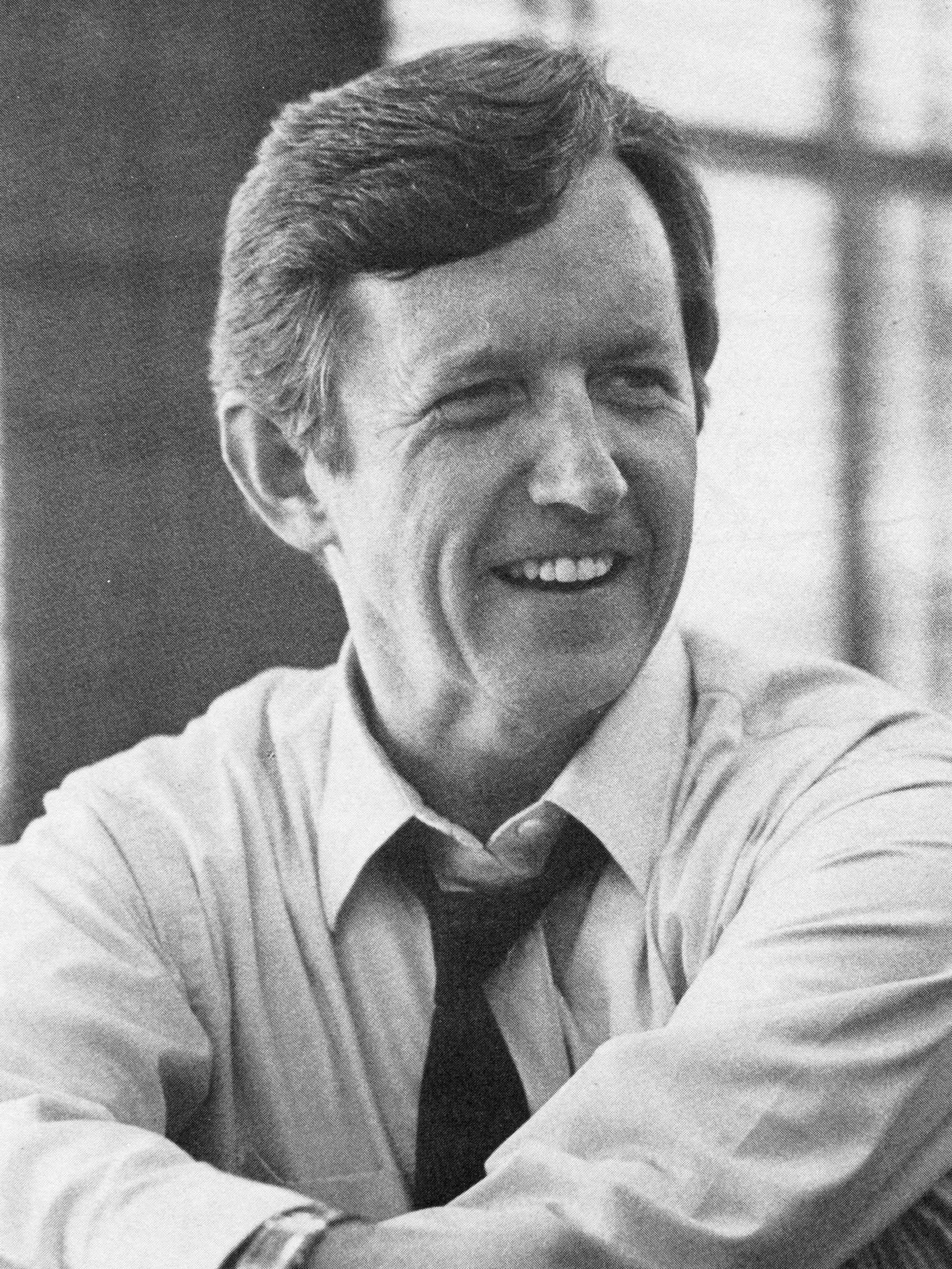
- McCarthy in 1982

43rd Lieutenant Governor of California
- In office January 3, 1983 – January 2, 1995
- Governor: George Deukmejian; Pete Wilson
- Preceded by: Mike Curb
- Succeeded by: Gray Davis

57th Speaker of the California State Assembly
- In office June 5, 1974 – November 30, 1980
- Preceded by: Bob Moretti
- Succeeded by: Willie Brown

Member of the California State Assembly
- In office January 6, 1969 – November 30, 1982
- Preceded by: Charlie Meyers
- Succeeded by: Alister McAlister
- Constituency: 19th district (1969–1974); 18th district (1974–1982)

Member of the San Francisco Board of Supervisors from the at-large district
- In office January 8, 1964 – January 6, 1969
- Preceded by: Harold Dobbs
- Succeeded by: Robert E. Gonzales

Personal details
- Born: Leo Tarcissus McCarthy; August 15, 1930 Auckland, New Zealand
- Died: February 5, 2007 (aged 76) San Francisco, California, U.S.
- Resting place: Holy Cross Cemetery, Colma, California
- Party: Democratic
- Spouse: Jacqueline Lee Burke
- Children: 4
- Education: University of San Francisco (BA); San Francisco Law School (JD)
- Profession: Politician, lawyer

Military service
- Allegiance: United States
- Branch/service: United States Air Force
- Years of service: 1951–1952

Leo Tarcissus McCarthy (August 15, 1930 – February 5, 2007) was an American politician and businessman. He served as the 43rd lieutenant governor of California from 1983 to 1995.

== Early life and education ==
McCarthy, whose parents were both natives of Tralee, Ireland, was himself born in Auckland, New Zealand, on August 15, 1930 but emigrated to the United States with his parents Daniel and Nora McCarthy, and siblings when he was three years old. The McCarthy family sailed from the Port of Wellington, New Zealand on the Union Steam Ship Makura, which arrived at the Port of San Francisco, California, on February 9, 1934. He went to elementary school at Mission Dolores. He then went to high school at St. Ignatius College Preparatory. He earned a Bachelor of Arts degree in history from the University of San Francisco and a Juris Doctor from San Francisco Law School.

== Career ==
McCarthy joined the United States Air Force in March 1951, and served for twenty-one months until the end of 1952, as an enlisted man. He was in an intelligence unit at the Strategic Air Command and was stationed at Lake Charles, Louisiana for seventeen months. While at the Strategic Air Command, he spent a few weeks deployed to Saudi Arabia taking part in a mission to simulate the start of World War III. He also served in the United States Air Force Reserves for a few years.

=== California Assembly ===
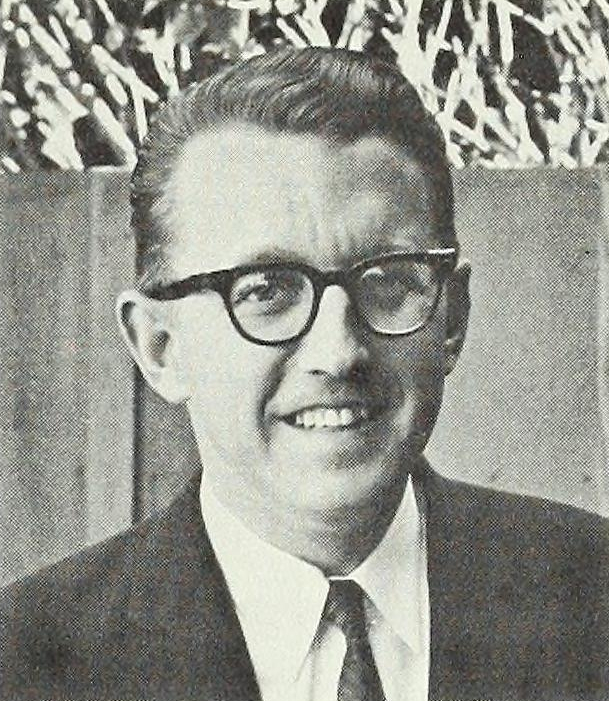
McCarthy c. 1965

In 1958, the year that saw the Democrats capture statewide offices for the first time since World War II, McCarthy managed the successful campaign for State Senate of J. Eugene McAteer. After the election, McCarthy served as McAteer's administrative assistant.

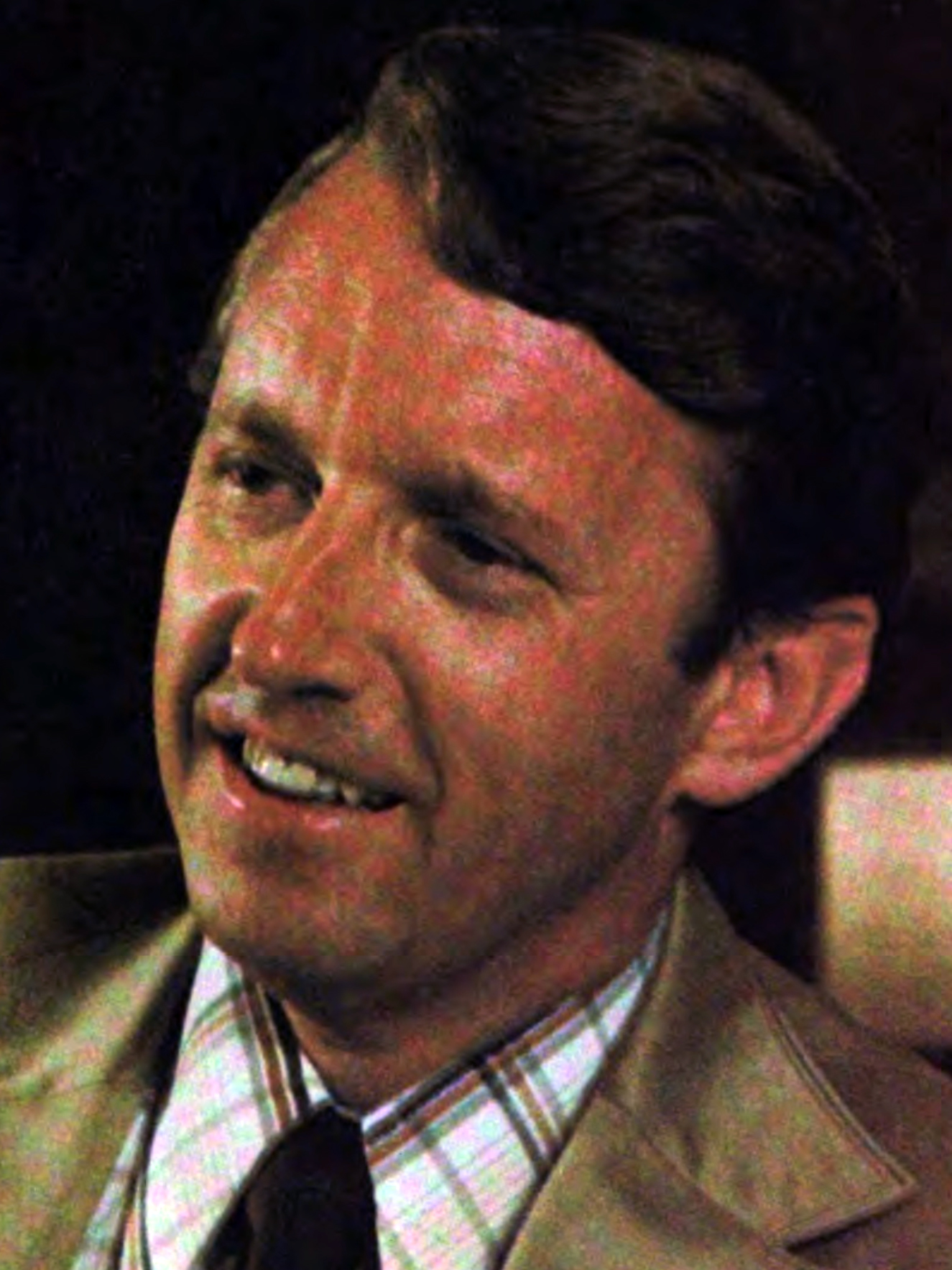
McCarthy as Speaker of the California State Assembly c. 1975

McCarthy first ran for office in 1963, when he was elected to the San Francisco Board of Supervisors. He served there until 1967. In 1968, he was elected to the State Assembly, serving as speaker of the Assembly from 1974 to 1980. (Art Agnos, elected mayor of San Francisco in 1988, had his political start as McCarthy's first legislative assistant, and later as the speaker's chief of staff.) As speaker, McCarthy earned a reputation as a partisan, take-no-prisoners insider in Democratic Party politics.

McCarthy unexpectedly lost the speakership to Willie Brown in 1980. McCarthy had been facing a stiff challenge from Howard Berman. Seeing his fellow Democrats so divided, Brown worked with Republicans to gain the speakership. Both of the losers in this struggle soon left the legislature. Berman ran for Congress and McCarthy ran for statewide office.

=== Lieutenant Governor of California (from 1983 to 1995) ===
McCarthy was first elected to statewide office to the first of three consecutive four-year terms as lieutenant governor of California in 1982, at the same time that Republican George Deukmejian was elected governor. In 1986, the incumbent McCarthy ran against Republican Mike Curb, the former Lieutenant Governor and McCarthy's immediate predecessor as well as a former film producer and music promoter with a reputation for opposing drug use by artists. In a hotly-contested race for lieutenant governor that centered largely around violent crime and drug policy, McCarthy alleged that Curb made a fortune in making 'exploitation films' that glorified drugs, sex, and violence. Curb was so incensed at the charges that he filed a $7-million libel and slander suit against McCarthy, who ultimately won the election.

After his failed 1988 Senate campaign, McCarthy won a third term as lieutenant governor in 1990, while his 1988 opponent Pete Wilson won the election for governor.

=== 1988 U.S. Senate campaign ===
In 1988, McCarthy ran for the U.S. Senate. He easily won the Democratic Party nomination but was defeated in the general election by the Republican incumbent and future Governor Pete Wilson. As of 2021, this was the last time a Republican won a U.S. Senate seat in California. McCarthy's 4,287,253 votes set a record for the most votes given to a losing Democratic Senate candidate that lasted until it was broken by MJ Hegar of Texas in 2020. McCarthy was the first person to get more than 4 million votes in a losing Senate campaign.

=== 1992 U.S. Senate campaign and retirement ===
In 1992, McCarthy entered the Democratic primary election for the U.S. Senate but lost the nomination to US Representative (and later general election winner) Barbara Boxer.

McCarthy retired from public office at the end of his third term as the state's longest-serving Lieutenant Governor after 12 years in office on January 2, 1995, choosing not to seek re-election to a fourth term in 1994, even though he was eligible for one more term and would not have been term-limited until 1998. He was succeeded by a fellow Democrat, then-State Controller and later future Governor Gray Davis. McCarthy's 12 years are the longest any California lieutenant governor has served. Upon leaving politics, he created an investment company, The Daniel Group, named for his father and located in San Francisco.

=== Leo T. McCarthy Center ===
He helped found the Leo T. McCarthy Center for Public Service and the Common Good at the University of San Francisco.

== Personal life and death ==
McCarthy was Catholic. He was married on December 17, 1955, to the former Jacqueline Lee Burke. They had four children (Sharon, Conna, Adam, and Niall) and eleven grandchildren.

After a long illness, McCarthy died from a kidney ailment at his home in San Francisco on February 5, 2007.

== Sources ==
- Online archive of California
- Leo T. McCarthy: 1930–2007
- Candidate Bio
- Leo T. McCarthy, Oral History Interview, California State Archives, 1995–1996
- New Zealand Immigration Archives

California Assembly
Preceded by Charles W. Meyers	California State Assemblyman, 19th District; 1969–1974	Succeeded by Lou Papan
Preceded by Willie Brown	California State Assemblyman, 18th District; 1974–1982	Succeeded by Alister McAlister
Political offices
Preceded by Bob Moretti	Speaker of the California State Assembly; June 1974 – November 1980	Succeeded by Willie Brown
Preceded by Mike Curb	Lieutenant Governor of California; January 3, 1983 – January 2, 1995	Succeeded by Gray Davis
Party political offices
Preceded by Jerry Brown	Democratic Party nominee for United States Senator (Class 1) from California; 1988	Succeeded by Dianne Feinstein
Preceded by Mervyn M. Dymally	Democratic Party nominee for Lieutenant Governor of California; 1982, 1986, 1990	Succeeded by Gray Davis
