= Ray Aguilar =

American politician

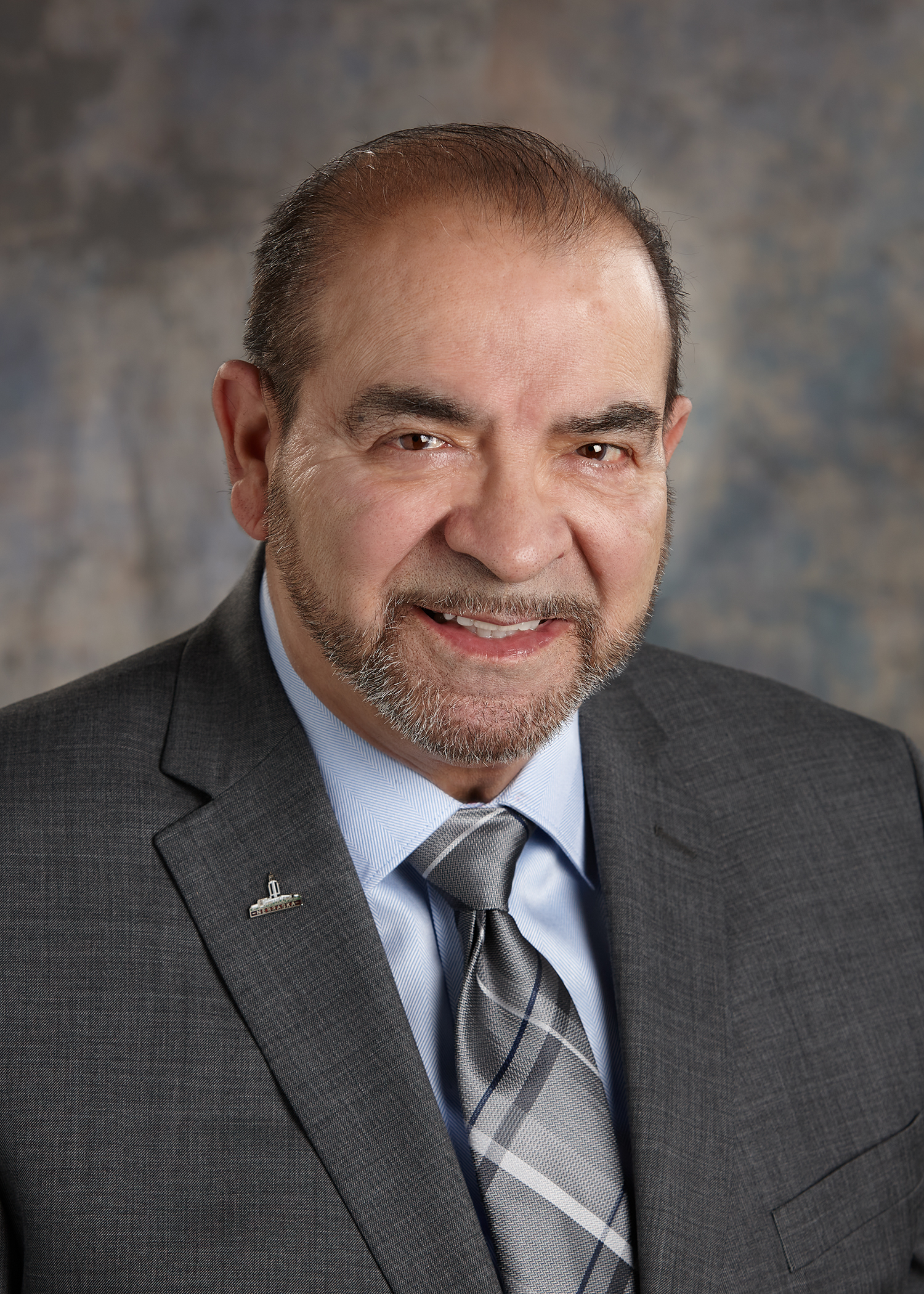

Chair of the Executive Board of the Nebraska Legislature
- In office November 1, 2023 – January 8, 2025; Acting: November 1, 2023 – January 3, 2024
- Preceded by: Tom Briese
- Succeeded by: Ben Hansen

Member of the Nebraska Legislature from the 35th district
- In office January 6, 2021 – January 8, 2025
- Preceded by: Dan Quick
- Succeeded by: Dan Quick
- In office June 9, 1999 – January 7, 2009
- Preceded by: Chris Peterson
- Succeeded by: Mike Gloor

Personal details
- Born: October 24, 1947 (age 79) Grand Island, Nebraska, U.S.
- Party: Republican
- Children: 9
- Education: Central Community College

Ray Aguilar (born October 24, 1947) is an American politician and businessman who served as a member of the Nebraska Legislature from the 35th district. His appointment in 1999 made him the first Latino in the legislature. In November 2020, Aguilar defeated incumbent senator Dan Quick to regain his seat in the legislature, but in 2024 he lost the seat once again to Dan Quick. Aguilar is a member of the Republican Party.

== Early life and education ==
Aguilar was born in Grand Island, Nebraska. He graduated from Grand Island Senior High School in 1965 and attended Central Community College.

== Career ==
Aguilar worked as building and grounds supervisor for Grand Island Central Catholic middle and high school. He later owned a janitorial service, which he operated at the time of his departure from the Nebraska legislature.

In 1996, mayor Ken Gnadt appointed Aguilar to the Grand Island city council to serve the five months remaining in the term of a councilman who had moved outside the city limits. In 1998, Aguilar ran for election to the same council seat; he was defeated by incumbent Bob Sorensen, who received 892 votes to Aguilar's 850.

In 1999, governor Mike Johanns appointed Aguilar to fill a vacancy in the Nebraska Legislature, created by the resignation of Chris Peterson. He was sworn in on June 9, 1999, and became the first Latino in the Legislature.

In 2000, Aguilar ran for election to the seat. In the nonpartisan primary, Aguilar, a Republican, ran against Democrat Lonnie Logan, a member of the Hall County Board of Supervisors, and Libertarian Larry Gibreal, a realtor. When the primary election was held, Aguilar received 4183 votes, or 62.2% of the total; Logan received 2200 votes, or 32.7%; and Gibreal received 342 votes, or 5.1%. As the top two vote-getters, Aguilar and Logan moved on to the general election, in which Aguilar won the seat with 8090 votes, or 73.1% of the total; Logan received 2946 votes, or 26.6%; and there were 31 write-in votes, constituting 0.3%.

In 2004, Aguilar ran unopposed for a second four-year term in the legislature. Under Nebraska's term-limits law, he was ineligible to run for a third consecutive term in 2008. He was succeeded in the Legislature by Mike Gloor, a Republican from Grand Island.

In 2020, Aguilar announced his candidacy to return to the Nebraska Legislature. With 12,295 votes counted in Hall County, Aguilar won the seat back from state senator Dan Quick with 53.4% of the vote, according to preliminary unofficial results.

== Personal life ==
He and his wife, Susan Ann Aguilar, have nine children.

Nebraska Legislature
Preceded by Tom Briese	Chair of the Executive Board of the Nebraska Legislature; 2023–2025; Acting: 2023–2024	Succeeded by Ben Hansen
