= Ralph Kelly =

American politician (1920–2005)

Member of the Nebraska Legislature from the 35th district
- In office January 3, 1973 – January 7, 1981
- Preceded by: Don Elrod
- Succeeded by: Howard Peterson

Personal details
- Born: December 6, 1920 Grand Island, Nebraska
- Died: December 25, 2005 (aged 85) Lincoln, Nebraska
- Party: Republican
- Spouse: Patricia Stone (m. 1941)
- Children: 3 (Michael, Erin, Michele)
- Education: University of Nebraska–Lincoln; Utah State College
- Occupation: Businessman

Ralph Kelly (December 6, 1920 – December 25, 2005) was a Republican politician from Nebraska who served as a member of the Nebraska Legislature from the 35th district from 1973 to 1981.

== Early life ==
Kelly was born in Grand Island, Nebraska, in 1920. He graduated from Grand Island Senior High School and later attended the University of Nebraska–Lincoln and Utah State College. Kelly served in World War II as a member of the United States Army Air Corps. Upon returning, he worked in Grand Island, and worked for the Kelly Supply Company, his family's plumbing supply business, with his brother.

== Nebraska Legislature ==
In 1972, State Senator Don Elrod ran for re-election in the 35th district, which was based in Hall County. Kelly, along with former County Supervisor George Clayton, ran against Elrod. Elrod narrowly placed first in the nonpartisan primary, winning 38 percent of the vote to Kelly's 37 percent and Elrod's 25 percent. They advanced to the general election, where Kelly ultimately defeated Elrod, winning 55–45 percent.

Kelly ran for re-election in 1976, and was challenged by former Hall County Register of Deeds Rose Ann Jacobsen. In the primary, Kelly placed first by a wide margin, receiving 72 percent of the vote to Jacobsen's 28 percent. In the general election, Kelly won re-election in a landslide, winning 73 percent of the vote.

In 1980, Kelly announced that he would not seek re-election to a third term, noting that he wanted "to move onto other activities."

== Death ==
Kelly died on December 25, 2005.
