= Chris Peterson (Nebraska politician) =

American politician (born 1950)

Member of the Nebraska Legislature from the 35th district
- In office January 8, 1997 – June 4, 1999
- Preceded by: Dan Fisher
- Succeeded by: Ray Aguilar

Personal details
- Born: October 18, 1950 (age 75) Ord, Nebraska
- Party: Republican
- Spouse: Ernie Peterson (m. 1974)
- Children: 2 (Anastacia, B.J.)
- Education: University of Nebraska–Lincoln (B.S.)
- Occupation: Health official, teacher

Chris Peterson (née Ferguson, born October 18, 1950) is a Republican politician from Nebraska who served as a member of the Nebraska Legislature from the 35th district from 1997 to 1999. She later served in the cabinets of Governors Mike Johanns and Dave Heineman as the policy secretary, and later CEO, of the Nebraska Department of Health and Human Services.

== Early career ==
Chris Ferguson was born in Ord, Nebraska, in 1950. She graduated from Ord High School in 1968, and later from the University of Nebraska–Lincoln in 1972 with a degree in education. She married Ernie Peterson in 1974, and taught in Grand Island Public Schools. Peterson served as a member of the Nebraska Coordinating Commission for Postsecondary Education.

== Nebraska Legislature ==
In 1996, Peterson, along with Grand Island City Councilman Barney McGahan, challenged incumbent State Senator Dan Fisher for re-election. Fisher narrowly placed first in the primary election, winning 45 percent of the vote to Peterson's 42 percent, and they advanced to the general election. Peterson defeated Fisher in a landslide, receiving 63 percent of the vote to his 37 percent.

== Nebraska Department of Health and Human Services ==
In 1999, Governor Mike Johanns appointed Peterson as the policy secretary for the Nebraska Department of Health and Human Services. Peterson took office following the conclusion of the legislative session in June because of a constitutional prohibition on legislators serving in the executive branch, and she resigned on June 4, 1999.

Governor Dave Heineman appointed Peterson as the chief executive officer of the Health and Human Services System in 2006, and she served until 2009.
