= Agricultural Stabilization and Conservation Service =

Former agency of the United States Department of Agriculture

- Seal of the U.S. Department of Agriculture

Agency overview
- Formed: 1961
- Dissolved: 1994
- Superseding agency: Farm Service Agency
- Jurisdiction: United States Department of Agriculture

The Agricultural Stabilization and Conservation Service (ASCS) was an agency of the United States Department of Agriculture. It administered programs concerning farm products and agricultural conservation. It granted loans to farmers; purchased farm products from farmers and processors; administered land allotment and marketing quota programs; shared the cost of resource conservation and environmental protection measures with farmers and ranchers; and supervised civil defense activities relating to food. It also managed the inventories of the Commodity Credit Corporation. The ASCS was established in 1961.

In 1994, the ASCS was merged with other Agriculture agencies to create the Farm Service Agency.
