= List of lieutenant governors of California =

Below is a list of lieutenant governors of the U.S. state of California, 1849 to present. In California, the Lieutenant Governor and the Governor do not run together on the same ticket. The Lieutenant Governor can therefore be affiliated with a different political party than that of the Governor. Per the 1879 California Constitution, the Lieutenant Governor is the President of the State Senate.

== List of lieutenant governors ==
Lieutenant governors of the State of California
No.	Lieutenant Governor	Term in office	Party	Election	Governor (Note: Lieutenant governors represented the same party as their governor unless noted.)
1	John McDougal (1818–1866)	December 20, 1849 (Note: A civilian government was formed in late 1849 prior to official statehood, and operated as the state government for ten months before official statehood was granted.) – January 9, 1851 (succeeded to governor)	Democratic	1849	Peter Hardeman Burnett (resigned January 9, 1851)
2	David C. Broderick (acting) (1820–1859)	January 9, 1851 – January 8, 1852 (did not run)	Democratic	Succeeded from president of the Senate	John McDougal
3	Samuel Purdy (1819–1882)	January 8, 1852 – January 9, 1856 (lost election)	Democratic	1851	John Bigler
3	Samuel Purdy (1819–1882)	January 8, 1852 – January 9, 1856 (lost election)	Democratic	1853	John Bigler
4	Robert M. Anderson (1824–1878)	January 9, 1856 – January 8, 1858 (did not run)	American	1855	J. Neely Johnson
5	Joseph Walkup (1819–1873)	January 8, 1858 – January 9, 1860 (did not run)	Democratic	1857	John B. Weller
6	John G. Downey (1827–1894)	January 9, 1860 – January 20, 1860 (succeeded to governor)	Democratic	1859	Milton Latham
7	Isaac N. Quinn (acting) (1795–1865)	January 20, 1860 – January 7, 1861 (presidency expired)	Democratic	Succeeded from president of the Senate	John G. Downey
8	Pablo de la Guerra (acting) (1819–1874)	January 7, 1861 – January 10, 1862 (did not run)	Democratic	Succeeded from president of the Senate	John G. Downey
9	John F. Chellis (1792–1883)	January 10, 1862 – December 10, 1863 (did not run)	Republican	1861	Leland Stanford
10	Tim N. Machin (1822–1905)	December 10, 1863 – December 5, 1867 (did not run)	Republican	1863	Frederick Low
11	William Holden (1824–1884)	December 5, 1867 – December 8, 1871 (did not run)	Democratic	1867	Henry Huntly Haight
12	Romualdo Pacheco (1831–1899)	December 8, 1871 – February 27, 1875 (succeeded to governor)	Republican	1871	Newton Booth
13	William Irwin (acting) (1827–1886)	February 27, 1875 – December 9, 1875 (elected governor)	Democratic	Succeeded from president of the Senate	Romualdo Pacheco (Note: Represented the Republican Party)
14	James A. Johnson (1829–1896)	December 9, 1875 – January 8, 1880 (did not run)	Democratic	1875	William Irwin
15	John Mansfield (1822–1896)	January 8, 1880 – January 10, 1883 (did not run)	Republican	1879	George C. Perkins
16	John Daggett (1833–1919)	January 10, 1883 – January 8, 1887 (did not run)	Democratic	1882	George Stoneman
17	Robert Waterman (1826–1891)	January 8, 1887 – September 13, 1887 (succeeded to governor)	Republican	1886	Washington Bartlett (Note: Represented the Democratic Party) (died September 12, 1887)
18	Stephen M. White (acting) (1853–1901)	September 13, 1887 – January 8, 1891 (did not run)	Democratic	Succeeded from president of the Senate	Robert Waterman
19	John B. Reddick (1845–1895)	January 8, 1891 – January 11, 1895 (did not run)	Republican	1890	Henry Markham
20	Spencer G. Millard (1856–1895)	January 11, 1895 – October 24, 1895 (died in office)	Republican	1894	James Budd
—	Office vacant from October 24 - 26, 1895		Office vacated by death		James Budd
21	William T. Jeter (1850–1930)	October 26, 1895 – January 3, 1899 (did not run)	Democratic	Appointed by governor	James Budd
22	Jacob H. Neff (1830–1909)	January 3, 1899 – January 6, 1903 (did not run)	Republican	1898	Henry T. Gage
23	Alden Anderson (1867–1944)	January 6, 1903 – January 8, 1907 (did not run)	Republican	1902	George Pardee
24	Warren R. Porter (1861–1927)	January 8, 1907 – January 3, 1911 (did not run)	Republican	1906	James Gillett
25	Albert Joseph Wallace (1853–1939)	January 3, 1911 – January 5, 1915 (did not run)	Republican	1910	Hiram Johnson (Note: Represented the Progressive Party starting from the 1914 election) (resigned March 15, 1917)
26	John Morton Eshleman (1876–1916)	January 5, 1915 – February 28, 1916 (died in office)	Progressive	1914	Hiram Johnson (resigned March 15, 1917)
—	Office vacant from February 28 - July 22, 1916		Office vacated by death		Hiram Johnson (resigned March 15, 1917)
27	William Stephens (1859–1944)	July 22, 1916 – March 15, 1917 (succeeded to governor)	Republican	Appointed by governor	Hiram Johnson (resigned March 15, 1917)
—	Office vacant from March 15, 1917 - January 6, 1919		Office vacated by succession to governor		William Stephens
28	C. C. Young (1869–1947)	January 7, 1919 – January 4, 1927 (elected governor)	Republican	1918	William Stephens
28	C. C. Young (1869–1947)	January 7, 1919 – January 4, 1927 (elected governor)	Republican	1922	Friend Richardson
29	Buron Fitts (1895–1973)	January 4, 1927 – November 30, 1928 (resigned) (Note: Fitts resigned to serve as a special prosecutor.)	Republican	1926	C. C. Young
—	Office vacant from November 30 - December 4, 1928		Office vacated by resignation		C. C. Young
30	Herschel L. Carnahan (1879–1941)	December 4, 1928 – January 6, 1931 (did not run)	Republican	Appointed by governor	C. C. Young
31	Frank Merriam (1865–1955)	January 5, 1931 – June 2, 1934 (succeeded to governor)	Republican	1930	James Rolph (died June 2, 1934)
—	Office vacant from June 2, 1934 - January 7, 1935		Office vacated by succession to governor		Frank Merriam
32	George J. Hatfield (1887–1953)	January 8, 1935 – January 2, 1939 (did not run) (Note: Hatfield instead ran unsuccessfully for the Republican nomination for governor.)	Republican	1934	Frank Merriam
33	Ellis E. Patterson (1897–1985)	January 2, 1939 – January 4, 1943 (lost election)	Democratic	1938	Culbert Olson
34	Frederick F. Houser (1904–1989)	January 4, 1943 – January 6, 1947 (did not run) (Note: Houser instead ran unsuccessfully for the United States Senate.)	Republican	1942	Earl Warren (resigned October 4, 1953)
35	Goodwin Knight (1896–1970)	January 6, 1947 – October 4, 1953 (succeeded to governor)	Republican	1946	Earl Warren (resigned October 4, 1953)
35	Goodwin Knight (1896–1970)	January 6, 1947 – October 4, 1953 (succeeded to governor)	Republican	1950	Earl Warren (resigned October 4, 1953)
36	Harold J. Powers (1900–1996)	October 5, 1953 – January 5, 1959 (lost election)	Republican	Succeeded from president of the Senate	Goodwin Knight
36	Harold J. Powers (1900–1996)	October 5, 1953 – January 5, 1959 (lost election)	Republican	1954	Goodwin Knight
37	Glenn M. Anderson (1913–1994)	January 5, 1959 – January 2, 1967 (lost election)	Democratic	1958	Pat Brown
37	Glenn M. Anderson (1913–1994)	January 5, 1959 – January 2, 1967 (lost election)	Democratic	1962	Pat Brown
38	Robert Finch (1925–1995)	January 2, 1967 – January 8, 1969 (resigned) (Note: Finch resigned to be United States Secretary of Health, Education, and Welfare.)	Republican	1966	Ronald Reagan
39	Edwin Reinecke (1924–2016)	January 8, 1969 – October 2, 1974 (resigned) (Note: Reinecke was forced to resign when convicted and sentenced for perjury; it was later overturned on appeal.)	Republican	Appointed by governor	Ronald Reagan
39	Edwin Reinecke (1924–2016)	January 8, 1969 – October 2, 1974 (resigned)	Republican	1970	Ronald Reagan
40	John L. Harmer (1934–2019)	October 2, 1974 – January 6, 1975 (lost election)	Republican	Appointed by governor	Ronald Reagan
41	Mervyn Dymally (1926–2012)	January 6, 1975 – January 8, 1979 (lost election)	Democratic	1974	Jerry Brown
42	Mike Curb (b. 1944)	January 8, 1979 – January 3, 1983 (did not run) (Note: Curb instead ran unsuccessfully for the Republican nomination for governor.)	Republican	1978	Jerry Brown
43	Leo T. McCarthy (1930–2007)	January 3, 1983 – January 3, 1995 (did not run)	Democratic	1982	George Deukmejian
43	Leo T. McCarthy (1930–2007)	January 3, 1983 – January 3, 1995 (did not run)	Democratic	1986	George Deukmejian
43	Leo T. McCarthy (1930–2007)	January 3, 1983 – January 3, 1995 (did not run)	Democratic	1990	Pete Wilson
44	Gray Davis (b. 1942)	January 3, 1995 – January 4, 1999 (elected governor)	Democratic	1994	Pete Wilson
45	Cruz Bustamante (b. 1953)	January 4, 1999 – January 7, 2007 (term-limited)	Democratic	1998	Gray Davis (recalled November 17, 2003)
45	Cruz Bustamante (b. 1953)	January 4, 1999 – January 7, 2007 (term-limited)	Democratic	2002	Gray Davis (recalled November 17, 2003)
45	Cruz Bustamante (b. 1953)	January 4, 1999 – January 7, 2007 (term-limited)	Democratic	2002	Arnold Schwarzenegger
46	John Garamendi (b. 1945)	January 7, 2007 – November 3, 2009 (resigned) (Note: Garamendi resigned, having been elected to the United States House of Representatives.)	Democratic	2006	Arnold Schwarzenegger
47	Mona Pasquil (acting) (b. 1962)	November 3, 2009 – April 27, 2010 (successor took office)	Democratic	Appointed by governor (Note: Pasquil was appointed acting lieutenant governor until the nominated replacement, Abel Maldonado, could be confirmed.)	Arnold Schwarzenegger
48	Abel Maldonado (b. 1967)	April 27, 2010 – January 10, 2011 (lost election)	Republican	Appointed by governor	Arnold Schwarzenegger
48	Abel Maldonado (b. 1967)	April 27, 2010 – January 10, 2011 (lost election)	Republican	2010 (Note: Newsom delayed his swearing in as lieutenant governor until January 10, 2011, to remain mayor of San Francisco; Maldonado stayed on as lieutenant governor until then.)	Jerry Brown
49	Gavin Newsom (b. 1967)	January 10, 2011 – January 7, 2019 (elected governor)	Democratic	2010	Jerry Brown
49	Gavin Newsom (b. 1967)	January 10, 2011 – January 7, 2019 (elected governor)	Democratic	2014	Jerry Brown
50	Eleni Kounalakis (b. 1966)	January 7, 2019 – Incumbent (Note: Kounalakis' second term began on January 2, 2023.)	Democratic	2018	Gavin Newsom
50	Eleni Kounalakis (b. 1966)	January 7, 2019 – Incumbent	Democratic	2022	Gavin Newsom
