= Moonville =

Moonville may refer to:

- Moonville, Indiana
- Moonville, Ohio

== See also ==
- Moenville, South Dakota
- Monoville, California
