= 1855 California lieutenant gubernatorial election =

- September 5, 1855

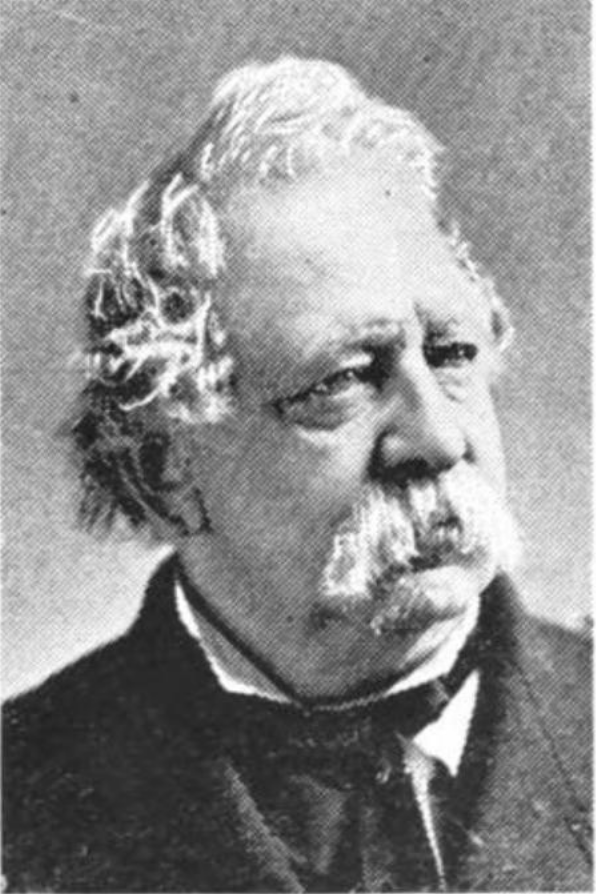
Nominee	Robert M. Anderson	Samuel Purdy
Party	Know Nothing	Democratic
Popular vote	49,385	47,669
Percentage	50.88%	49.12%
Lieutenant Governor before election
Samuel Purdy
Democratic
Elected Lieutenant Governor
Robert M. Anderson
Know Nothing

The 1855 California lieutenant gubernatorial election was held on September 5, 1855, in order to elect the lieutenant governor of California. Know Nothing nominee Robert M. Anderson defeated Democratic nominee and incumbent lieutenant governor Samuel Purdy.

== General election ==
On election day, September 5, 1855, Know Nothing nominee Robert M. Anderson won the election by a margin of 1,716 votes against his opponent Democratic nominee Samuel Purdy, thereby gaining Know Nothing control over the office of lieutenant governor. Anderson was sworn in as the 4th lieutenant governor of California on January 9, 1856.

=== Results ===
California lieutenant gubernatorial election, 1855
Party	Candidate	Votes	%
Know Nothing	Robert M. Anderson	49,385	50.88
Democratic	Samuel Purdy (incumbent)	47,669	49.12
Total votes		97,054	100.00
Know Nothing gain from Democratic			
