= 1857 California lieutenant gubernatorial election =

- September 2, 1857
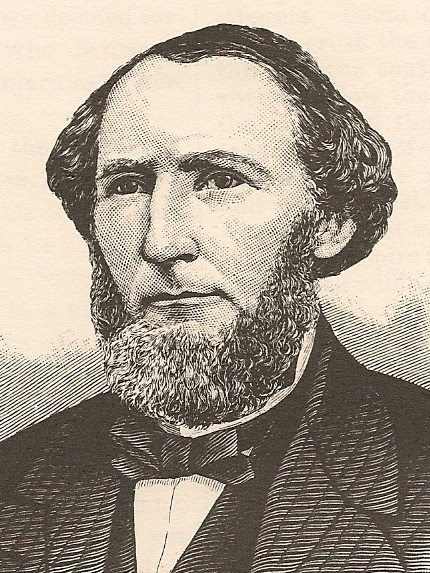

Nominee	Joseph Walkup	J. A. Raymond	David W. Cheesman
Party	Democratic	Know Nothing	Republican
Popular vote	57,336	19,718	16,800
Percentage	61.09%	21.01%	17.90%
- County results Walkup: 40–50% 50–60% 60–70% 70–80% 80–90% >90% Cheesman: 40–50% No Data
Lieutenant Governor before election
Robert M. Anderson
Know Nothing
Elected Lieutenant Governor
Joseph Walkup
Democratic

The 1857 California lieutenant gubernatorial election was held on September 2, 1857, in order to elect the lieutenant governor of California. Democratic nominee and incumbent member of the California State Senate Joseph Walkup defeated Know Nothing nominee J. A. Raymond and Republican nominee David W. Cheesman.

== General election ==
On election day, September 2, 1857, Democratic nominee Joseph Walkup won the election by a margin of 37,618 votes against his foremost opponent Know Nothing nominee J. A. Raymond, thereby gaining Democratic control over the office of lieutenant governor. Walkup was sworn in as the 5th lieutenant governor of California on January 8, 1858.

=== Results ===
California lieutenant gubernatorial election, 1857
Party	Candidate	Votes	%
Democratic	Joseph Walkup	57,336	61.09
Know Nothing	J. A. Raymond	19,718	21.01
Republican	David W. Cheesman	16,800	17.90
Total votes		93,854	100.00
Democratic gain from Know Nothing			
