= Richard Irwin (California politician) =

American politician

11th President pro tempore of the California State Senate
- In office January 7, 1861 – May 20, 1861
- Preceded by: Christopher J. Lansing
- Succeeded by: James M. Shafter

Member of the California State Senate
- In office 1861–1862
- Constituency: 24th district
- In office 1860–1861
- Constituency: 14th district

Member of the California State Assembly
- In office 1856–1858
- Constituency: 14th district
- In office 1852–1855
- Constituency: 17th district

Personal details
- Born: Richard Irwin; 1827 or 1828 Uniontown, Pennsylvania, U.S.
- Died: February 15, 1869 (age 41) Rich Bar, California, U.S.
- Party: Democratic; Union Democratic

Military service
- Branch/service: United States Army
- Battles/wars: Mexican-American War

Richard Irwin (1827 or 1828 – February 15, 1869) was an American pioneer and politician who served in the California State Assembly and California State Senate. He was the Democratic nominee for Lieutenant Governor of California in the 1861 election.

== Biography ==
Irwin was born in Uniontown, Pennsylvania and fought with distinction in the Mexican-American War before migrating to California in 1849. He became a miner in Rich Bar (now Diamondville), and then became an attorney in the miners' courts. In 1855, he purchased the business of Clark, Wagner & Co. merchants in Rich Bar, along with his partner Robert M. Blakemore. The partnership would be dissolved in the spring of 1865.

Irwin died on February 15, 1869, in Rich Bar at the age of 41. He was buried in the Rich Bar cemetery.

== Political career ==
He was elected to the California State Assembly in 1852, representing Butte County, and again in 1856 representing Plumas County. In 1860 he was elected to the California State Senate representing both Butte and Plumas Counties, but was defeated in 1862. Irwin served as President pro tempore of the Senate between January and May 1861.

He was the Union Democratic nominee for Lieutenant Governor of California in the 1861 election, losing to Republican nominee John F. Chellis.

Preceded by Christopher J. Lansing	President pro tempore of the California State Senate; 1861	Succeeded by James M. Shafter
