= William T. Jeter =

American politician (1850–1930)

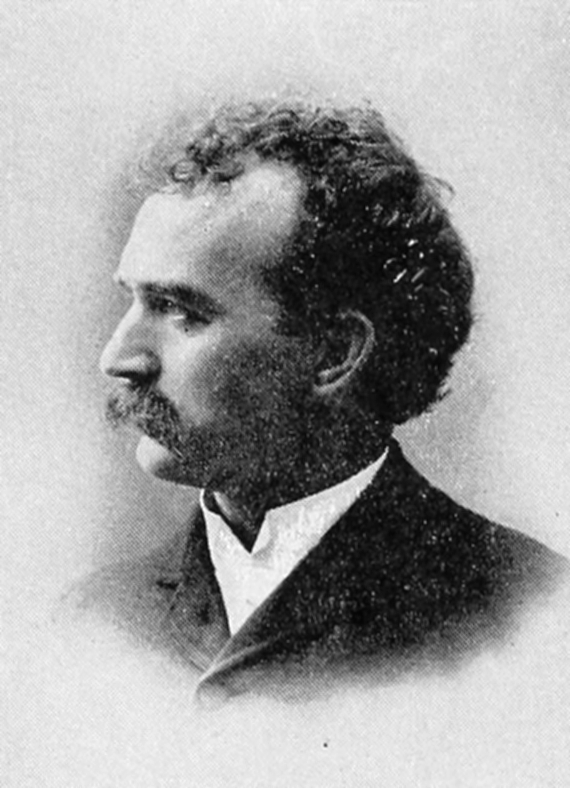
- Jeter c. 1892

21st Lieutenant Governor of California
- In office October 25, 1895 – January 3, 1899
- Governor: James Budd
- Preceded by: Spencer G. Millard
- Succeeded by: Jacob H. Neff

Personal details
- Born: October 19, 1850 Menard County, Illinois, U.S.
- Died: May 15, 1930 (aged 79) Santa Cruz, California, U.S.
- Resting place: Santa Cruz Memorial Park
- Party: Democratic
- Occupation: Politician, lawyer

William Thomas Jeter (October 19, 1850 – May 15, 1930) was an American Democratic politician and lawyer in Santa Cruz, California. He served as the 21st Lieutenant Governor of California.

== Life and career ==
He was born in Menard County, Illinois, the third son and eighth child of William Griffin Jeter and Elizabeth McCutchen Berry. He was raised in Illinois and Missouri, worked on his family's farms, and moved to California in the early 1870s.

Jeter studied at the University of California, Hastings College of the Law. He attained admission to the bar, and practiced in Santa Cruz.

Active in politics as a Democrat, in 1882 he became chairman of the Santa Cruz County Democratic Committee. In 1884 he was elected county district attorney, and he won reelection twice. He later served as a member of the Santa Cruz City Council. He served as Mayor of Santa Cruz, California from 1892 to 1894. In 1894 he was the Democratic nominee for lieutenant governor, and lost to Spencer G. Millard. At the top of the ticket, Democrat James Budd narrowly defeated Republican Morris M. Estee for governor.

In October 1895, Millard died. Budd appointed Jeter to complete Millard's term as Lieutenant Governor. Jeter served from October 25, 1895, to January 3, 1899. For many years, Jeter was president of the Santa Cruz County National Bank and the Santa Cruz County Bank of Savings and Loan.

Jeter died in Santa Cruz on May 15, 1930. He was interred at Santa Cruz Memorial Park in Santa Cruz, California.

Political offices
Preceded by G. Bowman	Mayor of Santa Cruz; 1892–1894	Succeeded by Robert Effey
Preceded by Spencer G. Millard	Lieutenant Governor of California; 1895–1899	Succeeded by Jacob H. Neff
