= 1974 California lieutenant gubernatorial election =

- November 5, 1974
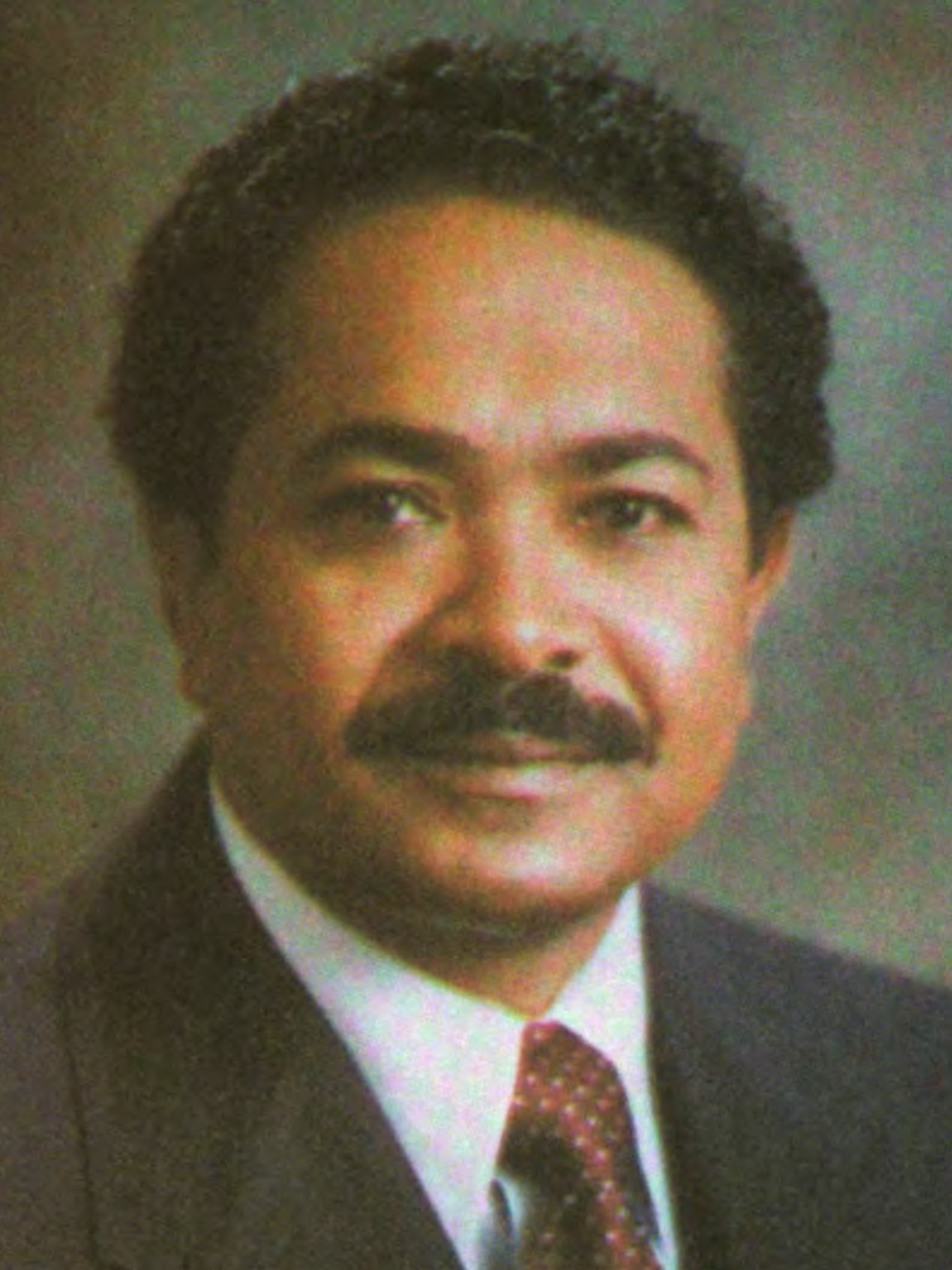

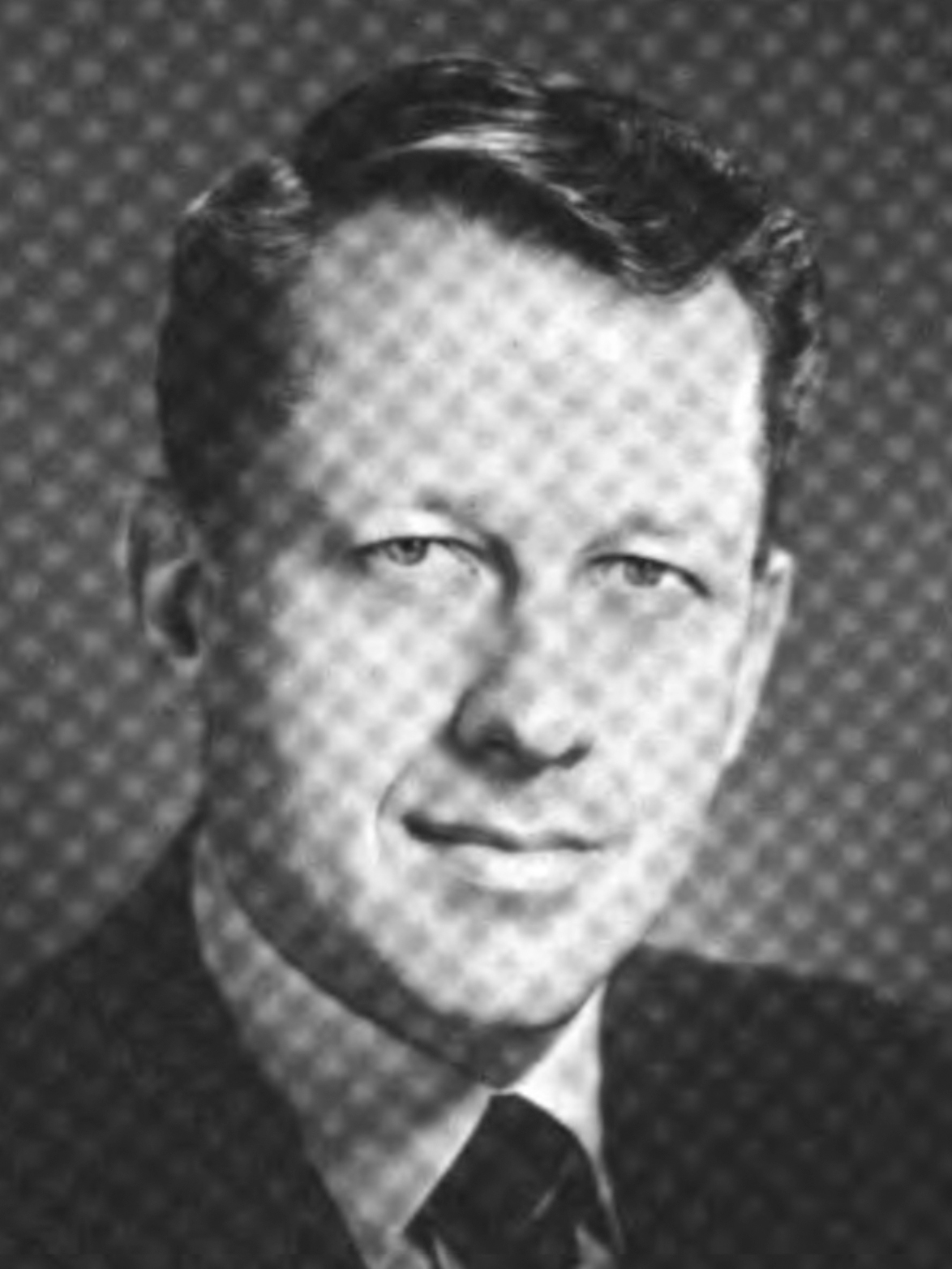
Nominee	Mervyn Dymally	John L. Harmer
Party	Democratic	Republican
Popular vote	2,986,537	2,812,636
Percentage	49.19%	46.32%
- County results Dymally: 40–50% 50–60% 60–70% Harmer: 40–50% 50–60% 60–70%
Lieutenant Governor before election
John L. Harmer
Republican
Elected Lieutenant Governor
Mervyn Dymally
Democratic

The 1974 California lieutenant gubernatorial election was held on November 5, 1974. Democratic nominee Mervyn Dymally narrowly defeated Republican incumbent John L. Harmer with 49.19% of the vote.

== Primary elections ==
Primary elections were held on June 4, 1974.

=== Democratic primary ===
==== Candidates ====
- Robert Battin
- Mervyn Dymally, state senator
- Fidel González Jr.
- Cy King
- A. John Merlo
- Howard Miller
- Lawrence E. Walsh, state senator
- Elizabeth Smith Weingand

==== Results ====
Democratic primary results
Party	Candidate	Votes	%
Democratic	Mervyn Dymally	777,522	29.94
Democratic	Lawrence E. Walsh	632,216	24.34
Democratic	Howard Miller	443,730	17.08
Democratic	Elizabeth Smith Weingand	278,467	10.72
Democratic	Robert Battin	160,542	6.18
Democratic	Fidel González Jr.	137,381	5.29
Democratic	A. John Merlo	113,606	4.37
Democratic	Cy King	53,870	2.07
Total votes		2,597,334	100.00

=== Republican primary ===
==== Candidates ====
- John L. Harmer, state senator
- John Veneman, state assemblyman

==== Results ====
Republican primary results
Party	Candidate	Votes	%
Republican	John L. Harmer (incumbent)	956,907	56.75
Republican	John Veneman	729,385	43.25
Total votes		1,686,292	100.00

== General election ==
=== Candidates ===
Major party candidates

- Mervyn Dymally, Democratic
- John L. Harmer, Republican

Other candidates

- Alberta M. Procell, American Independent
- Marilyn Seals, Peace and Freedom

=== Results ===
1974 California lieutenant gubernatorial election
Party	Candidate	Votes	%	±%
Democratic	Mervyn Dymally	2,986,537	49.19%	+6.88%
Republican	John L. Harmer (incumbent)	2,812,636	46.32%	−8.47%
Peace and Freedom	Marilyn Seals	154,332	2.54%	+0.93%
American Independent	Alberta M. Procell	117,231	1.93%	+0.64%
Majority		173,901		
Turnout				
Democratic gain from Republican		Swing		
