= 1970 California lieutenant gubernatorial election =

- November 3, 1970
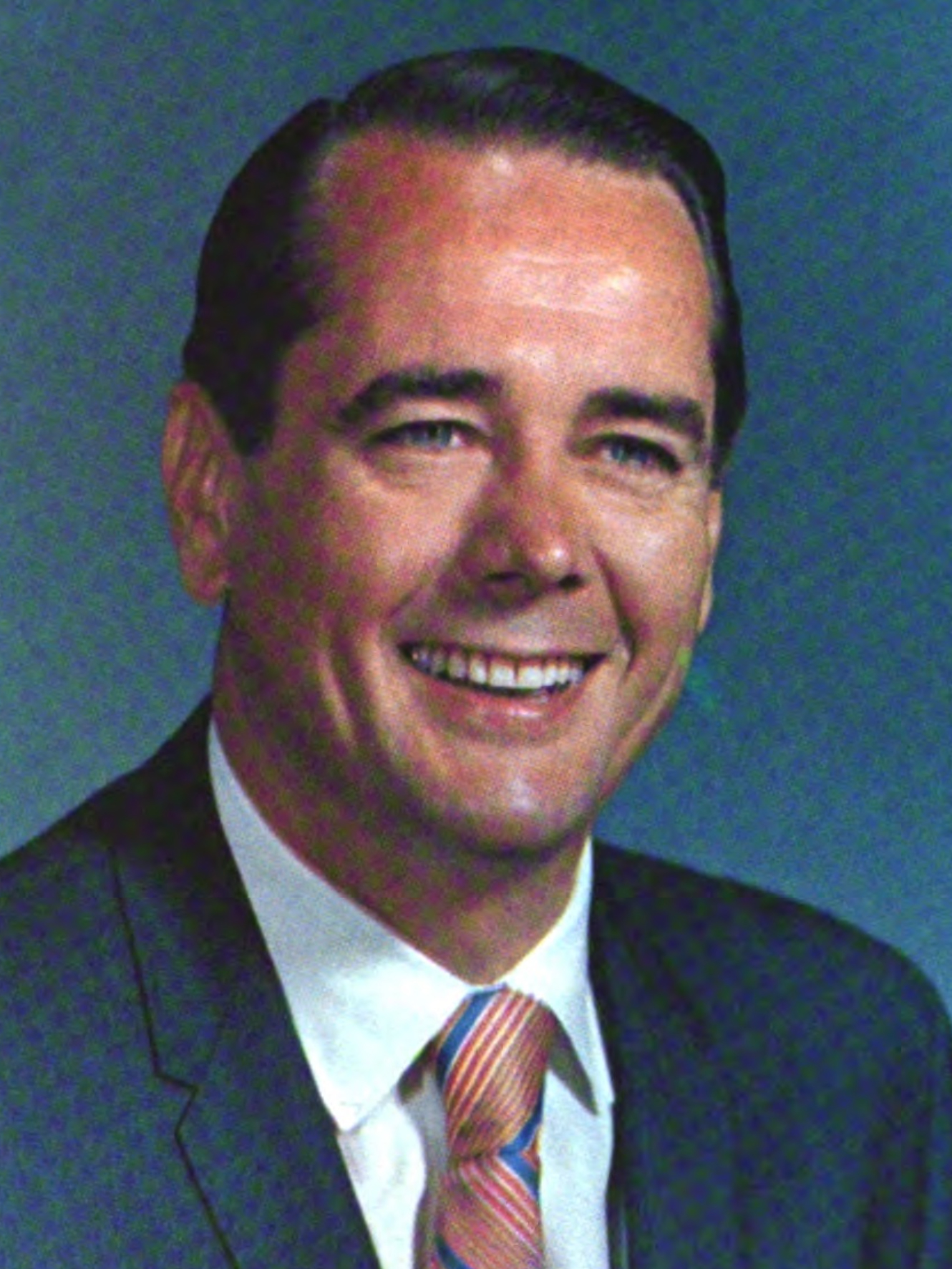

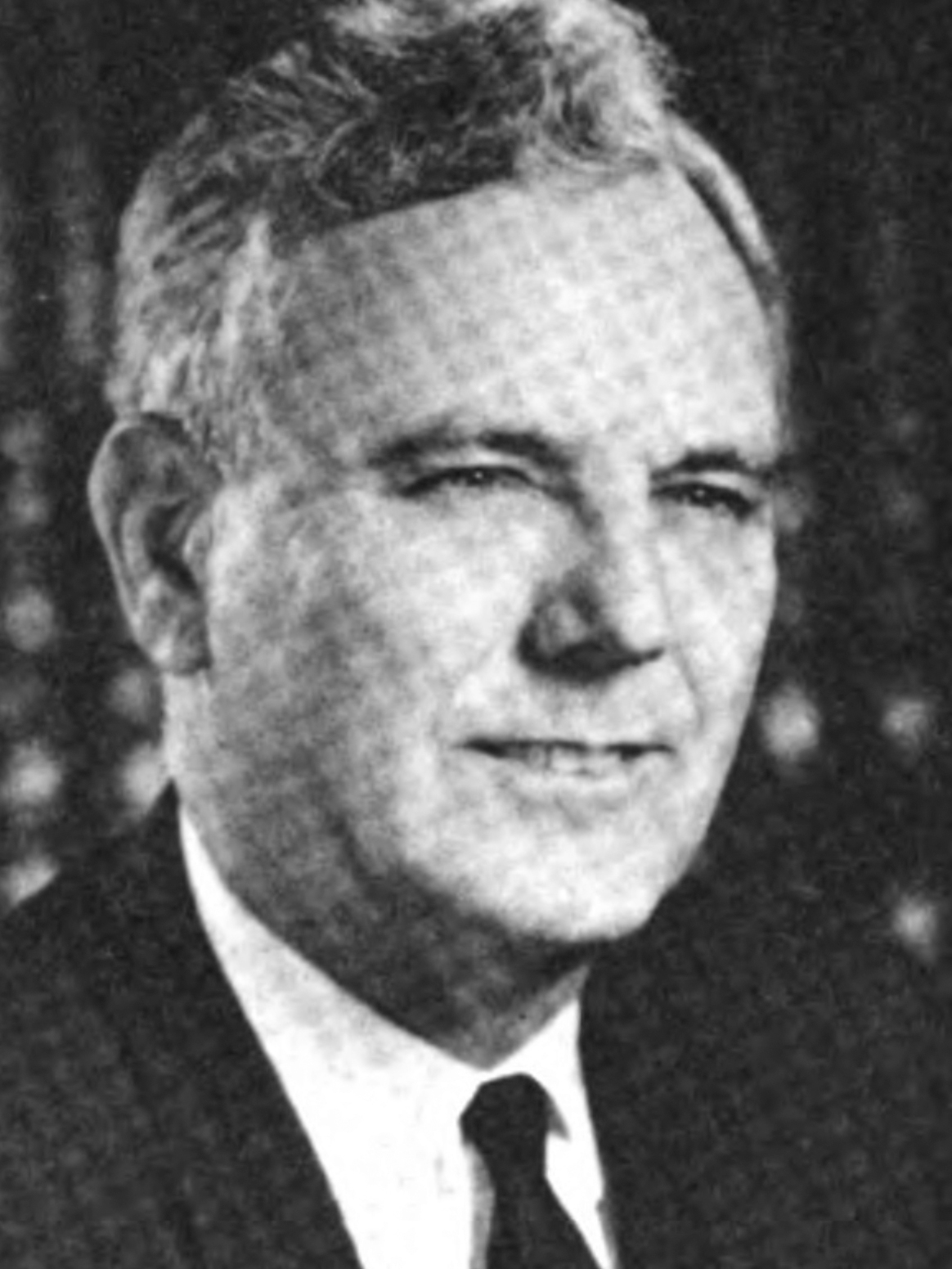
Nominee	Edwin Reinecke	Al Alquist
Party	Republican	Democratic
Popular vote	3,521,065	2,718,904
Percentage	54.79%	42.31%
- County results Reinecke: 40–50% 50–60% 60–70% 70–80% Alquist: 40–50% 50–60%
Lieutenant Governor before election
Edwin Reinecke
Republican
Elected Lieutenant Governor
Edwin Reinecke
Republican

The 1970 California lieutenant gubernatorial election was held on November 3, 1970. Incumbent Republican Edwin Reinecke defeated Democratic nominee Al Alquist with 54.79% of the vote.

== Primary elections ==
Primary elections were held on June 2, 1970.

=== Democratic primary ===
==== Candidates ====
- Al Alquist, State Senator
- Robert A. Wenke
- Robert L. Coate
- Cecilia A. Pedroza

==== Results ====
Democratic primary results
Party	Candidate	Votes	%
Democratic	Al Alquist	1,053,748	47.80
Democratic	Robert A. Wenke	615,851	27.94
Democratic	Robert L. Coate	293,124	13.30
Democratic	Cecilia A. Pedroza	241,585	10.96
Total votes		2,204,308	100.00

== General election ==
=== Candidates ===
Major party candidates

- Edwin Reinecke, Republican
- Al Alquist, Democratic

Other candidates

- John Haag, Peace and Freedom
- Merwun H. Hemp, American Independent

=== Results ===
1970 California lieutenant gubernatorial election
Party	Candidate	Votes	%	±%
Republican	Edwin Reinecke (incumbent)	3,521,065	54.79%	−5.00%
Democratic	Al Alquist	2,718,904	42.31%	+2.10%
Peace and Freedom	John Haag	103,590	1.61%	+1.61%
American Independent	Merwun H. Hemp	83,113	1.29%	+1.29%
Majority		802,161		
Turnout				
Republican hold		Swing		
