= Christopher J. Lansing =

American attorney (1828–1884)

10th President pro tempore of the California State Senate
- In office January 19, 1860 – April 13, 1860
- Preceded by: Isaac N. Quinn
- Succeeded by: Richard Irwin

Member of the California State Senate from the 16th district
- In office 1858–1860

Personal details
- Born: September 15, 1828 New York, U.S.
- Died: August 7, 1884 (aged 55) Eureka, Nevada or Nevada City, California, U.S.
- Party: Democratic
- Spouse(s): Elizabeth Yates (m. 1852; died 1853) Maria Yates (m.????; died 1859); Anna (m. 1863)
- Children: 1

Christopher J. Lansing (September 15, 1828 – August 7, 1884) was an American attorney and politician who served in the California State Senate, serving as its 10th President pro tempore in 1860.

== Biography ==
Lansing was born in New York state in 1828; his name is sometimes given as Charles J. Lansing. He married Elizabeth Yates in 1852, and after her death the following year, married her sister Maria Yates. He also had a third wife, Anna, who he married in 1863. Lansing practiced law in Treasure City, Nevada and Eureka, Nevada. He also spent his time in Nevada City and Nevada County, California.

In 1858, Lansing was elected to the California State Senate from the 16th district, and we reelected again in 1859. In 1860, he served as the 10th President pro tempore of the Senate between January and April.

Lansing died on August 7, 1884 in either Eureka, Nevada or Nevada City, California.

Preceded by Isaac N. Quinn	President pro tempore of the California State Senate; 1860	Succeeded by Richard Irwin
