= 1861 California lieutenant gubernatorial election =

- September 4, 1861

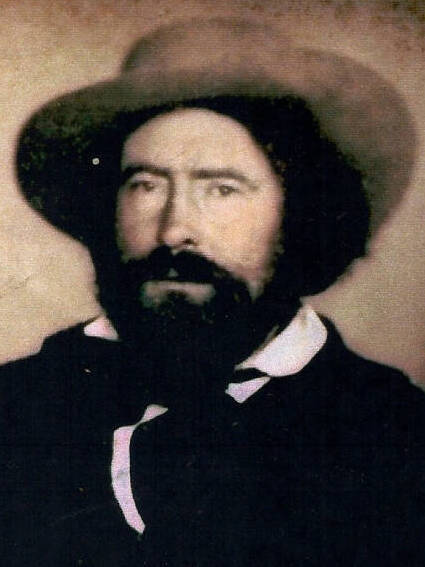
Nominee	John F. Chellis	Richard Irwin	Jasper O'Farrell
Party	Republican	Democratic	Southern Democratic
Popular vote	52,593	34,479	32,356
Percentage	44.04%	28.87%	27.09%
- County results Chellis: 30–40% 40–50% 50–60% 60–70% Irwin: 30–40% 40–50% 50–60% 70–80% O'Farrell: 30–40% 40–50% 50–60% 60–70% 70–80%
Lieutenant Governor before election
Pablo de la Guerra (Acting)
Democratic
Elected Lieutenant Governor
John F. Chellis
Republican

The 1861 California lieutenant gubernatorial election was held on September 4, 1861, in order to elect the lieutenant governor of California. Republican nominee John F. Chellis defeated Union Democratic nominee and incumbent President pro tempore of the California State Senate Richard Irwin and Southern Democratic nominee Jasper O'Farrell.

== General election ==
On election day, September 4, 1861, Republican nominee John F. Chellis won the election by a margin of 18,114 votes against his foremost opponent Union Democratic nominee Richard Irwin, thereby gaining Republican control over the office of lieutenant governor. Chellis was sworn in as the 9th lieutenant governor of California on January 10, 1862.

=== Results ===
California lieutenant gubernatorial election, 1861
Party	Candidate	Votes	%
Republican	John F. Chellis	52,593	44.04
Democratic	Richard Irwin	34,479	28.87
Southern Democratic	Jasper O'Farrell	32,356	27.09
Total votes		119,428	100.00
Republican gain from Democratic			
