= Spencer G. Millard =

American politician (1856–1895)

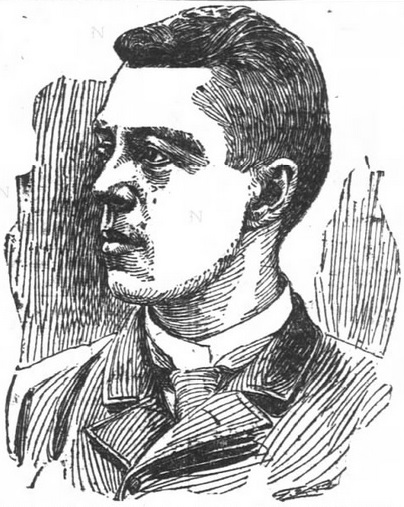

20th Lieutenant Governor of California
- In office January 11, 1895 – October 24, 1895
- Governor: James Budd
- Preceded by: John B. Reddick
- Succeeded by: William T. Jeter

Personal details
- Born: Spencer Gurdon Millard; July 10, 1856 Ionia, Michigan, U.S.
- Died: October 24, 1895 (aged 39) Los Angeles, California, U.S.
- Resting place: Angelus-Rosedale Cemetery
- Political party: Republican
- Spouse: Ida N. Hall
- Occupation: Politician, lawyer, school teacher

Spencer Gurdon Millard (July 10, 1856 – October 24, 1895) was an American Republican politician, lawyer and school teacher. He was elected as the 20th Lieutenant Governor of California, his term to run from 1895 to 1899, but died in office within the first year.

== Life and career ==
He was born in Ionia, Michigan, the son of Gurdon J. Millard and Joanna Freeman. His sister was Frances M. Millard, who died in India, where she went as a missionary. Millard attended Hillsdale College, where he studied for several years, graduating from the institution in 1877. He then obtained a teaching position at the grade school in Carson City, Michigan, and served in the capacity as principal for about three years.

In about 1880, he began the study of law with William O. Webster, an attorney at Ionia, and after studying for about two years he was admitted to the bar. He then became a member of the firm of Webster & Millard, in which he was engaged in the practice of law until he removed to Los Angeles, California, in 1887.

On June 17, 1885, Millard and Ida N. Hall were married in Ionia. They had two children, Spencer J. Millard (1888-before 1952), who was born in Ionia, Michigan, and died in Tennessee, and Gertrude Millard (1891–1979), who was born and died in Los Angeles.

In Los Angeles, Millard practiced law alone. Soon after his arrival, he built a house in the Angeleno Heights tract. One of his first public appearances in politics was at the Republican City Convention in the fall of 1892, when John Q. Tufts was nominated for Mayor. Millard's bearing as a Presiding Officer was seen as dignified, his decisions being usually prompt and accurate and his voice excellent, as it could be readily heard. He presided so acceptably that he was called to wield the gavel at the Republican County Convention in May 1894, when delegates were chosen to the State Convention, which a short time later nominated him for Lieutenant Governor.

During the campaign following his nomination, Millard spoke for 60 consecutive nights, except Sundays, and traveled throughout the state. At the close of the campaign, when the news arrived that he was elected, he was heard to remark that he felt very well, and, barring a slight hoarseness, that appeared to be his condition. He had, it was said, not had a physician for 20 years, and his robust physical condition seemed to have withstood the strain of the campaign without any perceptible injury.

Shortly before the time of assembling the Legislature, in January 1895, Millard was ill with an attack of influenza, which developed into pneumonia. He was ill at home for about two months and then went to Indio, in hope of recovering his health. Afterward, he returned to Los Angeles, and during the latter part of June went East to the home of his father, who then lived in the northern part of Michigan.

In the first week of September, he returned to California accompanied by his cousin, Jay B. Millard (1854–1936), principal of the Spring-Street School. He remained in Northern California, spending most of the time at Shasta Springs near Dunsmuir, until the afternoon of Sunday, October 20, when he left Dunsmuir for Southern California.

During the time of his illness and death, William T. Jeter was his replacement and served out Millard's term of office. As Lieutenant Governor of California, Millard was ex officio Regent of the University of California.

Spencer G. Millard died at age 39 in Los Angeles. The Lieutenant Governor was given a state funeral on October 27, 1895. He is interred in Angelus-Rosedale Cemetery.

Political offices
Preceded by John B. Reddick	Lieutenant Governor of California; 1895	Succeeded by William T. Jeter
