= Moenville, South Dakota =

Human settlement in United States of America

Coordinates: 44°28′35″N 101°15′20″W

Moenville is an extinct town in Haakon County, in the U.S. state of South Dakota. The GNIS classifies it as a populated place.

== History ==
A post office called Moenville was established in 1908, and remained in operation until 1953. The town had the name of Gustave Moen, a pioneer merchant.
