= Mervyn Dymally =

American politician (1926–2012)

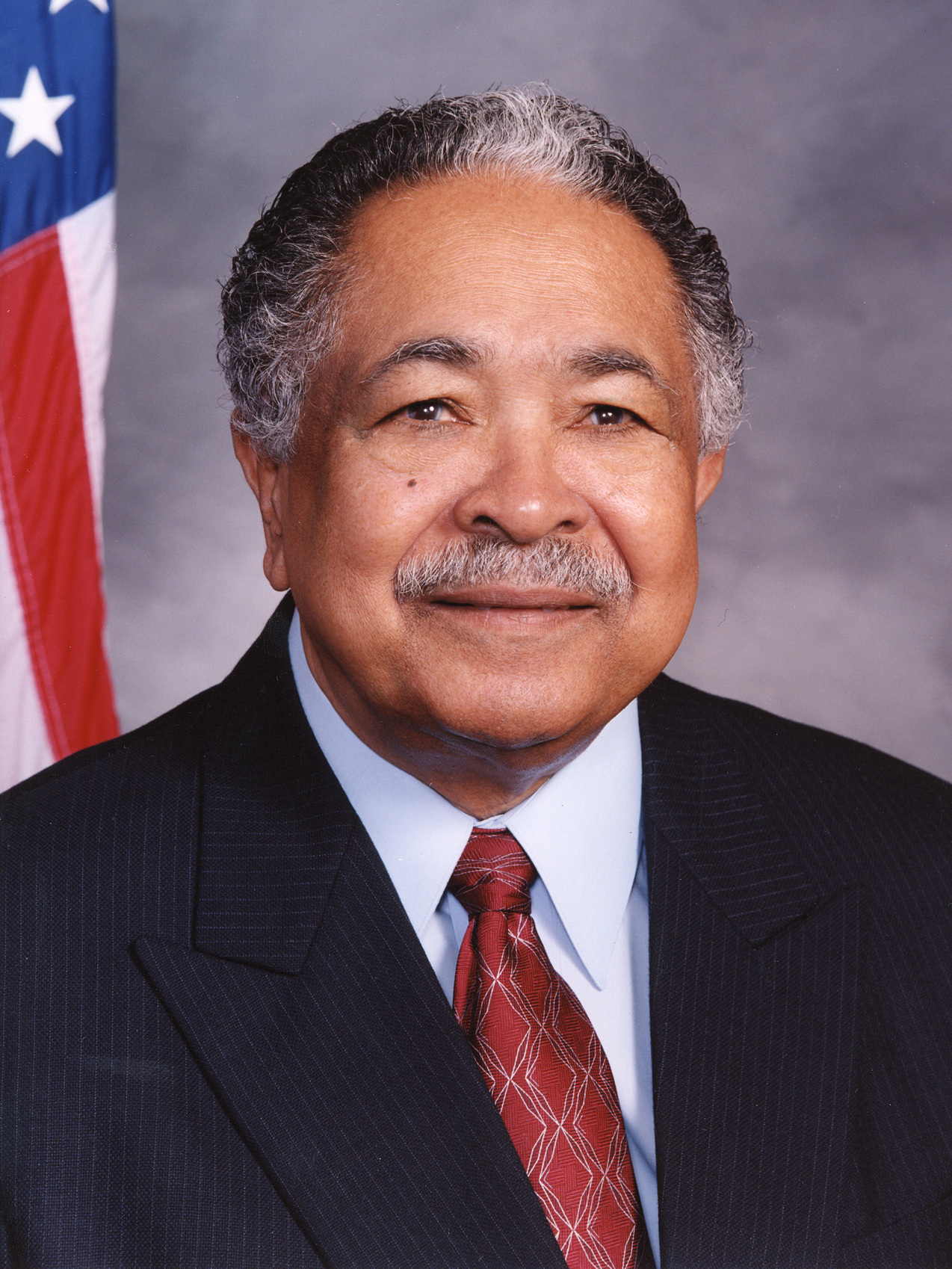
- Official portrait, 2008

Member of the California State Assembly from the 52nd district
- In office December 7, 2002 – December 1, 2008
- Preceded by: Carl Washington
- Succeeded by: Isadore Hall III

Member of the U.S. House of Representatives from California's 31st district
- In office January 3, 1981 – January 3, 1993
- Preceded by: Charles H. Wilson
- Succeeded by: Walter R. Tucker III (redistricted)

41st Lieutenant Governor of California
- In office January 6, 1975 – January 8, 1979
- Governor: Jerry Brown
- Preceded by: John L. Harmer
- Succeeded by: Mike Curb

Member of the California Senate from the 29th district
- In office January 2, 1967 – January 6, 1975
- Preceded by: Vernon Sturgeon
- Succeeded by: Bill Greene

Member of the California State Assembly from the 53rd district
- In office January 7, 1963 – January 2, 1967
- Preceded by: Montivel Burke
- Succeeded by: Bill Greene

Personal details
- Born: Mervyn Malcolm Dymally; May 12, 1926 Cedros, Trinidad and Tobago
- Died: October 7, 2012 (aged 86) Los Angeles, California, U.S.
- Resting place: Holy Cross Cemetery
- Party: Democratic
- Spouse(s): Amentha Wilkes; Alice Gueno
- Children: 2
- Education: Lincoln University (attended); Chapman University (attended); California State University, Los Angeles (BA); California State University, Sacramento (MA); United States International University (PhD)

Mervyn Malcolm Dymally (May 12, 1926 – October 7, 2012) was an American politician from California. A Democrat, he served in the California State Assembly (1963–1966) and the California State Senate (1967–1975), as the 41st lieutenant governor of California (1975–1979), and in the U.S. House of Representatives (1981–1993). Dymally returned to politics a decade later to again serve in the California State Assembly (2003–2008).

Dymally was the second African-American to hold statewide office in California, following Wilson Riles, who served as California Superintendent of Public Instruction starting in 1971.

== Early life and education ==
Born in Cedros, Trinidad and Tobago, Dymally first received his secondary education at Naparima College before transferring to Saint Benedict's College, both in San Fernando. He is of Dougla (mixed African and Indian) descent.

He moved to the United States to study journalism at Lincoln University in Jefferson City, Missouri. After a semester there, he moved to the greater Los Angeles area to attend Chapman University, and completed a Bachelor of Arts in education at California State University, Los Angeles in 1954. Dymally became a member of Kappa Alpha Psi fraternity in 1949. Dymally became a U.S. citizen in 1957.

In 1969, while serving in the California State Legislature, he earned a master's degree in government from California State University, Sacramento. Dymally earned his doctorate in human behavior from United States International University (later merged into Alliant International University) in San Diego .

== Career ==
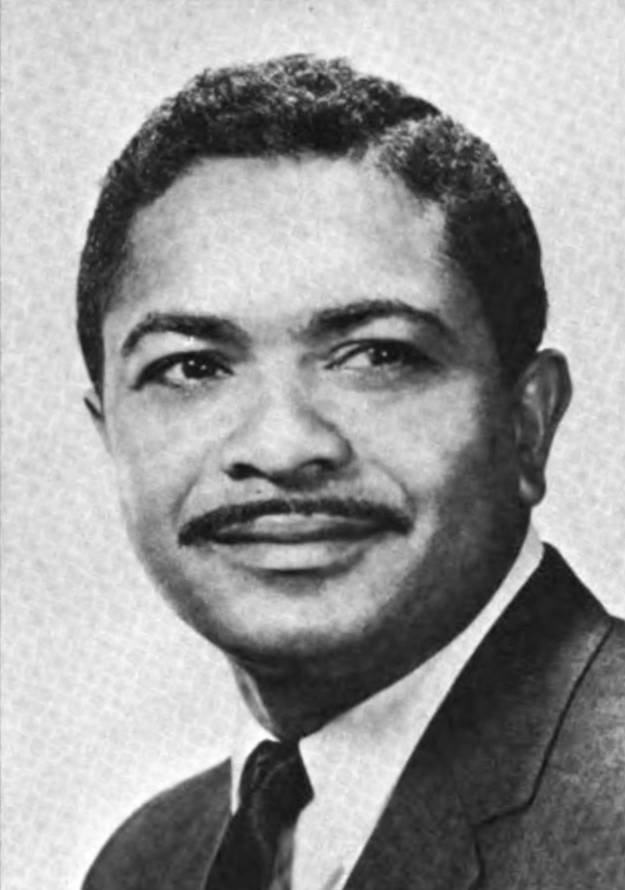
Dymally's official portrait while in the State Senate, 1967

Dymally was first elected to the California State Assembly, the lower house of the state Legislature, in 1962, from District 53; he was re-elected in 1964.

He was elected to the California State Senate, the Legislature's upper house, in 1966; initially for a two-year term. The U.S. Supreme Court had ruled that state legislatures must reapportion their upper houses on the basis of population; in the process in California, the even-numbered districts elected their senators for full four-year terms in 1966. As Dymally was in District 29, he had to run again in 1968; he won and was re-elected in 1972.

=== Lt. Governor ===
In 1974, Dymally was elected lieutenant governor (49.2%-46.3%) over Republican incumbent John L. Harmer, who had just been appointed to fill a vacancy in the office a month earlier and until then had been Dymally's colleague in the state Senate.

Dymally was the first Trinidadian to serve California as a state senator and as lieutenant governor. He and George L. Brown of Colorado became the first two African Americans elected to the office of lieutenant governor since Oscar Dunn did so in Louisiana during Reconstruction.

In the tightly contested race for lieutenant governor in 1978, Dymally's bid for re-election was derailed when Michael Franchetti, an aide to State Senator George Deukmejian, floated a false rumor that Dymally was about to be indicted. The story, coming days before the election, harmed the Dymally campaign, and Dymally lost to Republican Mike Curb.

Franchetti later said that the source of the rumor was a Los Angeles Times reporter, who called the Justice Department trying to confirm its authenticity. Franchetti could not substantiate the rumor but included it in a report. The report was passed to Curb's office with the rumor part erased, after which it moved to broadcaster Bill Stout, who announced it as fact on Los Angeles radio station KNX (AM) and its CBS affiliates. (Stout's wife worked for Curb.) Then-Attorney General Evelle J. Younger filed a letter of reprimand in Franchetti's personnel records, accusing him of a breach of responsibility.

Dymally was an old friend of Peoples Temple founder Jim Jones. When Jones decided to move his congregation to Jonestown, Guyana, Dymally "wrote the Guyanese prime minister [Forbes Burnham] to reassure him that Jones was an upstanding citizen." The Jonestown compound would be the site of the mass suicide of over 900 people on November 18, 1978.

=== Congress ===
In 1980, two years after losing the lieutenant governorship, Dymally ran for Congress in District 31, against former U.S. representative Mark W. Hannaford (who had served two terms in a nearby district) and 18-year incumbent Charles H. Wilson, who had been reprimanded by his U.S. House colleagues for financial misconduct in the Koreagate scandal. Dymally won the primary with 49% of the vote, to 24% for Hannaford and just 15% for Wilson; he went on to defeat Republican Don Grimshaw in the general election, 64%-36%. He was one of the first persons of Dougla (mixed African and Indian) origin to serve in Congress.

In 1983 Dymally joined with seven other U.S. representatives to sponsor a resolution to impeach Ronald Reagan over his sudden and unexpected invasion of Grenada. He retired in 1992, after six terms in Congress.

In the 1990s, Dymally served as a paid lobbyist for the country of Mauritania, attempting to present the country as engaged in abolishing every remnant of slavery.

=== Return to state assembly ===
Dymally came out of retirement and returned to the State Assembly in 2002 when Assemblyman Carl Washington was term limited. He served for six years and then, himself term-limited, ran to return to the State Senate in 2008. At 82, he was defeated in the Senate primary by Rod Wright.

=== Death and burial ===
Dymally died in 2012 in Los Angeles and is buried at Holy Cross Cemetery in Culver City.

=== Legacy ===
Mervyn M. Dymally High School, at 88th and San Pedro streets in South Central Los Angeles and part of the Los Angeles Unified School District, is named in his honor.

== Congressional electoral history ==
Democratic primary results, California's 31st congressional district, June 3, 1980
Party	Candidate	Votes	%
Democratic	Mervyn M. Dymally	29,916	49.1
Democratic	Mark W. Hannaford	14,512	23.8
Democratic	Charles H. Wilson (incumbent)	9,320	15.3
Democratic	Bradford E. "Happy" Henschel	4,953	8.1
Democratic	Emanuel Gary Jr.	2,239	3.7
Total votes		60,940	100.0

1980 United States House of Representatives elections in California
Party	Candidate	Votes	%
Democratic	Mervyn M. Dymally	69,146	64.4
Republican	Don Grimshaw	38,203	35.6
Total votes		107,349	100.0
Democratic hold			

1982 United States House of Representatives elections in California
Party	Candidate	Votes	%
Democratic	Mervyn M. Dymally (Incumbent)	86,718	72.4
Republican	Henry C. Minturn	33,043	27.6
Total votes		119,761	100.0
Democratic hold			

1984 United States House of Representatives elections in California
Party	Candidate	Votes	%
Democratic	Mervyn M. Dymally (Incumbent)	100,658	70.7
Republican	Henry C. Minturn	41,691	29.3
Total votes		142,349	100.0
Democratic hold			

1986 United States House of Representatives elections in California
Party	Candidate	Votes	%
Democratic	Mervyn M. Dymally (Incumbent)	77,126	70.3
Republican	Jack McMurray	30,322	27.6
Peace and Freedom	B. Kwaku Duren	2,333	2.1
Total votes		109,781	100.0
Democratic hold			

1988 United States House of Representatives elections in California
Party	Candidate	Votes	%
Democratic	Mervyn M. Dymally (Incumbent)	100,919	71.6
Republican	Arnold C. May	36,017	25.5
Peace and Freedom	B. Kwaku Duren	4,091	2.9
Total votes		151,027	100.0
Democratic hold			

1990 United States House of Representatives elections in California
Party	Candidate	Votes	%
Democratic	Mervyn M. Dymally (Incumbent)	56,394	67.1
Republican	Eunice N. Sato	27,593	32.9
Total votes		83,987	100.0
Democratic hold			

== See also ==
- List of African-American United States representatives
- List of Asian Americans and Pacific Islands Americans in the United States Congress
- List of minority governors and lieutenant governors in the United States

Political offices
Preceded by John L. Harmer	Lieutenant Governor of California; 1975–1979	Succeeded by Mike Curb
U.S. House of Representatives
Preceded by Charles H. Wilson	Member of the U.S. House of Representatives from California's 31st congressional district 1981–1993	Succeeded by Matthew G. Martínez
Preceded by Mickey Leland	Chair of the Congressional Black Caucus; 1987–1989	Succeeded by Ron Dellums
