= Monoville, California =

Coordinates: 38°12′35″N 119°10′34″W

Monoville is a former settlement in Mono County, California, United States. It was located approximately 12 miles (19 km) south-southeast of Bridgeport.

In 1859, gold was discovered at Monoville. A conduit was constructed to divert water from Virginia Creek to aid hydraulic mining operations. This canal, termed the Mono Canal, was at its time the only such project in the county, and cost $75,000 to build.

A post office operated at Monoville from 1859 to 1862. At its peak, Monoville had a population over 1,000. The settlement was a supply location for prospectors who adventured beyond Monoville. By 1868, however, the town was abandoned and such buildings as remained were in ruins by neglect and lack or repair after heavy snowfalls. The downfall of Monoville also came about because of the promotion of nearby Aurora, Nevada.

== Notable person ==
- Tim N. Machin, Lieutenant Governor of California
