= Edwin Reinecke =

American politician (1924–2016)

Ed Reinecke
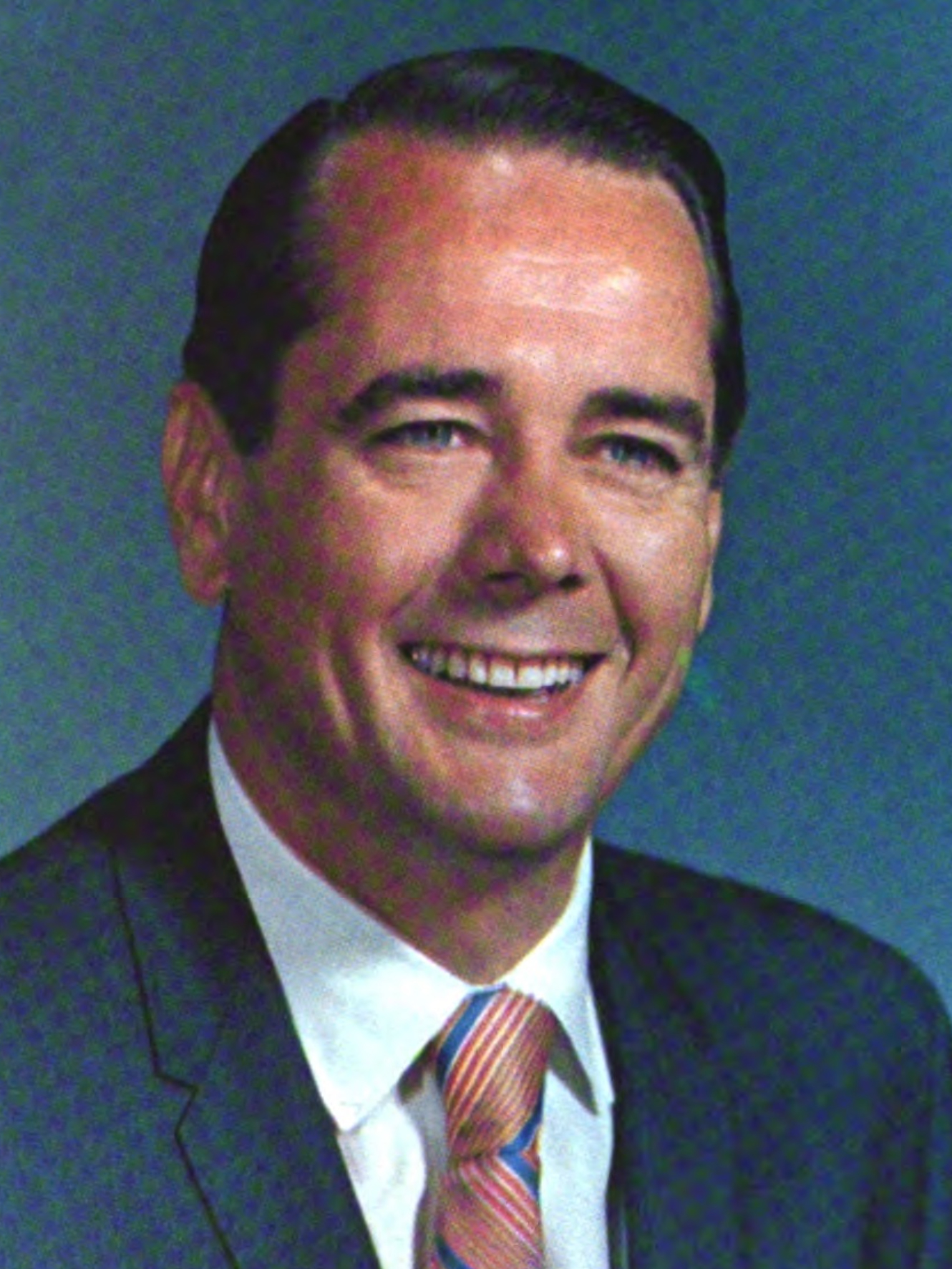
- Official portrait, 1971

39th Lieutenant Governor of California
- In office January 21, 1969 – October 2, 1974
- Governor: Ronald Reagan
- Preceded by: Robert Finch
- Succeeded by: John L. Harmer

13th Chair of the National Lieutenant Governors Association
- In office 1973–1974
- Preceded by: Martin J. Schreiber
- Succeeded by: Julian Carroll

Member of the U.S. House of Representatives from California's 27th district
- In office January 3, 1965 – January 21, 1969
- Preceded by: Everett G. Burkhalter
- Succeeded by: Barry Goldwater Jr.

Personal details
- Born: Howard Edwin Reinecke; January 7, 1924 Medford, Oregon, U.S.
- Died: December 24, 2016 (aged 92) Laguna Hills, California, U.S.
- Party: Republican
- Spouse: Jean Hrabec Mietus (m. 1967; died 2011)
- Children: 4
- Education: California Institute of Technology (BS)

Military service
- Allegiance: United States
- Branch/service: United States Navy
- Battles/wars: World War II

Howard Edwin "Ed" Reinecke (January 7, 1924 – December 24, 2016) was an American politician from California. He served three terms in the United States House of Representatives. He was the 39th lieutenant governor of California from 1969 until his resignation in 1974, in connection with a federal conviction for perjury.

== Early life and career ==
Reinecke was born in Medford, Oregon, and he graduated from Beverly Hills High School in 1942. He served in the Navy during World War II as a radioman. He attended the California Institute of Technology, from which he graduated in 1950 with a degree in mechanical engineering. Together with his sister (Charlotte) and two brothers (Fred and Bill), he founded FEBCO, a manufacturing company, in southern California.

== Political career ==
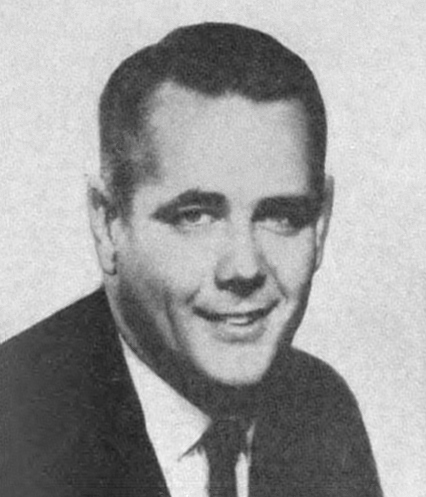
Reinecke as a Congressman.

Reinecke served in the U.S. House of Representatives between 1965 and 1969. As a member of the Interior Committee, he worked to preserve Western rivers (including the Colorado River, which was to be dammed within the Grand Canyon). During his tenure in Congress, he voted in favor of the Voting Rights Act of 1965. He voted for the initial House Resolution for the Civil Rights Act of 1968 but voted against the accepting the final Senate amendments to the Act.

In 1969, President Richard Nixon appointed California's Lieutenant Governor Robert Finch to be the U.S. Secretary of Health, Education and Welfare. To fill the vacancy, Governor Ronald Reagan appointed then-Congressman Reinecke as Lieutenant Governor on January 9, 1969. He was re-elected in 1970.

In 1974, Reinecke ran for the Republican nomination for Governor of California to succeed Reagan, who chose not to seek a third term. As part of the conservative wing of the Republican Party in contrast with the more moderate State Controller Houston Flournoy, he could expect a strong conservative turnout for the primary election. Early in the race, he held a lead over Flournoy. He had just earned the endorsement of the California Republican Assembly, a leading conservative group, when a Federal grand jury indicted him for perjury on April 3, 1974.

== Indictment and conviction ==
Reinecke's indictment was an offshoot of the investigation into the Watergate scandal. In 1972, he testified before the Senate during a confirmation hearing of Richard Kleindienst, the nominee for Attorney General. He was asked about an offer by Sheraton Hotels, a division of ITT Inc., which was the subject of a Federal antitrust investigation, to underwrite the 1972 Republican National Convention. Specifically, the committee wanted to know if he discussed the offer with then Attorney General John N. Mitchell (R) during the Watergate scandal, before or after ITT settled its case with the government. Reinecke told Senator Hiram Fong that the conversation took place after the settlement despite his earlier comment to a reporter that the conversation had taken place several months earlier.

Reinecke stayed in the race for governor, but was defeated by Flournoy, who went on to lose to Jerry Brown (D) in the general election. He was convicted of perjury in July 1974, but refused to resign until the state law required him to do so.

California law barred anyone convicted of perjury from holding office in the state; but the state attorney general ruled that this provision would not take effect until sentencing. On October 2, 1974, he was sentenced to an 18-month suspended term and resigned from office the same day.

On December 8, 1975, an appeals court overturned the ruling because "the Senate Judiciary Committee before which he was accused of perjuring himself had failed to publish its rule permitting a one-man quorum."

== Later life ==
Reinecke married Jean Hrabec, a former model who used the pseudonyms Jean Mills and Keith Kierrgan. The couple owned the Diamond R Ranch on Bucks Bar Road in Placerville, California. They were the first ranchers to import and breed Charolais cattle in El Dorado County, California. In 1981, they opened the restaurant "Zachary Jacques" known for prime rib and live musical entertainment. They also operated the brokerage firm, Reinecke Realty Residential.

== Death ==
Reinecke died of natural causes on Christmas Eve 2016, in Laguna Hills, California, at the age of 92.

== Electoral results ==
1964 United States House of Representatives elections in California
Party	Candidate	Votes	%
Republican	Edwin Reinecke	83,141	51.7
Democratic	Tom Bane	77,587	48.3
Total votes		160,734	100.0
Republican gain from Democratic			

1966 United States House of Representatives elections in California
Party	Candidate	Votes	%
Republican	Edwin Reinecke (Incumbent)	93,890	65.3
Democratic	John A. "Jack" Howard	49,785	34.7
Total votes		143,675	100.0
Republican hold			

1968 United States House of Representatives elections in California
Party	Candidate	Votes	%
Republican	Edwin Reinecke (Incumbent)	158,309	72.2
Democratic	John T. Butchko	60,808	27.8
Total votes		219,117	100.0
Republican hold			

== See also ==
- List of lieutenant governors of California
- List of American federal politicians convicted of crimes
- List of federal political scandals in the United States

U.S. House of Representatives
Preceded by Everett G. Burkhalter	Member of the U.S. House of Representatives from California's 27th congressional district 1965–1969	Succeeded by Barry Goldwater Jr.
Political offices
Preceded by Robert Finch	Lieutenant Governor of California; 1969–1974	Succeeded by John L. Harmer
