= 1986 California lieutenant gubernatorial election =

- November 4, 1986
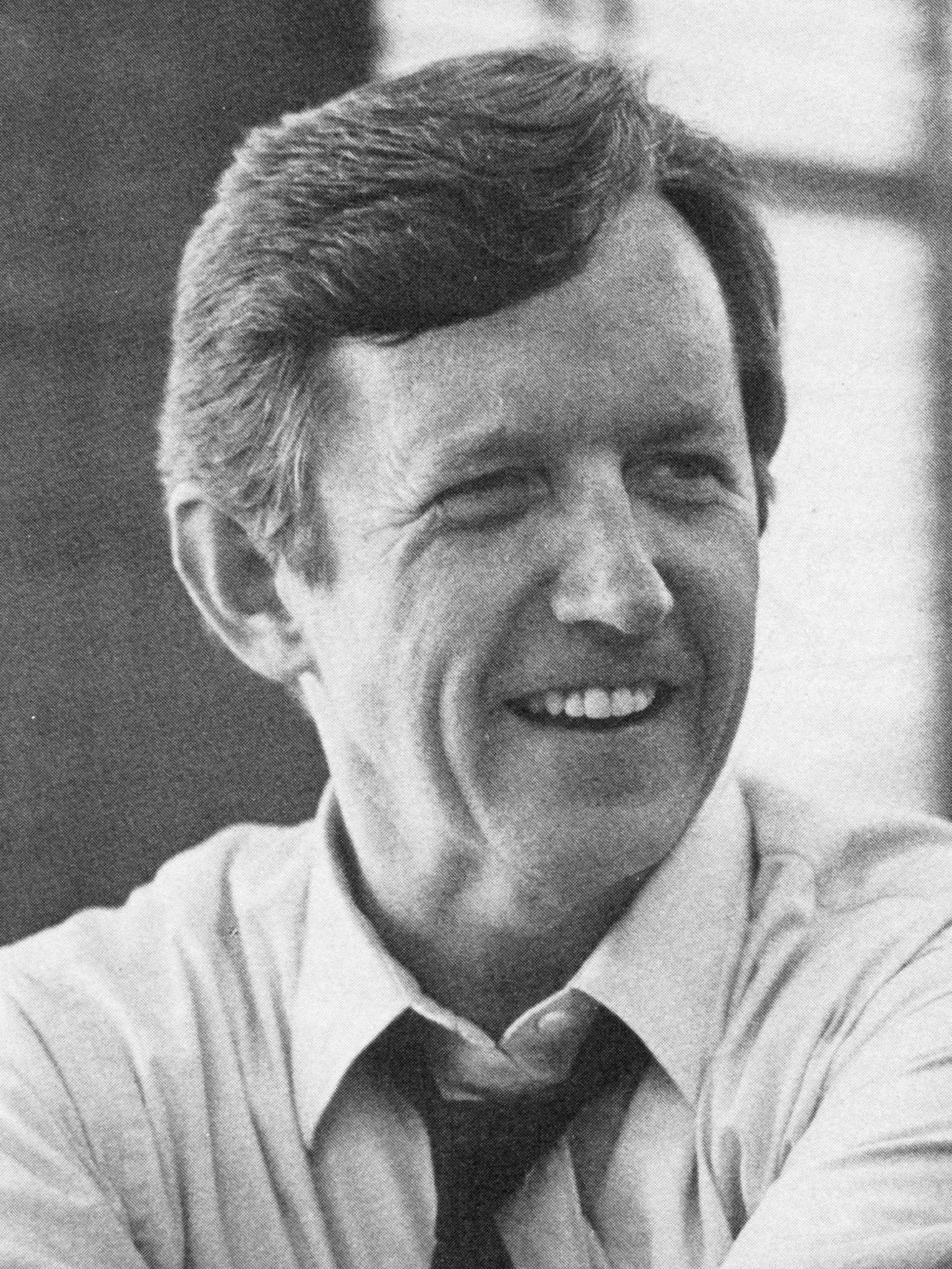

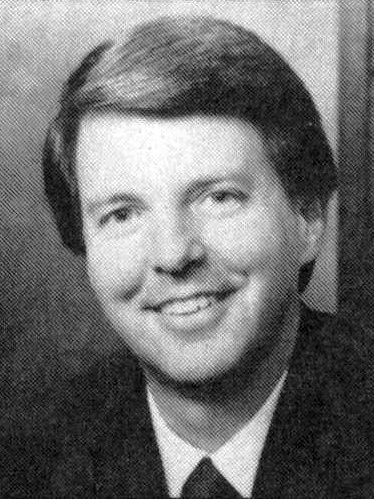
Nominee	Leo T. McCarthy	Mike Curb
Party	Democratic	Republican
Popular vote	3,957,831	3,118,758
Percentage	53.94%	42.50%
- County results McCarthy: 40–50% 50–60% 60–70% 70–80% Curb: 40–50% 50–60% 60–70%
Lieutenant Governor before election
Leo T. McCarthy
Democratic
Elected Lieutenant Governor
Leo T. McCarthy
Democratic

The 1986 California lieutenant gubernatorial election was held on November 4, 1986. Incumbent Democrat Leo T. McCarthy defeated Republican nominee, former Lieutenant Governor Mike Curb with 53.94% of the vote.

== Primary elections ==
Primary elections were held on June 3, 1986.

=== Republican primary ===
==== Candidates ====
- Mike Curb, former Lieutenant Governor
- H. L. Richardson, State Senator from Pasadena and nominee for U.S. Senate in 1974

==== Results ====
Republican primary results
Party	Candidate	Votes	%
Republican	Mike Curb	1,145,403	57.38
Republican	H. L. Richardson	850,896	42.62
Total votes		1,996,299	100.00

== General election ==
=== Candidates ===
Major party candidates

- Leo T. McCarthy, Democratic
- Mike Curb, Republican

Other candidates

- James C. Griffin, American Independent
- Norma Jean Almodovar, Libertarian
- Clyde Kuhn, Peace and Freedom

=== Results ===
1986 California lieutenant gubernatorial election
Party	Candidate	Votes	%	±%
Democratic	Leo T. McCarthy (incumbent)	3,957,831	53.94%	+1.73%
Republican	Mike Curb	3,118,758	42.50%	−1.62%
American Independent	James C. Griffin	104,480	1.42%	+0.38%
Libertarian	Norma Jean Almodovar	90,157	1.23%	−0.19%
Peace and Freedom	Clyde Kuhn	66,898	0.91%	−0.29%
Majority		839,073		
Turnout				
Democratic hold		Swing		
