= Tim N. Machin =

American politician (1822–1905)

10th Lieutenant Governor of California
- In office December 10, 1863 – December 5, 1867
- Governor: Frederick Low
- Preceded by: John F. Chellis
- Succeeded by: William Holden

14th Speaker of the California State Assembly
- In office January 1863 – April 1863
- Preceded by: George Barstow
- Succeeded by: William H. Sears

Member of the California State Assembly from the 12th district
- In office 1862–1863 Serving with C. W. Kendall, B. K. Davis (1862); Frederick Lux, Nelson M. Orr (1863)
- Preceded by: George W. Patrick, M. Y. Gillett, Fleming Amy, T. J. Chandler
- Succeeded by: Frederick Lux, Otis Perrin, E. F. Mitchell
- Constituency: Tuolumne and Mono counties

Personal details
- Born: Timothy Nostrand Machin; August 1822 Carlisle, New York, U.S.
- Died: December 20, 1905 (aged 83) Oakland, California, U.S.
- Party: Republican
- Children: 1
- Education: State and National Law School

Timothy N. Machin (August 1822 – December 20, 1905) was an American politician and attorney who served as the tenth lieutenant governor of California from 1863 to 1867. He previously served in the California State Assembly, representing Tuolumne and Mono counties for two terms in 1862 and 1863.

== Early life and education ==
Timothy Norstrand Machin (Also known as Tim N. Machin and T. N. Machin) was born in Carlisle, New York on August 22, 1822, a son of Nancy (McMichael) Machin and Thomas Norstrand Machin II, a brigadier general of militia and veteran of the War of 1812. His grandfather, Captain Thomas Machin, was the architect of the West Point Chain during the American Revolutionary War. He studied law at the State and National Law School in Ballston Spa, New York, where his fellow students included Niles Searls and Chancellor Hartson, who also became prominent in California legal and political circles.

== Career ==
After graduating from law school, Machin moved west and settled in Mono County, California, then Tuolumne County. In addition to practicing law, he was editor of the Democratic Age, a newspaper in Sonora.

While practicing law in Monoville, California, he was elected to the California State Assembly, representing Tuolumne and Mono counties, and serving from 1862 to 1863. In 1863, he was chosen speaker of the Assembly.

Staunchly pro-Union during the Civil War, he made many influential contacts in the Republican Party and its wartime successor, the Union party. In 1863, he received the nomination for lieutenant governor, running with Frederick Low on the Unionist ticket. He ran against E.W. McKinstrey, beating him by 21,120 votes. As lieutenant governor, he was selected to prosecute the impeachment proceedings instituted against a popular jurist, Judge Hardy. During his tenure he was appointed the Superintendent of San Quentin State Prison. He remained lieutenant governor through 1867.

After his retirement from politics, he made his home in the Clinton Park section of Oakland at 1276 Sixth Avenue.

== Personal life ==
Machin married Nancy M. Knight in San Francisco on April 15, 1864. They had one daughter, Elinor. He died in Oakland on December 20, 1905.
