= 1894 California lieutenant gubernatorial election =

- November 6, 1894
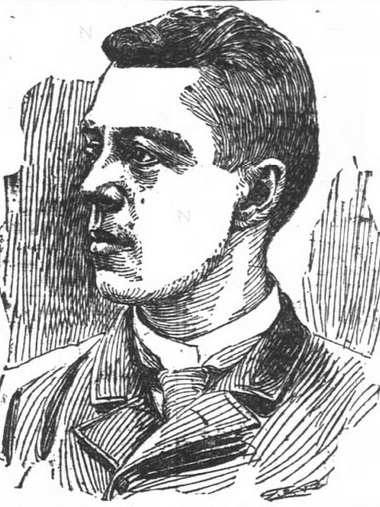

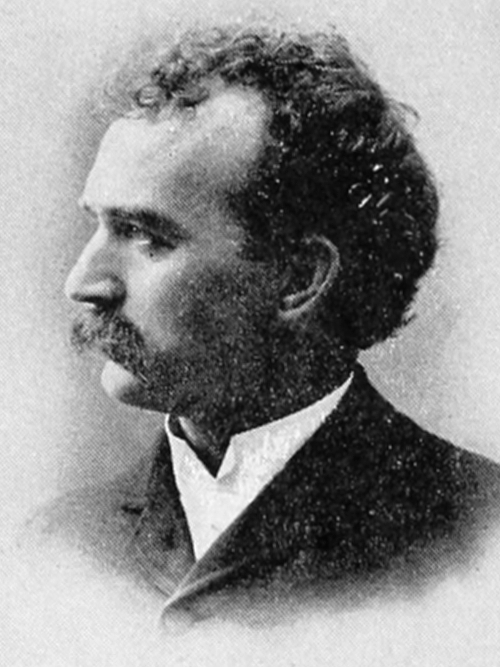

Nominee	Spencer G. Millard	William T. Jeter	A. J. Gregg
Party	Republican	Democratic	Populist
Popular vote	120,309	98,641	48,652
Percentage	43.22%	35.43%	17.48%
- County results Millard: 30–40% 40–50% 50–60% 70–80% Jeter: 30–40% 40–50% Gregg: 30–40%
Lieutenant Governor before election
John B. Reddick
Republican
Elected Lieutenant Governor
Spencer G. Millard
Republican

The 1894 California lieutenant gubernatorial election was held on November 6, 1894. Republican lawyer Spencer G. Millard defeated Democratic Santa Cruz Mayor William T. Jeter with 43.22% of the vote.

== General election ==
=== Candidates ===
- Spencer G. Millard, Republican
- William T. Jeter, Democratic
- A. J. Gregg, Populist
- Chauncey H. Dunn, Prohibition

=== Results ===
1906 California lieutenant gubernatorial election
Party	Candidate	Votes	%	±%
Republican	Spencer G. Millard	120,309	43.22%	
Democratic	William T. Jeter	98,641	35.43%	
Populist	A. J. Gregg	48,652	17.48%	
Prohibition	Chauncey H. Dunn	10,788	3.88%	
Majority		278,390		
Turnout				
Republican hold		Swing		
