= 1978 California lieutenant gubernatorial election =

- November 7, 1978
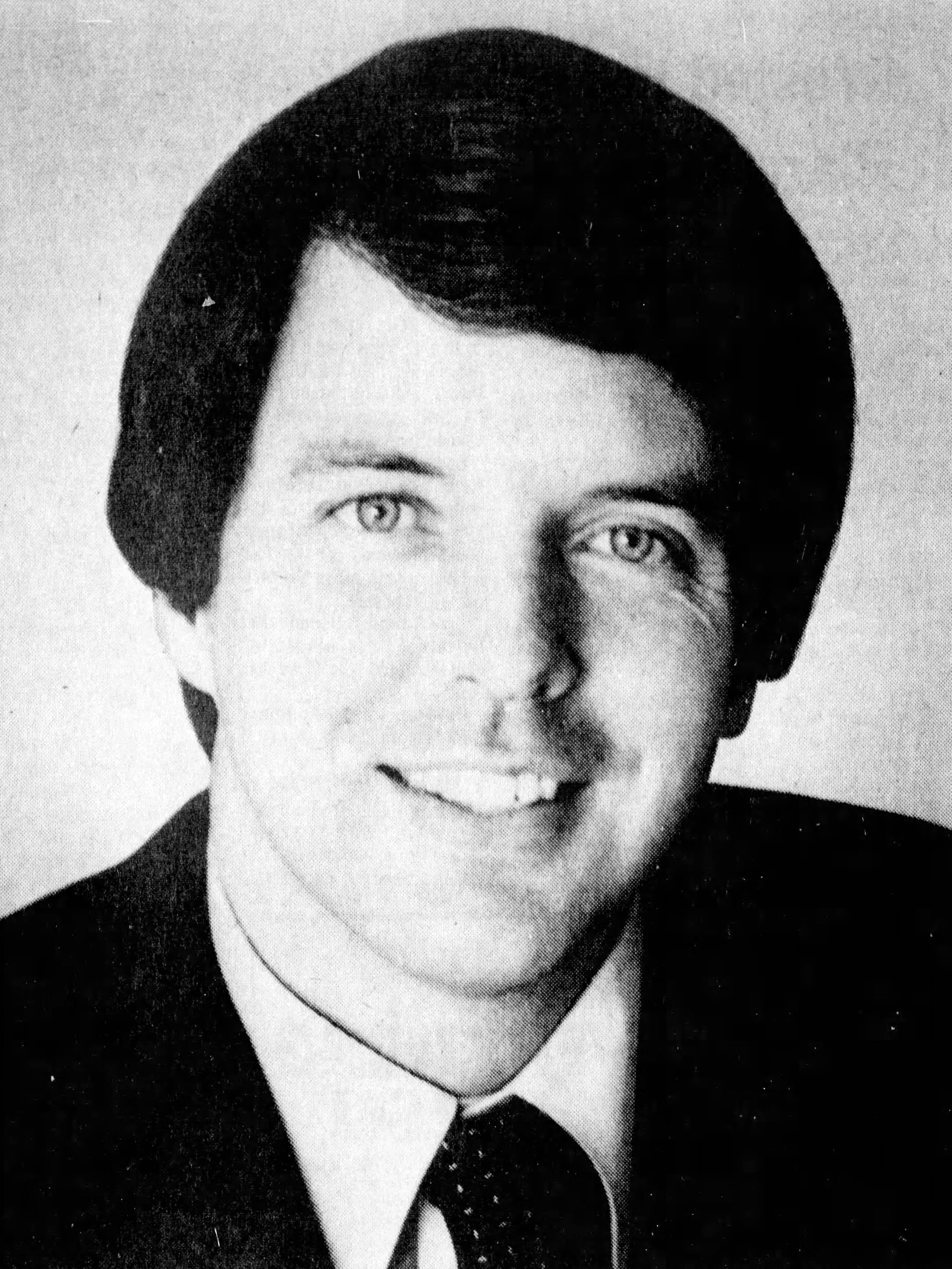

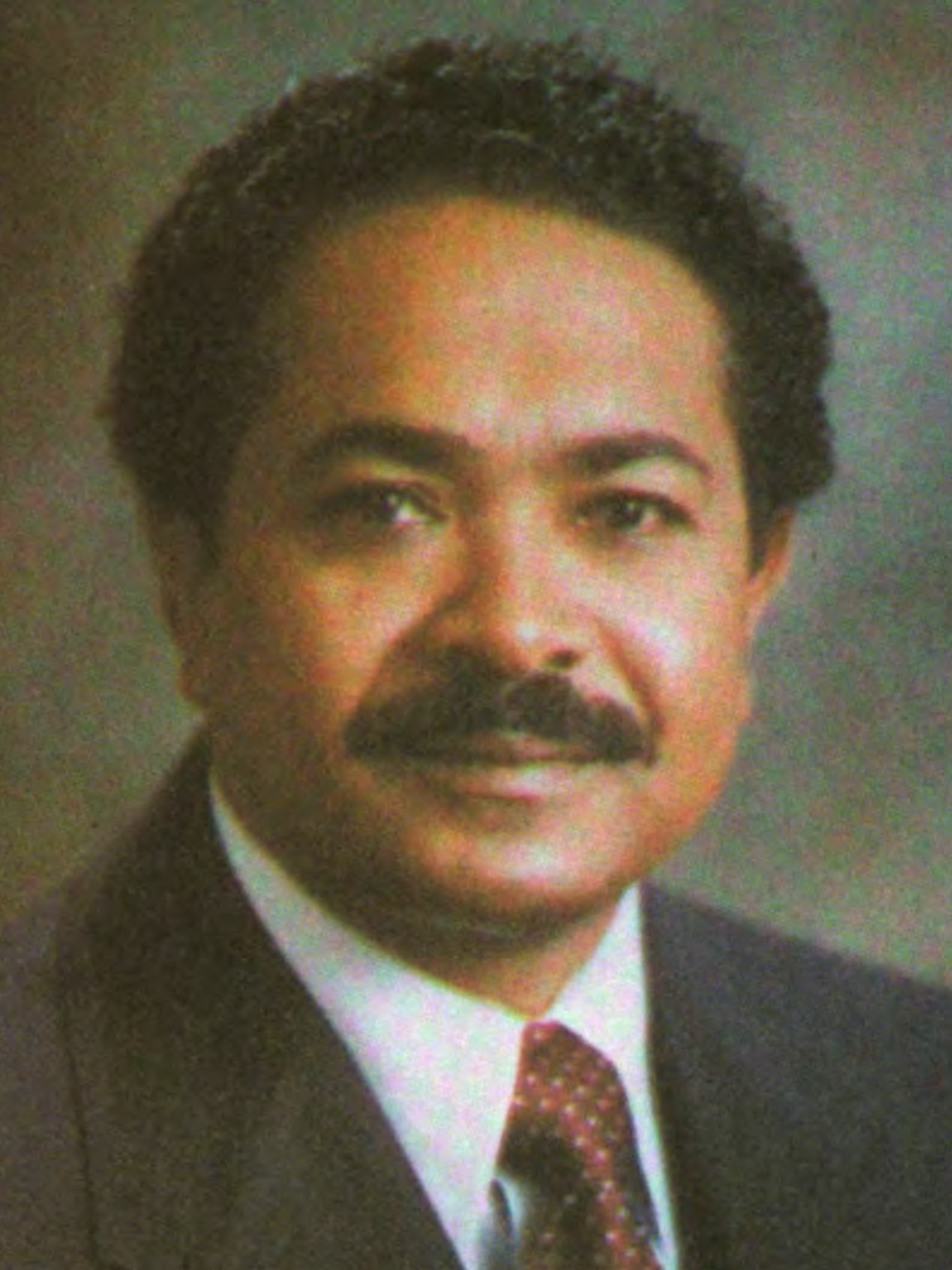
Nominee	Mike Curb	Mervyn Dymally
Party	Republican	Democratic
Popular vote	3,493,980	2,928,329
Percentage	51.64%	43.28%
- County results Curb: 40–50% 50–60% 60–70% Dymally: 40–50% 50–60%
Lieutenant Governor before election
Mervyn Dymally
Democratic
Elected Lieutenant Governor
Mike Curb
Republican

The 1978 California lieutenant gubernatorial election was held on November 7, 1978. Republican nominee Mike Curb defeated Democratic incumbent Mervyn Dymally with 51.64% of the vote. As of 2026, this was the last time a Republican was elected lieutenant governor of California.

== Primary elections ==
Primary elections were held on June 6, 1978.

=== Democratic primary ===
==== Candidates ====
- Mervyn Dymally, incumbent Lieutenant Governor
- Patricia E. "Penny" Raven
- Patrick Matthew Fitzpatrick
- Abe Tapia

==== Results ====
Democratic primary results
Party	Candidate	Votes	%
Democratic	Mervyn Dymally (incumbent)	1,749,227	55.33
Democratic	Patricia E. "Penny" Raven	686,157	21.71
Democratic	Patrick Matthew Fitzpatrick	551,896	17.46
Democratic	Abe Tapia	173,924	5.50
Total votes		3,161,204	100.00

=== Republican primary ===
==== Candidates ====
- Mike Curb, musician
- Michael D. Antonovich, State Assemblyman

==== Results ====
Republican primary results
Party	Candidate	Votes	%
Republican	Mike Curb	1,250,096	53.66
Republican	Michael D. Antonovich	1,079,587	46.34
Total votes		2,329,683	100.00

== General election ==
=== Candidates ===
Major party candidates

- Mike Curb, Republican
- Mervyn Dymally, Democratic

Other candidates

- Houston Myers, American Independent
- Jan B. Tucker, Peace and Freedom

=== Results ===
1978 California lieutenant gubernatorial election
Party	Candidate	Votes	%	±%
Republican	Mike Curb	3,493,980	51.64%	+5.32%
Democratic	Mervyn Dymally (incumbent)	2,928,329	43.28%	−5.91%
American Independent	Houston Myers	180,922	2.67%	+0.74%
Peace and Freedom	Jan B. Tucker	162,341	2.40%	−0.14%
Majority		565,651		
Turnout				
Republican gain from Democratic		Swing		
