= John L. Harmer =

American politician (1934–2019)

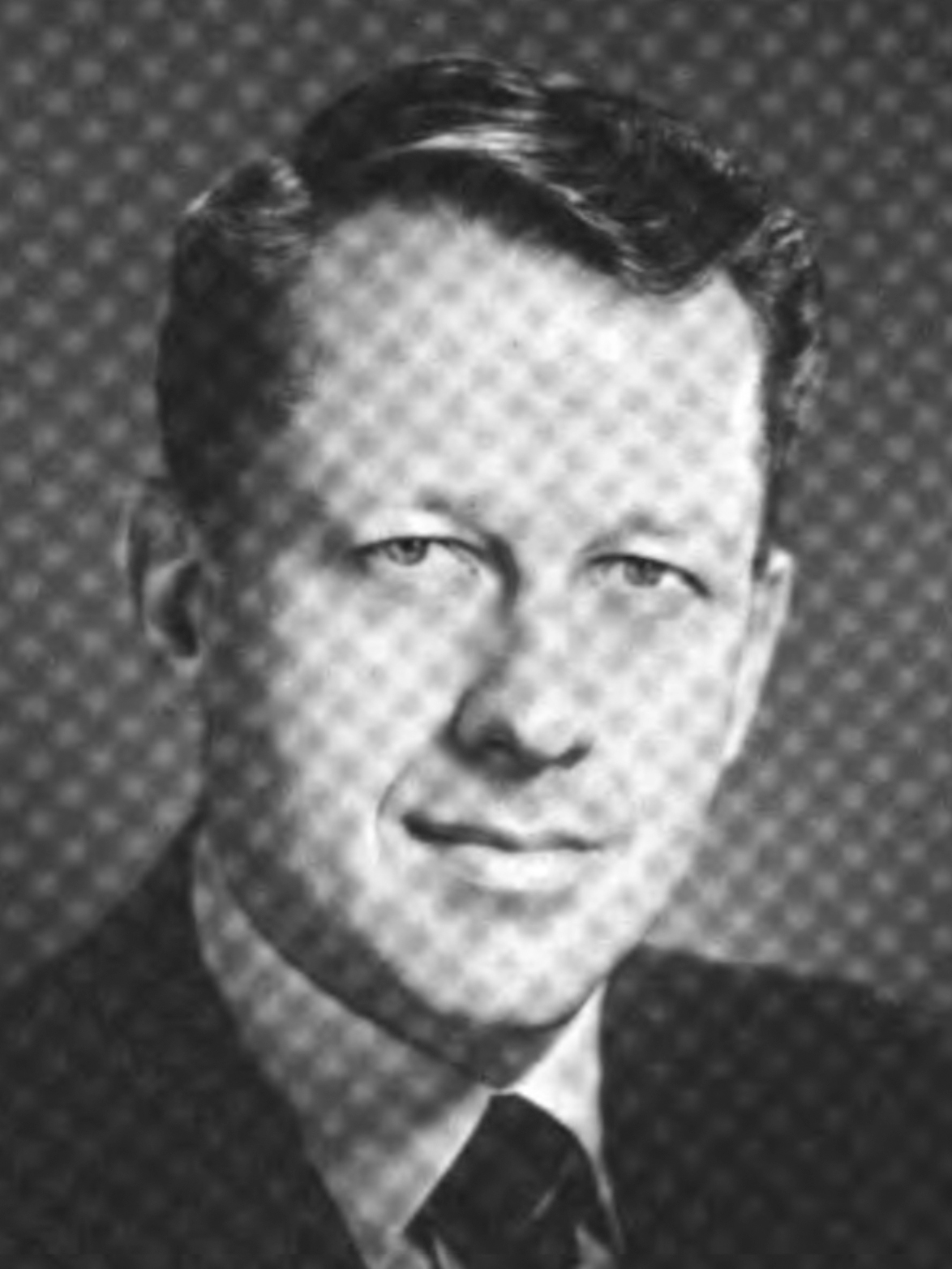
- Official portrait, 1971

40th Lieutenant Governor of California
- In office October 4, 1974 – January 6, 1975
- Governor: Ronald Reagan
- Preceded by: Edwin Reinecke
- Succeeded by: Mervyn Dymally

Member of the California Senate from the 21st district
- In office January 2, 1967 – October 4, 1974
- Preceded by: Richard J. Dolwig
- Succeeded by: Newton Russell

Personal details
- Born: April 28, 1934 Salt Lake City, Utah, U.S.
- Died: December 6, 2019 (aged 85) Bountiful, Utah, U.S.
- Party: Republican
- Spouse: Carolyn Jonas (m. 1960; died 2015)
- Children: 10
- Education: University of Utah; George Washington University
- Occupation: California State Senator, attorney

John Loren Harmer (April 28, 1934 – December 6, 2019) was an American politician who served in the California State Senate as a Republican from 1966 to 1974. Harmer served as the 40th lieutenant governor of California from 1974 to 1975. He was also the founder of the Lighted Candle Society and the author of several books. Harmer was also a member of the Church of Jesus Christ of Latter-day Saints.

== Early life ==
John L. Harmer was born in 1934 in Salt Lake City, Utah. His parents were Earl W. Harmer and Mabel Spande. He was one of their five children. Harmer attended the University of Utah. While there, Harmer was part of the Frosh Handbook committee in 1954, that helped inform new freshmen about college life at the university. They made sure freshmen were aware of school events and activities. He was involved with debate, and was an intramural debate finalist in 1954. Harmer was part of the Phi Eta Epsilon fraternity. He was also one of the school's Vigilantes. These vigilantes were campus policemen who played roles in student government. They were also responsible for being judges for school elections.

Harmer later obtained a law degree from George Washington University. Harmer was involved with the student court, serving as the Chief Justice of the student court in 1959. He married Carolyn Jonas on June 24, 1960, in the Los Angeles Temple and the couple had 10 children. Harmer was a member of the Church of Jesus Christ of Latter-day Saints. Throughout his life, Harmer has been interested in astronomy.

== Career ==
=== Republican Party ===
Harmer was a member of the Republican Party. He first entered politics by participating in Dwight D. Eisenhower's political campaign in 1952. He was later an aide to U.S. Senator Wallace Bennett hired through the U.S. Department of the Interior's Bureau of Land Management. After, Harmer worked as an attorney in Glendale, California. Before his election as a state senator, Harmer was also the director of public affairs with the National Association of Manufactures; he also worked for the Americans for Constitutional Action as a field representative. In 1966, Harmer was a member of the Republican State Central Committee, State Central Committee, United Republicans of California, as well as being part of California Republican Associates, Young Republicans, and Republican Associates. By this time, he had also founded the San Fernando Valley Business and Professional Association.

=== California State Senate ===
Harmer served in the California State Senate as a Republican from 1966 to 1974. He was first elected to the Senate for a two-year term in 1966, following a U.S. Supreme Court decision requiring states to reapportion the upper houses of their legislatures on the basis of population. Even-numbered districts elected their senators for full four-year terms in this election; as Harmer's district number was 21, he had to run again in 1968. He won and was re-elected in 1972.

During his time in the Senate, Harmer co-authored SB 462, the Therapeutic Abortion Act, along with Anthony Beilenson, Alan Short, and Lewis F. Sherman. This act permitted a physician or surgeon to perform an abortion in cases of rape or incest, or when doctors determined that the pregnancy "would gravely impair the physical or mental health" of the mother. He also was a regent of the University of California and served as a trustee of the California State University System. He chaired the Legislature Select Committee on Large Urban School Districts.

Harmer ran for state attorney general in 1970 and lost the primary; during that campaign, he sought permission to film a Los Angeles production of Oh! Calcutta! to gather evidence for a suit to prevent "irreparable damage to the morals of the community.".

In 1974 Harmer won the Republican primary for lieutenant governor. The incumbent, Republican Ed Reinecke, had run for governor instead of seeking re-election, but lost the gubernatorial primary after he was indicted for perjury in a Watergate scandal-related matter. When Reinecke was forced to resign as lieutenant governor on October 4, 1974, Governor Ronald Reagan appointed Harmer to fill the vacancy, allowing him to run as the incumbent in the upcoming general election. Harmer resigned from the state Senate and became California's 40th lieutenant governor. In that year dominated by Watergate, though, Harmer's candidacy may not have been helped by a reference to him as "one of the legislature's most conservative members.". On November 5, Harmer lost to Democratic nominee Mervyn M. Dymally (with whom Harmer had just recently served in the state Senate), 46.3%-49.2%. After just three months since his appointment, the term ended and Harmer left the lieutenant governor's office on January 6, 1975.

He ran for the United States Senate in 1976, but lost the primary, receiving only 8.5% of the vote.

=== Other contributions ===
He and his family moved to Bountiful, Utah in 1980 and later moved to Lindon, Utah. In Utah, Harmer was appointed the chairman of the National Center for Constitutional Studies. He also worked as a private attorney. He fought to eliminate indecency on cable television programs. In 1988, he was appointed chairman of Eyring, Inc.

In 1999, Harmer traveled to Moscow, Russia as an attorney and was briefed in the U.S. Embassy on the Soviet Union's plans to use germ warfare against the U.S. in the 1970s and 1980s. This experience influenced him to write the book Ere His Floods of Anger Flow.

Harmer became vice president of Geely-USA, the American Division of the Chinese car maker Geely that along with Chery is one of the first Chinese automobile manufacturers to export to North American shores. Harmer founded the Lighted Candle Society in 2001. He served as chairman of the Lighted Candle Society, an organization opposed to pornography, and has filed briefs with the United States Supreme Court against pornography.

Harmer authored several books including We Dare Not Fail (1968), Among the Living Are the Dead (1970), and The Sex Industrial Complex (2007). He also wrote Reagan: Man of Principle.

Political offices
Preceded by Edwin Reinecke	Lieutenant Governor of California; 1974–1975	Succeeded by Mervyn M. Dymally
