= Mike Curb =

42nd Lieutenant Governor of California (born 1944)

Michael Curb
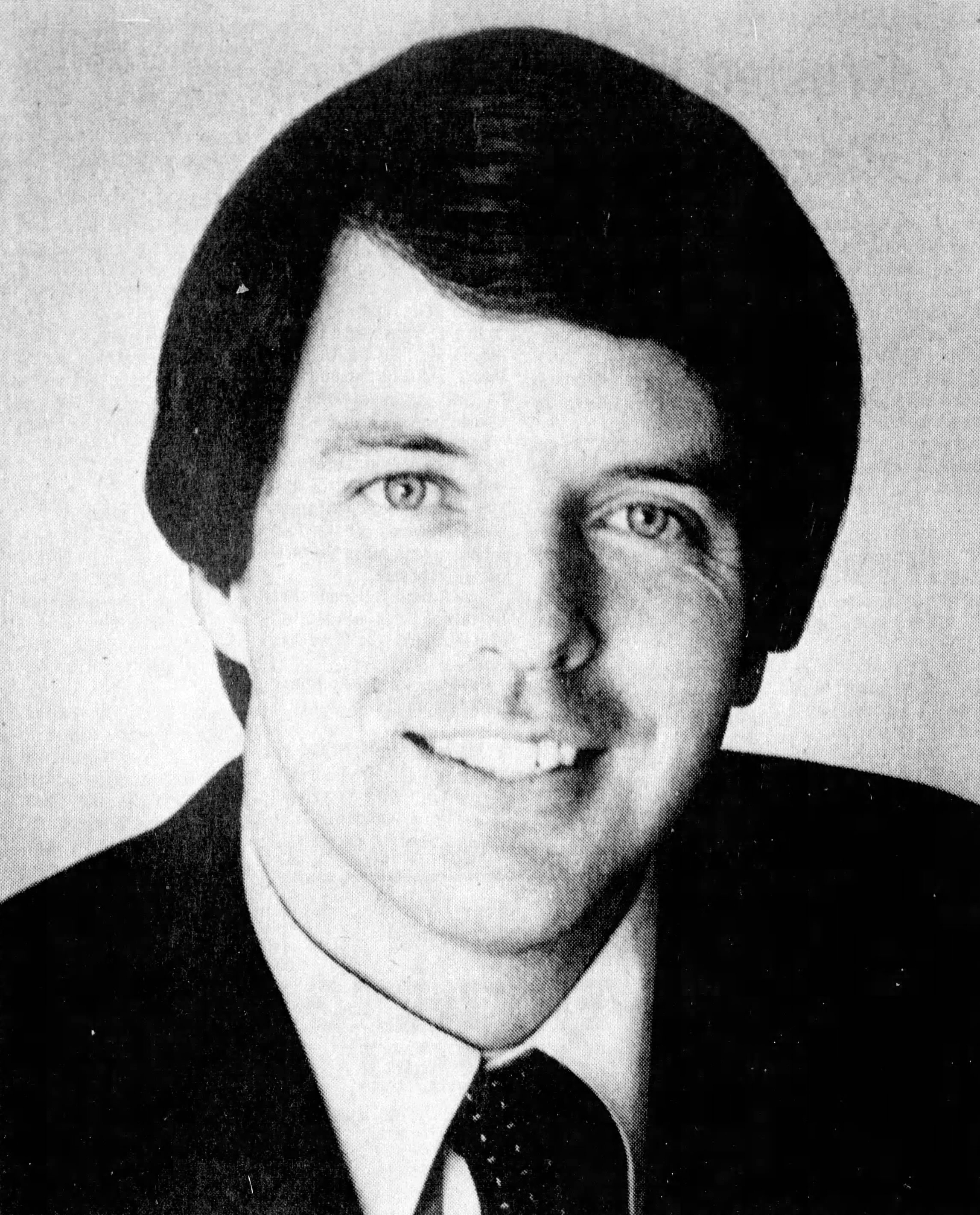
- Curb c. 1978

42nd Lieutenant Governor of California
- In office January 8, 1979 – January 3, 1983
- Governor: Jerry Brown
- Preceded by: Mervyn Dymally
- Succeeded by: Leo T. McCarthy

22nd Chair of the National Lieutenant Governors Association
- In office 1981–1982
- Preceded by: Charles S. Robb
- Succeeded by: Martha Layne Collins

Personal details
- Born: Michael Charles Curb; December 24, 1944 (age 81) Savannah, Georgia, U.S.
- Party: Republican
- Spouse: Linda Dunphy Curb (m. 1978)
- Education: California State University, Northridge

Michael Charles Curb (born December 24, 1944) is an American politician, record executive, and philanthropist who served as the 42nd lieutenant governor of California from 1979 to 1983. He is the founder of Curb Records and is the chairman of Word Entertainment. He was inducted into the West Coast Stock Car Hall of Fame in 2006. A member of the Republican Party, Curb is the most recent Republican to have been elected lieutenant governor of California as of 2026.

== Early life and education ==
Curb was born in Savannah, Georgia, to Charles McCloud Curb and Stella "Stout" Curb. He grew up in Southern California's San Fernando Valley. He has one sister. After attending Grant High School, he attended San Fernando Valley State College (now California State University, Northridge). His maternal grandmother was of Mexican heritage.

== Career ==
=== Music ===
At the age of 18 in 1963, Curb formed Sidewalk Records through which he had helped start the careers of multiple West Coast rock and roll artists. In 1969, his company merged with MGM Records. He became president of both MGM Records and Verve Records, which then formed Curb Records.

Curb scored the music for the short film Skaterdater (1965) as well as The Wild Angels (1966), Thunder Alley (1967), Devil's Angels (1967), The Born Losers (1967) (the first of the Billy Jack films), Maryjane (1968), The Wild Racers (1968), The Savage Seven (1968), The Big Bounce (1969), The Sidehackers (1969) and Black Water Gold (1970). Curb has composed or supervised more than 50 film scores and written over 400 songs.

In 1969, he co-wrote a new theme for the TV series American Bandstand; the theme was used until 1974.

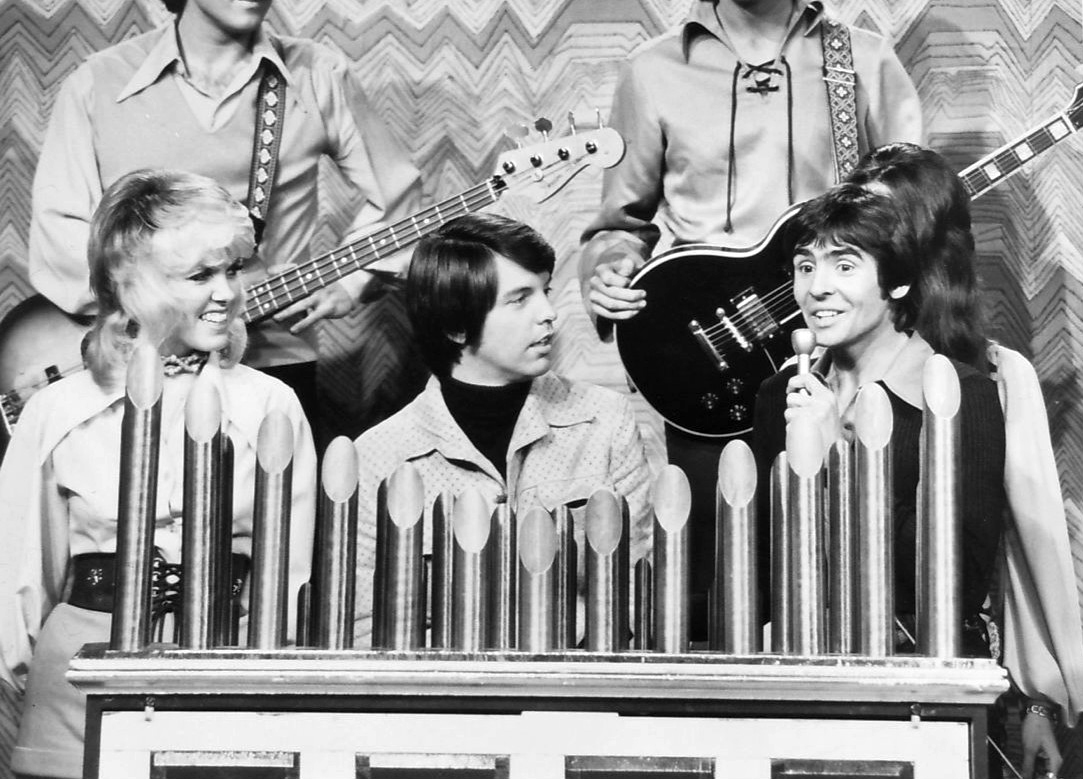
Curb (center) with members of the Mike Curb Congregation and Davy Jones on a television special in 1972

Curb had a Top 40 pop song in early 1971. Its title was the same as that of his album, Burning Bridges, which was written by Lalo Schifrin and Mike Curb. The song was used as the theme of Brian G. Hutton's film Kelly's Heroes, which starred Clint Eastwood. The song reached No. 1 on South Africa’s Springbok Radio Chart.

Curb's group, the Mike Curb Congregation, had the adult contemporary song "Sweet Gingerbread Man", from the film The Magic Garden of Stanley Sweetheart, on music charts in 1970. Also in 1970, they performed "I Was Born In Love With You", the theme song of Wuthering Heights, and the title song for the Frank Sinatra film Dirty Dingus Magee. The group was featured on Sammy Davis Jr.'s No. 1 Billboard Hot 100 hit of 1972, "The Candy Man" (the Aubrey Woods version was featured in the film Willy Wonka & the Chocolate Factory). The group collaborated with the Sherman Brothers on the song "It's a Small World", which reached the Billboard AC Top Ten in 1973. They sang backup on Jud Strunk's 1973 hit "Daisy a Day". The group was featured regularly on Glen Campbell's CBS television show.

In 1969, Curb signed Christian rock pioneer Larry Norman, DeGarmo & Key, 2nd Chapter of Acts, and Debby Boone – artists considered to be the earliest contemporary Christian music artists. Curb wrote and produced music for the Hanna-Barbera animated series Cattanooga Cats. The theme for the cartoon series Hot Wheels is credited to Mike Curb and the Curbstones.

In the 1970s, Curb wrote and produced for Roy Orbison, Marie Osmond and the Osmond Family, Lou Rawls, Sammy Davis Jr. and Solomon Burke. He also signed artists such as the Sylvers, Eric Burdon, War, Richie Havens, the Five Man Electrical Band, Gloria Gaynor, Johnny Bristol, Exile, the Four Seasons, the Mob and the Dutch singer Heintje Simons to his labels.

Curb ran a short-lived country music subsidiary label for Motown called Hitsville Records. He co-wrote the lyrics for "It Was a Good Time". He received BMI awards for writing "Burning Bridges" for Clint Eastwood's Kelly's Heroes, and for writing "All for the Love of Sunshine".

Curb served as chairman of the Inaugural Youth Concert for President Richard Nixon's second term on January 20, 1973. He enlisted many artists from MGM Records as well as others to perform for the historic event. Solomon Burke, the Mob, Jimmy Osmond, Tommy Roe, Ray Stevens, the Sylvers, the Don Costa Orchestra, and Laurie Lea Schaefer were on the stage for the young audience. He served as emcee for the program.

In 2021, Fisk Jubilee Singers won Grammy awards for Celebrating Fisk! (The 150th Anniversary Album) under the Best Roots Gospel Album category. The album was produced for Curb Records: Mike Curb and Paul Kwami won a Grammy Award.

Curb Records marked its 60th anniversary in 2023, with Mike Curb still at the helm. Over the years, Curb Records has been home to Wynonna Judd, Tim McGraw, LeAnn Rimes, Hal Ketchum, Hank Williams Jr., the Judds, Lyle Lovett, Natalie Grant, Ray Stevens, Rodney Atkins, Jo Dee Messina, Sawyer Brown, Lee Brice, Dylan Scott, Hannah Ellis, Harper Grace and For King & Country.

=== MGM anti-drug controversy ===
In 1970, Billboard reported that Curb, as president of MGM Records, fired eighteen acts for what Curb believed was their promotion of hard drugs in their songs. Curb said, "Drug groups are the cancer of the industry. Their effect on young people who are their fans or followers is devastating. When they appear smashed out of their minds and describe musically a great experience they had on LSD, they are glorifying hard drugs. I credit hard drug record acts with hundreds and hundreds of new young drug users."

Curb has always disputed that any acts were dropped from MGM only for drug-related reasons. Billboard reported that Curb was alarmed by the drug-related deaths of Janis Joplin, Jimi Hendrix, and Alan Wilson of Canned Heat. Among the musicians incorrectly thought to be included in a 1969 drug related purge were the Velvet Underground and Frank Zappa's group the Mothers of Invention. Zappa spoke out against drug use throughout his career and, by early 1969, had fulfilled his MGM/Verve contract and moved to his own Bizarre Records label, distributed by Warner Bros. The Velvet Underground had already left the label by then to sign with Atlantic Records, who released their fourth studio album, Loaded. Also, when Eric Burdon, who was an advocate of psychedelics, dared Curb to release him from his contract although he was his biggest selling artist, Curb acquiesced. Burdon also launched a campaign—by distributing bumper stickers—called Curb the Clap.

Curb claimed industry support, and the record company official he cited was Bill Gallagher, the president of Paramount Records. Columbia Records president Clive Davis said Curb was "grandstanding", and that his anti-drug stance had made him "a minor hero of the Nixon administration." In 1997, Curb stated the affair had happened at a time when "you were considered a freak if you spoke out against drugs."

=== Political career ===
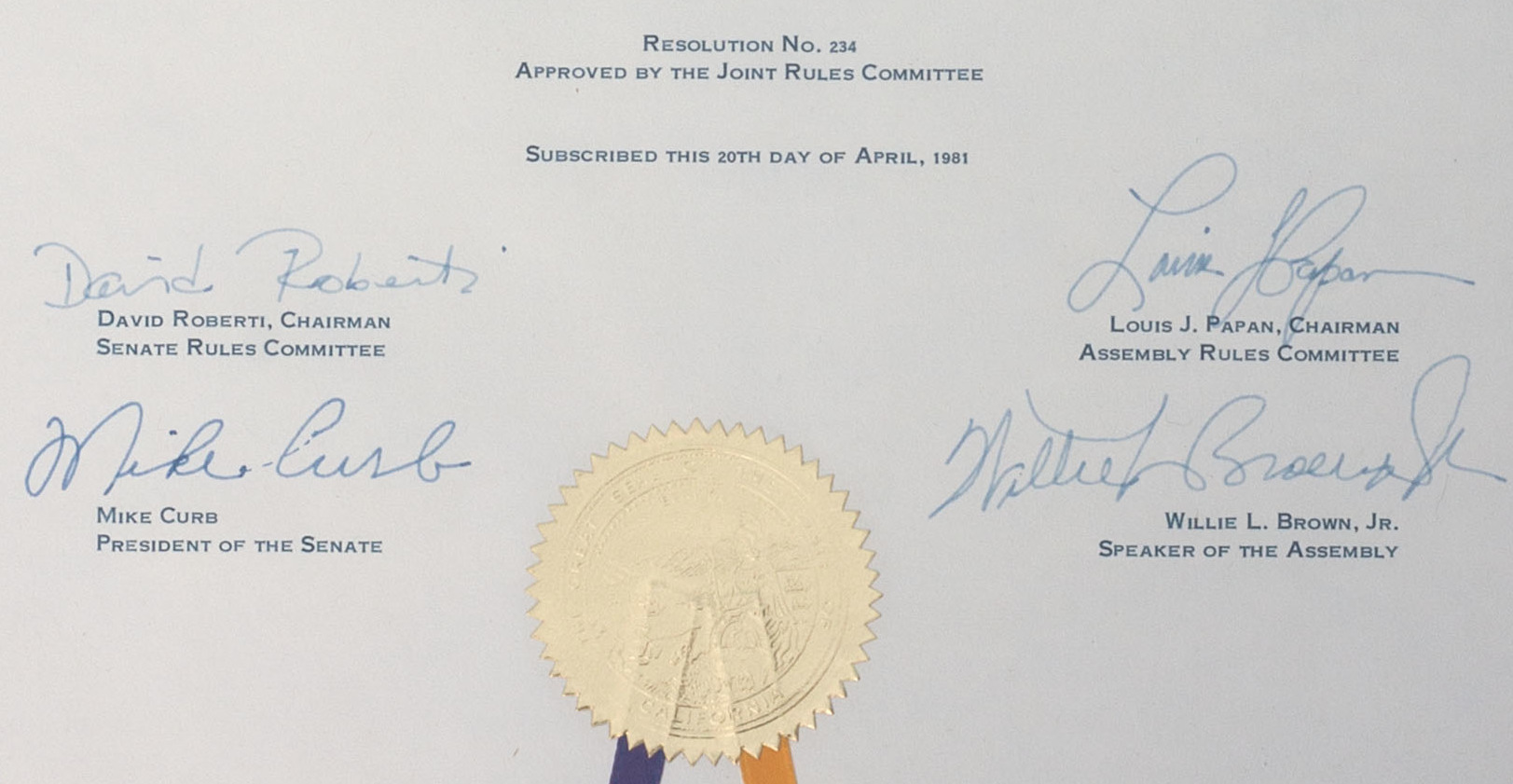
Signatures from a resolution signed by Curb in his ceremonial role of president of the California State Senate

Encouraged to enter politics in part by former Governor of California (and future President of the United States) Ronald Reagan, Curb was elected lieutenant governor of California in 1978, defeating the incumbent Democrat, Mervyn M. Dymally. Democratic candidate Jerry Brown was re-elected governor in the same year. During much of 1979–1980, when Brown was out of the state campaigning to become the Democratic presidential candidate, Curb was acting governor, vetoing legislation, issuing executive orders, and making appointments. According to the December 28, 1979, edition of the San Francisco Chronicle, "...the California Supreme Court ruled yesterday that when the governor is out of state, the lieutenant governor is free to exercise all powers of the chief executive...".

Curb worked with liberal Democrat Harvey Milk on the campaign against the Briggs Initiative, a 1978 ballot initiative that would have banned gays and lesbians from working in public schools. Curb persuaded Reagan to oppose the initiative, and it was defeated. Curb continues to support LGBT rights; in 2023, Curb achieved a major victory in his challenge to Tennessee Governor Bill Lee, where the court declared it unconstitutional to force private businesses to post discriminatory LGBT signs.

In 1982, Curb lost the Republican gubernatorial nomination to California Attorney General George Deukmejian. Deukmejian would go on to narrowly win the general election. In 1986, Curb ran again for lieutenant governor as the Republican nominee against the incumbent Democrat, Leo T. McCarthy, losing a bitterly contested race, largely run on the issue of punishment for drug trafficking and violent crimes. A vocal opponent of drug use, Curb advocated extension of the death penalty to include drug pushers whose narcotics trafficking resulted in a death. As of 2026, Curb is the last Republican to have been elected to Lieutenant Governor of California; Republican Abel Maldonado assumed the office in 2010 after being appointed by then-Governor Arnold Schwarzenegger to fill a vacancy when the Lieutenant Governor, John Garamendi, resigned to take a seat in the United States House of Representatives, but then lost the subsequent election in 2010 for a full-term to the Democratic candidate, San Francisco mayor and later future Governor Gavin Newsom.

In 1980, Curb was co-chairman of Ronald Reagan's successful presidential campaign. Curb was also chairman of the convention program in Detroit and was later appointed by Reagan to be chairman of the national finance committee.

=== Involvement in car racing ===
A motorsport enthusiast, Curb is a co-owner of the Curb Agajanian Performance Group, a team that has won ten national championships. His sponsorship and ownership have included three of NASCAR's most celebrated drivers. He owned Richard Petty's famed No. 43 car in 1984 and 1985, during which Petty achieved his 199th and 200th career wins. Curb was also a sponsor for Dale Earnhardt during his 1980 Winston Cup championship winning season, and sponsored Darrell Waltrip's No. 12 Toyota Tundra in the Craftsman Truck Series, driven by Joey Miller in 2006. Curb-Agajanian also ran cars for many years in the Indianapolis 500, including for Dan Wheldon and Alexander Rossi, with whom he won the 2011 and 2016 Indianapolis 500s respectively. Curb was the co-owner with Richard Childress of the No. 98 Chevrolet driven by Austin Dillon.

Curb was the only car owner to win in all 10 NASCAR auto racing series in the United States – the NASCAR Cup Series, the Xfinity Series (formerly the Nationwide series and Busch Series), the Craftsman Truck Series (formerly the Gander Outdoors Truck Series and Camping World Truck Series), the Grand-Am Rolex Daytona Prototype National Sports Car Series (now the IMSA SportsCar Championship merged with American Le Mans), the IMSA GT Series (formerly IMSA Camel GT), Continental Series (formerly IMSA GTS), the Late Model All American Series, the Modifieds and the K&N East and West Series.

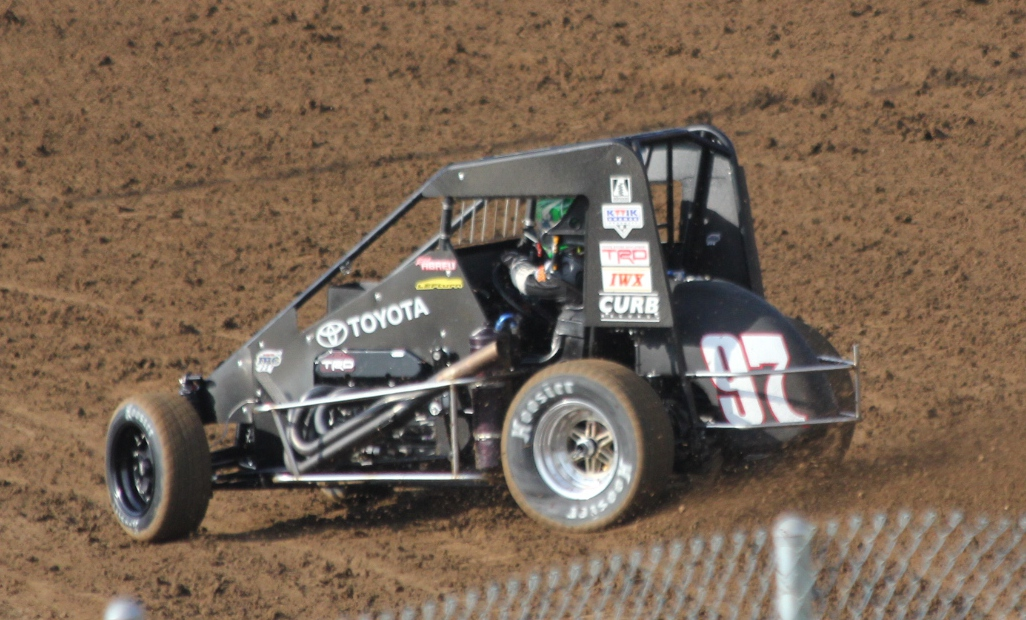
Rico Abreu's 2014 USAC Midget car

Curb is also a long-time sponsor of ThorSport Racing in the Truck Series, as part-owner of the team's No. 98 Ford driven by Ty Majeski. He maintained a similar partnership with Phil Parsons Racing in the Cup Series, which also ran the No. 98. Parsons drivers Christopher Bell and Rico Abreu won the 2013 and 2014 USAC National Midget tours.

=== Elvis House ===
In 2006, Curb purchased a house at 1034 Audubon Drive, Memphis, which was once owned by Elvis Presley. Curb renovated the house and turned it over to the Mike Curb Institute at Rhodes College.

=== Philanthropy and honors ===
In Nashville, Curb has become a civic leader and benefactor of Belmont University, where his donation toward the construction of a new arena resulted in it being named the Curb Event Center. The university includes the Mike Curb College of Entertainment and Music Business. Curb endowed the Curb Center and the Curb Creative Campus program at Vanderbilt University and the Mike Curb Institute of Music at Rhodes College in Memphis. In 2024, he made the largest ever donation to Belmont, contributing $58 million to expand the Curb College's presence on Music Row.

In 2001, Curb was inducted into the Junior Achievement U.S. Business Hall of Fame. Curb was inducted into the Georgia Music Hall of Fame in 2003 and the North Carolina Music Hall of Fame in 2009.

In August 2006, Curb pledged $10 million to California State University, Northridge (CSUN) (in Los Angeles) to endow his alma mater's arts college and provide a lead gift for the university's regional performing arts center. Of the $10 million gift, $5 million supported CSUN's College of Arts, Media, and Communication, one of the university's largest colleges that offers degree and certificate programs for more than 4,400 students. Of the gift, $4 million went into a general endowment for the college, and $1 million endowed a faculty chair specializing in music industry studies. As a result, the college was named in his honor. Studies within the Mike Curb College of Arts, Media, and Communication include Media, Arts, Music, Business, Journalism, and Communication Studies.

On June 29, 2007, Curb was honored with the 2,341st star on the Hollywood Walk of Fame.

CSU Channel Islands dedicated the Mike Curb Studio in Napa Hall at the Camarillo, California campus on October 21, 2010. The studio is a post-production and film and video production facility.

In 2014, Curb was inducted into the Musicians Hall of Fame and Museum in Nashville, Tennessee and in 2016, he was inducted into the Tennessee Sports Hall of Fame. He was awarded Ray Fox Memorial Award of Living Legends of Auto Racing in Daytona in 2017. In 2018, Racers Reunion featured him in Men Who Changed Racing with Harry Miller and Sam Nunis. Curb was inducted to North Carolina Music Hall of Fame in the same year for his "contributions and support of the Hall of Fame". In 2019, Curb received the National Centennial Leadership Award from Junior Achievement.

==== Mike Curb Foundation ====
The Mike Curb Foundation is a private philanthropic organization established by Mike Curb in 1998. Since its founding, the foundation has contributed over $200 million in grants to advance education, the arts, cultural preservation, and community initiatives.

In 2012, the Mike Curb Foundation made a donation to the UCLA Herb Alpert School of Music to establish a computer music laboratory. In 2025, it provided additional funding for a full renovation of the space, which was renamed the Mike Curb Student Recording Facility at the Evelyn and Mo Ostin Music Center.

At Belmont University, the foundation contributed a $58 million lead gift supporting a two-phase expansion of the Mike Curb College of Entertainment and Music Business on Nashville’s Music Row. The first phase, completed in 2025, opened 17,000 square feet of new facilities, including songwriting rooms, listening spaces, live-sound classrooms, and student lounges. The second phase is planned to add 71,900 square feet of additional space.

The foundation also established the Mike Curb Institute for Music at Rhodes College in 2006. The institute was recognized by Billboard in 2023 as one of the top music business schools for its curriculum and industry partnerships. In 2020, the foundation made a major gift to Daytona State College, endowing naming rights for the Curb Center to support programs preparing students for careers in the music industry.

== Discography ==
=== Albums ===
| Year | Album | US |
|---|---|---|
| 1970 | Come Together | 105 |
| 1970 | Sweet Gingerbread Man | 185 |
| 1971 | Burning Bridges and Other Motion Picture Themes | 117 |
| 1971 | Put Your Hand in the Hand | 205 |
| 1972 | Softly Whispering I Love You | 206 |
| 1972 | Song for a Young Love | -- |
| 1973 | It's a Small World | Unreleased (test pressings exist, MGM SE-4900) |

=== Collaboration albums ===
| Year | Album | US Country |
|---|---|---|
| 1971 | All for the Love of Sunshine (with Hank Williams, Jr.) | 10 |
| 1972 | Great Balls of Fire | |

=== Singles ===
| Year | Single | Peak chart positions | | | | | |
| Year | Single | US AC | US | CA | AU | NZ | SA |
|---|---|---|---|---|---|---|---|
| 1970 | "Burning Bridges" | 16 | 34 | 40 | 12 | 1 | 1 |
| 1971 | "Sweet Gingerbread Man" | 16 | 115 | 95 | — | — | — |
| 1972 | "See You in September" | 15 | 108 | — | — | — | — |
| 1973 | "It's a Small Small World" | 9 | 108 | — | — | — | — |

=== Guest singles ===
| Year | Single | Peak chart positions | | | | | | Album |
| Year | Single | US Country | US | US AC | CAN Country | CAN | CAN AC | Album |
|---|---|---|---|---|---|---|---|---|
| 1970 | "All for the Love of Sunshine" (with Hank Williams Jr.) | 1 | — | — | 1 | — | — | All for the Love of Sunshine |
| 1970 | "Rainin' in My Heart" (with Hank Williams Jr.) | 3 | 108 | — | 2 | — | — | All for the Love of Sunshine |
| 1971 | "Ain't That a Shame" (with Hank Williams Jr.) | 7 | — | — | 16 | — | — | Hank Williams, Jr.'s Greatest Hits Vol. II |
| 1972 | "Living Together, Growing Together" (with Tony Bennett) | — | 111 | — | — | — | — | single only |
| 1972 | "The Candy Man" (with Sammy Davis Jr.) | — | 1 | 1 | — | — | — | single only |
| 1972 | "The People Tree" (with Sammy Davis Jr.) | — | 92 | 16 | — | — | — | single only |
| 1973 | "Long Haired Lover From Liverpool" (with Jimmy Osmond) | — | 38 | — | — | — | — | single only (#1 in UK) |
| 1976 | "Sing My Love Song" (with Al Martino) | — | — | 24 | — | — | — | single only |

== See also ==
- List of minority governors and lieutenant governors in the United States

Political offices
| Preceded by Mervyn M. Dymally | Lieutenant Governors of California; 1979–1983 | Succeeded by Leo T. McCarthy |
