= Samuel Purdy =

American politician (1819–1882)

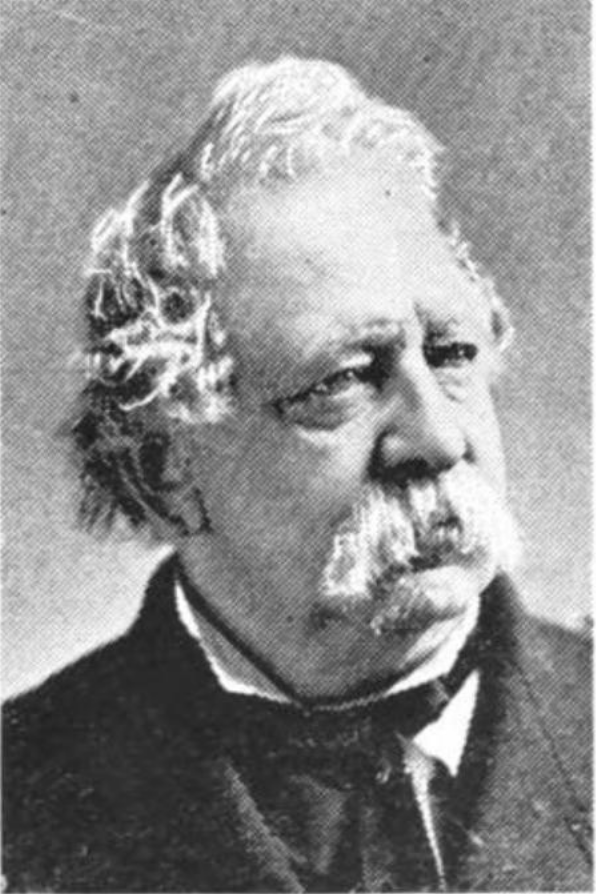

3rd Lieutenant Governor of California
- In office January 8, 1852 – January 9, 1856
- Governor: John Bigler
- Preceded by: David C. Broderick (Acting)
- Succeeded by: Robert M. Anderson

1st Mayor of Stockton, California
- In office October 5, 1850 – 1851
- Preceded by: Position established
- Succeeded by: John C. Edwards

Personal details
- Born: 1819 New York City, US
- Died: February 17, 1882 (aged 64) San Francisco, California, US
- Party: Democratic
- Children: 7
- Occupation: Architect, politician

Samuel Purdy (1819 – February 17, 1882) was an American politician. As a Democrat, he served as the third lieutenant governor of California from 1852 to 1856. He also was the first mayor of Stockton, California, where he was in office from 1850 to 1851.

== Early life ==
Purdy was born in New York City in 1819, and was Purdy educated to be an architect.

== Career ==
In October 1850, Purdy was elected as the first mayor of Stockton, California. Purdy designed the city seal that was adopted by its city council.

Purdy served as lieutenant governor of California from 1852 until 1856 under Governor John Bigler. Purdy lost his 1855 re-election bid to Robert M. Anderson, who defeated him with 50.9% of the votes.

Purdy went on to hold various state-wide and municipal offices in California, including Inspector of Revenue for the state and Superintendent of Construction in San Francisco.

== Personal life ==
In 1849, Purdy moved to California. Purdy was married and had seven children. In 1881, one of Purdy's sons, General Erastus Sparrow Purdy, predeceased him in Cairo, Egypt. On February 17, 1882, as a widower, Purdy died in San Francisco, California.

Political offices
Preceded by David C. Broderick; Acting Lieutenant Governor	Lieutenant Governor of California; 1852–1856	Succeeded by Robert M. Anderson
