= Joseph Walkup =

American politician

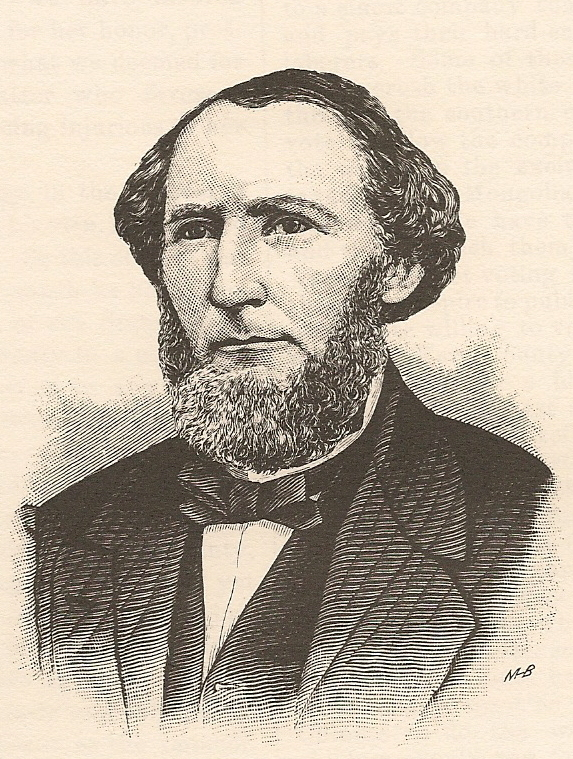

5th Lieutenant Governor of California
- In office January 8, 1858 – January 9, 1860
- Governor: John B. Weller
- Preceded by: Robert M. Anderson
- Succeeded by: John G. Downey

Member of the California State Senate
- In office January 1857 – July 27, 1857
- Constituency: 17th district
- In office 1852–1856
- Constituency: 13th district

Personal details
- Born: December 25, 1819 Piqua, Ohio, U.S.
- Died: October 15, 1873 (aged 53) Placer, California, U.S.
- Resting place: Old Auburn Cemetery, Auburn, California, U.S.
- Party: Democratic
- Profession: Politician

Joseph Walkup (December 25, 1819 - October 15, 1873), a member of the Democratic Party, was the fifth lieutenant governor of California from 1858 to 1860.

== Biography ==
Engraving of Walkup published 1858

Walkup was born in Piqua, Ohio on December 25, 1819. He was educated locally, and after he was orphaned at age 17 he began a career as a carpenter. He worked in Ohio, and eventually made his way to New Orleans, which he expanded his trade to include shipbuilding and steamboat construction.

In 1849, Walkup traveled to California as part of the influx caused by the gold rush. Walkup settled in Auburn, California, where he became successful as a partner in a mercantile business. His success enabled him to branch out to other ventures, including ownership or operation of several farms. Walkup was head of the committee that formed and established Placer County.

A Democrat in politics, Walkup represented the 13th and later the 17th districts in the California State Senate from 1852 until resigning in July 1857. In 1857 he was elected lieutenant governor, and he served one term, 1858 to 1860. In 1860 Walkup was an unsuccessful candidate for the Democratic nomination for governor of California. In 1858, while serving as lieutenant governor, Walkup served as the warden of San Quinten State Prison. After leaving office Walkup remained active in politics as a delegate to numerous party conventions, and he became owner and editor of the Placer Herald newspaper.

Walkup died in Placer on October 15, 1873, after suffering a stroke while working in his office at the Herald. He was buried at Old Auburn Cemetery in Auburn.

Political offices
Preceded by Robert M. Anderson	Lieutenant Governor of California; 1858–1860	Succeeded by John G. Downey
