= Robert M. Anderson (politician) =

American politician

4th Lieutenant Governor of California
- In office January 9, 1856 – January 8, 1858
- Governor: J. Neely Johnson
- Preceded by: Samuel Purdy
- Succeeded by: John Walkup

Personal details
- Born: December 10, 1824 Albemarle County, Virginia, U.S.
- Died: September 17, 1878 (age 53) Swan Lake, Arkansas, U.S.
- Political party: Know Nothing
- Spouse: Lucy Wyatt (m. 1849)
- Children: 3

Robert Moon Anderson (December 10, 1824 – September 17, 1878) was the fourth lieutenant governor of California from 1856 to 1858.

== Biography ==
Anderson was born in Albemarle County, Virginia on December 10, 1824, the son of Nathaniel Anderson and Mildred Cobb Moon.

Little is known of his life, but it appears that he was raised in Memphis, Tennessee, and served in the Mexican–American War before settling in El Dorado, California. He joined the short-lived Know Nothing Party (also called the Native American Party and American Party). He was the party's successful nominee for lieutenant governor in 1856 and served one term, 1856 to 1858. Anderson died in Swan Lake, Arkansas in 1878.

== Family ==
In 1849, he married Lucy Wyatt in Tennessee, and they were the parents of three children.

Political offices
Preceded by Samuel Purdy	Lieutenant Governor of California; 1856–1858	Succeeded by John Walkup
