= John F. Chellis =

American politician (1792–1883)

9th Lieutenant Governor of California
- In office 1862–1863
- Preceded by: Pablo de la Guerra
- Succeeded by: Tim N. Machin

County Treasurer of Trinity County, California
- In office 1853–1854

Personal details
- Born: 1792
- Died: September 17, 1883 (aged 90–91) Myrtle Creek, Oregon, U.S.
- Resting place: Myrtle Creek Odd Fellows Cemetery, Myrtle Creek, Oregon
- Party: Republican
- Occupation: Businessman, Politician
- Known for: Lieutenant Governor of California; warden of San Quentin State Prison

John F. Chellis (1792 – September 17, 1883) was a Republican who became the ninth lieutenant governor of California from 1862 to 1863.

Chellis was a businessman, and owned several ventures in northern California, including a water-powered gristmill in Sebastopol, California. In 1852 and 1853, Chellis was the primary contractor responsible for constructing the Trinity County. From 1853 to 1854, he served as County Treasurer.

Because the state had recently taken control of the prison system, his position as lieutenant governor carried a dual role placing him as warden of San Quentin State Prison. On the evening of July 23, 1862, there was a prison breakout by up to 300 inmates, later regarded as one of the biggest and bloodiest in American history, with Chellis being taken hostage. The previous few years had seen an increasing number of prison escapes with the resulting manhunts ending in violence. This escape was no exception and a large posse tracked down the escapees; Chellis was released relatively unharmed in the process.

Chellis died September 17, 1883, in Myrtle Creek, Oregon. According to a letter to the California Secretary of State from a resident of Myrtle Creek, Chellis, who was unknown to him, had appeared at his house on September 9. Chellis was suffering from a urinary stricture and other health problems, which made him nearly unaware of his surroundings and unable to care for himself. The letter writer, David Scott Kinnear Buick, further indicated that he had procured a nurse and volunteers to care for Chellis, but Chellis did not recover and died eight days later. He was buried in the Myrtle Creek Odd Fellows Cemetery on September 18. In his letter, which was published in several California newspapers, Buick indicated that Chellis had about $12 in cash with him when he died, but no other property. He had no information with him indicating whether he had any relatives, and if so where, so Buick asked for the Secretary of State's assistance in attempting to notify Chellis's family.

Political offices
| Preceded by Pablo de la Guerra; Acting Lieutenant Governor | Lieutenant Governors of California; 1862–1863 | Succeeded by Tim N. Machin |
