= List of jazz trumpeters =

The following is an alphabetical list of jazz trumpeters:

== A ==
- Al Aarons
- Ahmed Abdullah
- Greg Adams
- Nat Adderley
- Sylvester Ahola
- Gus Aiken
- Ambrose Akinmusire
- Ken Albers
- Alvin Alcorn
- Ralph Alessi
- Ed Allen
- Eddie Allen
- Red Allen
- Herb Alpert
- Ovie Alston
- Alfred "Chico" Alvarez
- Franco Ambrosetti
- Cat Anderson
- John Anderson
- Ray Anderson
- Ray Anthony
- Louis Armstrong
- Mark Armstrong
- Herman Autrey
- Donald Ayler

== B ==
- Benny Bailey
- Guy Barker
- Chet Baker
- Harold Shorty Baker
- Kenny Baker
- Kenny Ball
- Chris Barber
- Scotty Barnhart
- Gary Barone
- Mario Bauza
- Uli Beckerhoff
- Bix Beiderbecke
- Marcus Belgrave
- Gustavo Bergalli
- Anders Bergcrantz
- Wayne Bergeron
- Bunny Berigan
- Sonny Berman
- Steven Bernstein
- Bill Berry
- Emmett Berry
- Terence Blanchard
- Buddy Bolden
- Dupree Bolton
- Flavio Boltro
- Sharkey Bonano
- Sterling Bose
- Chris Botti
- Lester Bowie
- Bobby Bradford
- Cindy Bradley
- Ruby Braff
- Rick Braun
- Randy Brecker
- Arthur Briggs
- Bud Brisbois
- Till Brönner
- Clifford Brown
- Maurice "Mobetta" Brown
- Ray Brown
- Tom Browne
- Clora Bryant
- Teddy Buckner
- Miroslav Bukovsky
- Henry Busse
- Billy Butterfield
- Donald Byrd

== C ==
- Juultje Cambré
- Conte Candoli
- Pete Candoli
- Andre Canniere
- Mutt Carey
- Johnny Carisi
- Ian Carr
- Baikida Carroll
- Ernie Carson
- Benny Carter
- Dick Cary
- Lee Castle
- Bill Catalano
- Dick Cathcart
- Papa Celestin
- Bill Chase
- Doc Cheatham
- Don Cherry
- Buddy Childers
- John Chilton
- Johnny Claes
- Buck Clayton
- Avishai Cohen
- George "Kid Sheik" Cola
- Gracie Cole
- Bill Coleman
- Johnny Coles
- Lee Collins
- Ken Colyer
- Corky Cornelius
- Mike Cotton
- Raymond Court
- Theo Croker
- Wendell Culley
- Ted Curson
- Michael K. Clifford

== D ==
- Mike Daniels
- Olu Dara
- Jeremy Davenport
- Wallace Davenport
- John R. T. Davies
- Miles Davis
- Bill Davison
- Demas Dean
- John D'earth
- Sidney De Paris
- Laco Déczi
- Rusty Dedrick
- David Defries
- Claude Deppa
- Jimmy Deuchar
- Josh Deutsch
- Bill Dillard
- Bill Dixon
- Natty Dominique
- Sam Donahue
- Kenny Dorham
- Dave Douglas
- Louis Dowdeswell
- Johnny Dunn
- Jim Dvorak

== E ==
- Jon Eardley
- Ditlef Eckhoff
- Billy Eckstine
- Harry "Sweets" Edison
- Mathias Eick
- Roy Eldridge
- Don Ellis
- Ziggy Elman
- Peter Evans

== F ==
- Jon Faddis
- Don Fagerquist
- Art Farmer
- Dominick Farinacci
- Maynard Ferguson
- Mongezi Feza
- Chuck Findley
- Paolo Fresu
- Tony Fruscella
- Horst Fischer

== G ==
- Thomas Gansch
- Derrick Gardner
- Fred Gerard
- Dizzy Gillespie
- George Girard
- Greg Gisbert
- Volker Goetze
- Duško Gojković
- Dennis González
- Jerry Gonzalez
- Anthony Gorruso
- Conrad Gozzo
- Rowland Greenberg
- Lionel Grigson
- Russell Gunn
- Dave Guy

== H ==
- Bobby Hackett
- Tim Hagans
- Matthew Halsall
- Stu Hamer
- Atle Hammer
- Bill Hardman
- Roy Hargrove
- Tom Harrell
- Michael Harris
- Jon Hassell
- Thomas Heberer
- Eddie Henderson
- Arve Henriksen
- Al Hirt
- Arnett Howard
- Freddie Hubbard
- Jeff Hughes
- Percy Humphrey

== I–J ==
- Roger Ingram
- Mark Isham
- Dan Jacobs
- Don Jacoby
- Russell Jacquet
- Harry James
- Nils Janson
- Ingrid Jensen
- Tore Jensen
- Tore Johansen
- Bunk Johnson
- Connie Jones
- Jonah Jones
- Sean Jones
- Thad Jones
- Bert Joris
- Per Jørgensen

== K ==
- Freddie Keppard
- Ryan Kisor
- Mannie Klein
- Toshinori Kondo
- Philip Kruse

== L ==
- Tommy Ladnier
- Yank Lawson
- Éric Le Lann
- Booker Little
- David Longoria
- Eivind Lønning
- Lee Loughnane
- Henry Lowther
- Brian Lynch
- Humphrey Lyttelton

== M ==
- Ibrahim Maalouf
- Chuck Mangione
- Wingy Manone
- Michael Mantler
- Marky Markowitz
- Wynton Marsalis
- Hugh Masekela
- Irvin Mayfield
- Paul Mazzio
- Howard McGhee
- Mickey McMahan
- John McNeil
- Mike Metheny
- Ron Miles
- Bubber Miley
- Sjur Miljeteig
- Punch Miller
- Pete Minger
- Blue Mitchell
- Nils Petter Molvær
- Howard Moon
- Lee Morgan
- Sam Morgan
- James Morrison
- Mike Mosiello
- Michael Philip Mossman
- Andrea Motis
- Lou Mucci
- Ole Jørn Myklebust

== N–O ==
- Fats Navarro
- Brian Newman
- Joe Newman
- Farnell Newton
- Frank Newton
- Red Nichols
- Teus Nobel
- Jimmy Nottingham
- Kåre Nymark
- Hildegunn Øiseth
- King Oliver
- Sy Oliver
- Stian Omenås
- Jeff Oster
- Ephraim Owens
- Jimmy Owens

== P ==
- Kye Palmer
- Nicholas Payton
- Jeremy Pelt
- Marvin Peterson
- Herb Phillips
- Ward Pinkett
- Verneri Pohjola
- Herb Pomeroy
- Valery Ponomarev
- Hayden Powell
- Louis Prima
- Marcus Printup
- Jack Purvis

== R ==
- Enrico Rava
- Dizzy Reece
- Alexandra Ridout
- Herb Robertson
- Claudio Roditi
- Red Rodney
- Pete Rodriguez
- Shorty Rogers
- Wallace Roney
- Gabriel Rosati
- Jim Rotondi
- Ernie Royal
- Alan Rubin
- Kermit Ruffins

== S ==
- Chase Sanborn
- Arturo Sandoval
- Eddie Santos (trumpet 1921—1950) (member, Raymond C. Fagan Orchestra)
- Carl Saunders
- Vertna Saunders
- Eddie Sauter
- Manfred Schoof
- Matthias Schriefl
- Bob Scobey
- Christian Scott
- Gunhild Seim
- Doc Severinsen
- Charlie Shavers
- Woody Shaw
- Jack Sheldon
- Bobby Shew
- Susana Santos Silva
- Alex Sipiagin
- Bria Skonberg
- Jabbo Smith
- June Smith
- Wadada Leo Smith
- Paul Smoker
- Valaida Snow
- Eivind Solberg
- Torgrim Sollid
- Lew Soloff
- Muggsy Spanier
- Terell Stafford
- Marvin Stamm
- Tomasz Stanko
- Steamboat Willie
- Colin Steele
- Rex Stewart
- Tommy Stewart
- Markus Stockhausen
- Byron Stripling
- Karl Strømme
- Idrees Sulieman
- Ira Sullivan
- Norbert Susemihl
- John Swana

== T–Z ==
- Tony Terran
- Clark Terry
- Tom Albert
- Rachel Therrien
- Charles Tolliver
- Cy Touff
- George Treadwell
- Erik Truffaz
- Kevin Turcotte
- Warren Vache
- Kid Thomas Valentine
- Ack van Rooyen
- Jerry van Rooyen
- Jonas Kilmork Vemøy
- Allen Vizzutti
- Clara de Vries
- Cuong Vu
- Byron Wallen
- Bengt-Arne Wallin
- Jack Walrath
- Ohyama "B.M.W" Wataru
- Lu Watters
- Freddie Webster
- Kenny Wheeler
- Pharez Whitted
- Cootie Williams
- Mike Williams
- Steamboat Willie
- Snooky Young
- Webster Young
- Johnny Zell
- Ed Zandy
