= 1910 California lieutenant gubernatorial election =

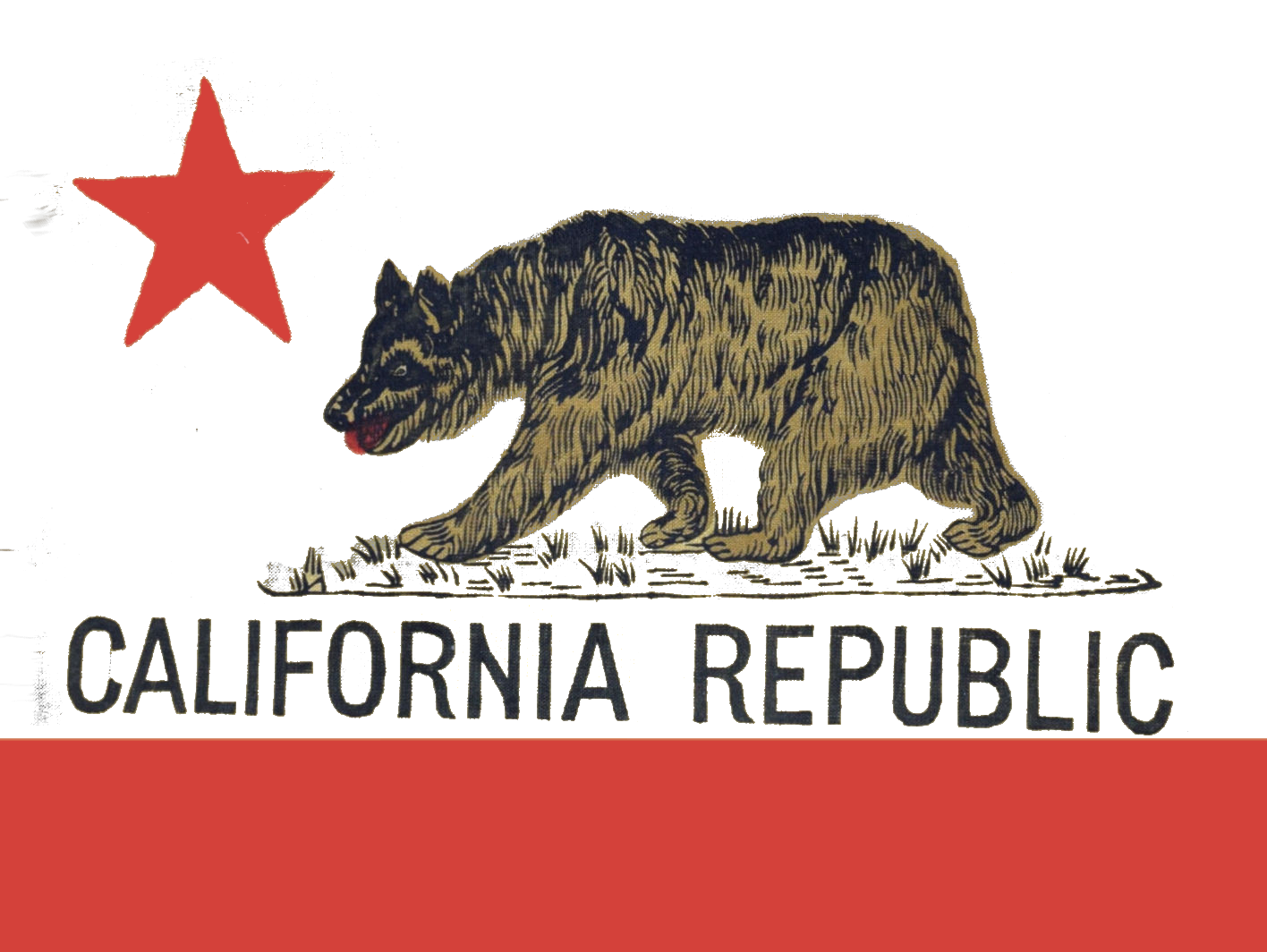
- November 8, 1910
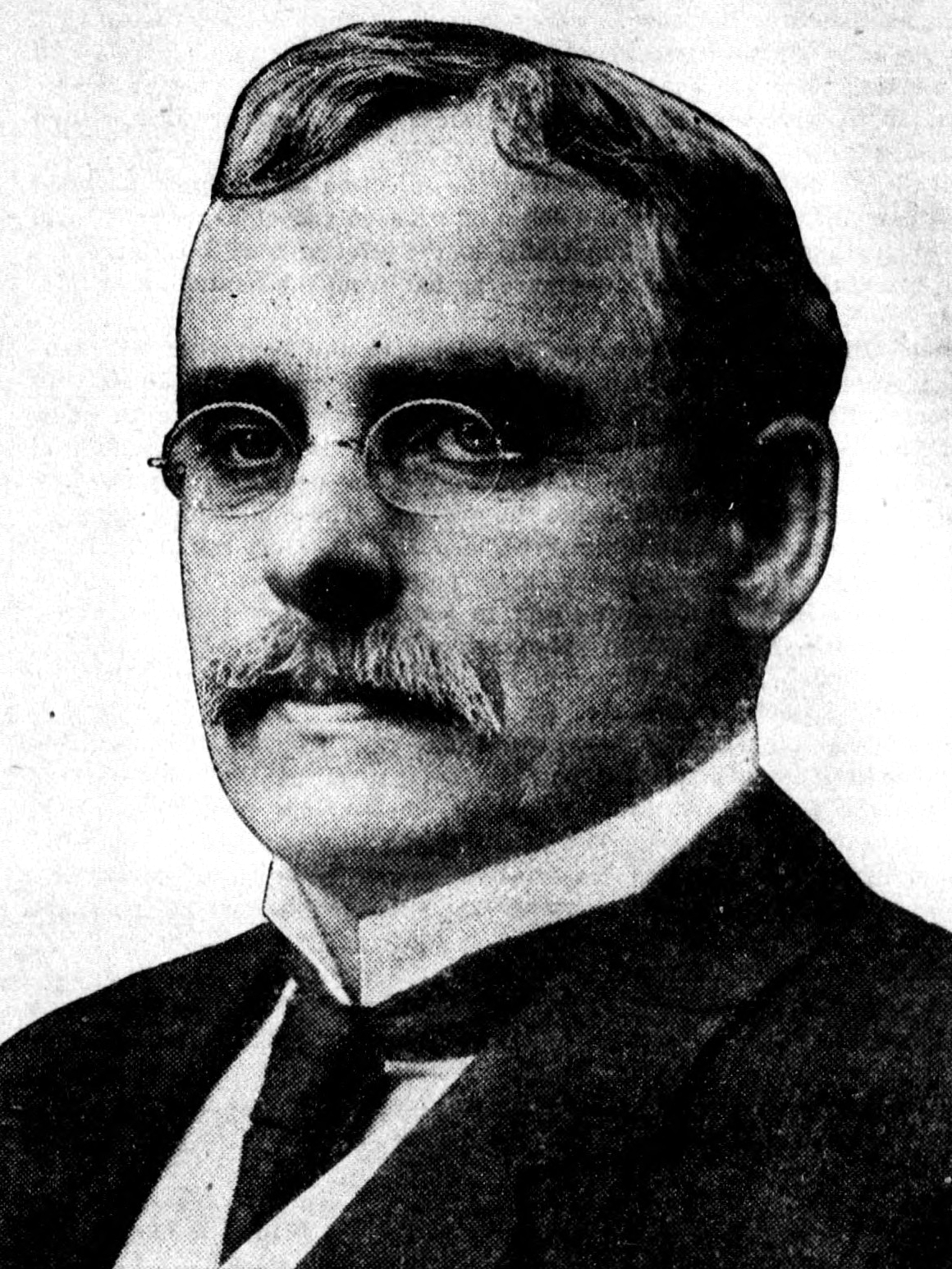

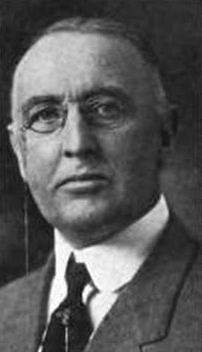

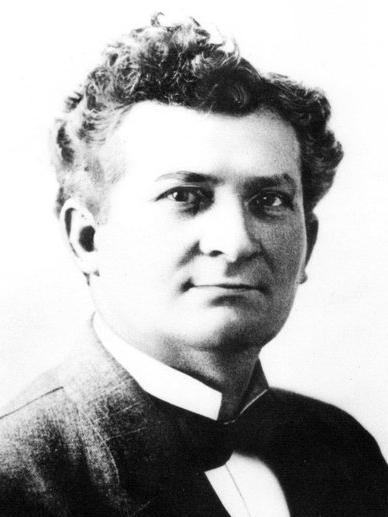
Nominee	Albert Joseph Wallace	Timothy Spellacy	Fred C. Wheeler
Party	Republican	Democratic	Socialist
Popular vote	168,145	153,364	45,830
Percentage	45.09%	41.12%	12.29%
- County results Wallace: 40–50% 50–60% 60–70% 80–90% Spellacy: 40–50% 50–60% 60–70%
Lieutenant Governor before election
Warren R. Porter
Republican
Elected Lieutenant Governor
Albert Joseph Wallace
Republican

The 1910 California lieutenant gubernatorial election was held on November 8, 1910. Republican Los Angeles City Councilman Albert Joseph Wallace defeated Democratic Los Angeles County Civil Service Commissioner Timothy Spellacy with 45.09% of the vote.

== General election ==
=== Candidates ===
- Albert Joseph Wallace, Republican
- Timothy Spellacy, Democratic
- Fred C. Wheeler, Socialist
- Marshall W. Atwood, Prohibition

=== Results ===
1910 California lieutenant gubernatorial election
Party	Candidate	Votes	%	±%
Republican	Albert Joseph Wallace	168,145	45.09%	
Democratic	Timothy Spellacy	153,364	41.12%	
Socialist	Fred C. Wheeler	45,830	12.29%	
Prohibition	Marshall W. Atwood	5,592	1.50%	
Majority		372,931		
Turnout				
Republican hold		Swing		
