= 1914 California lieutenant gubernatorial election =

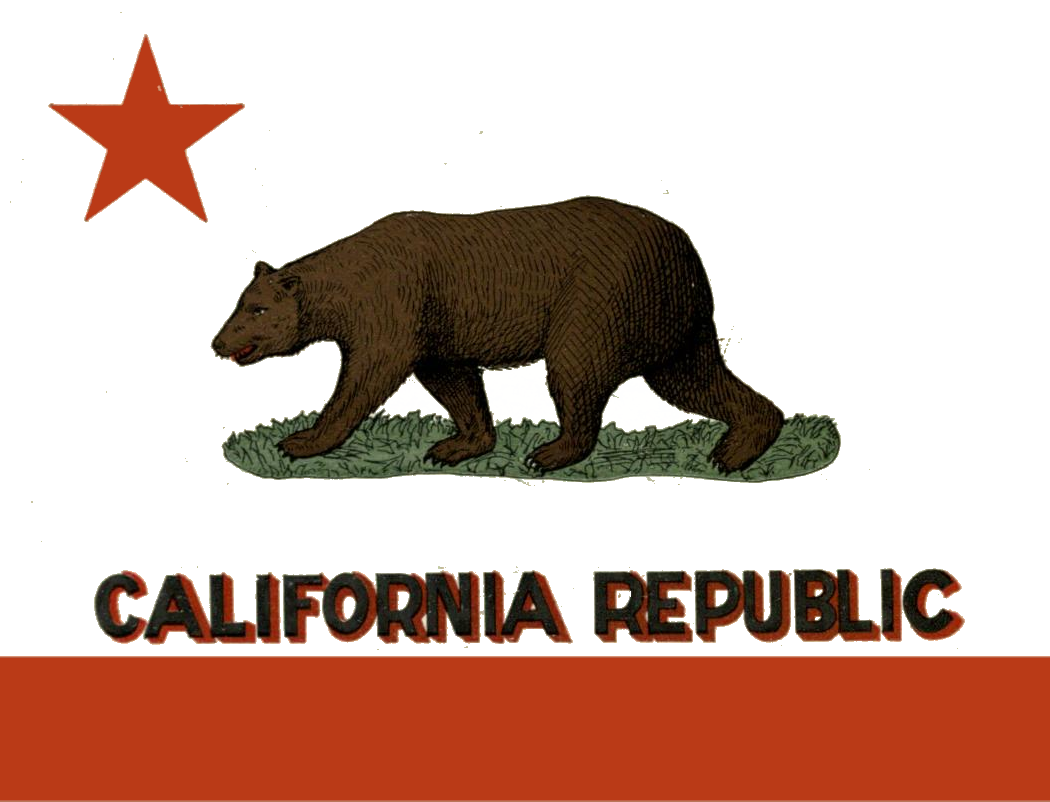
- November 3, 1914
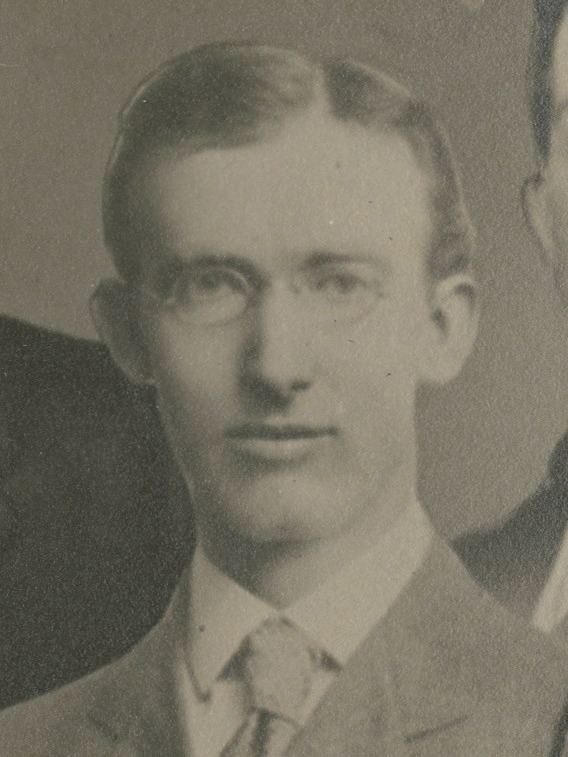

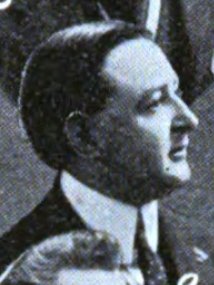

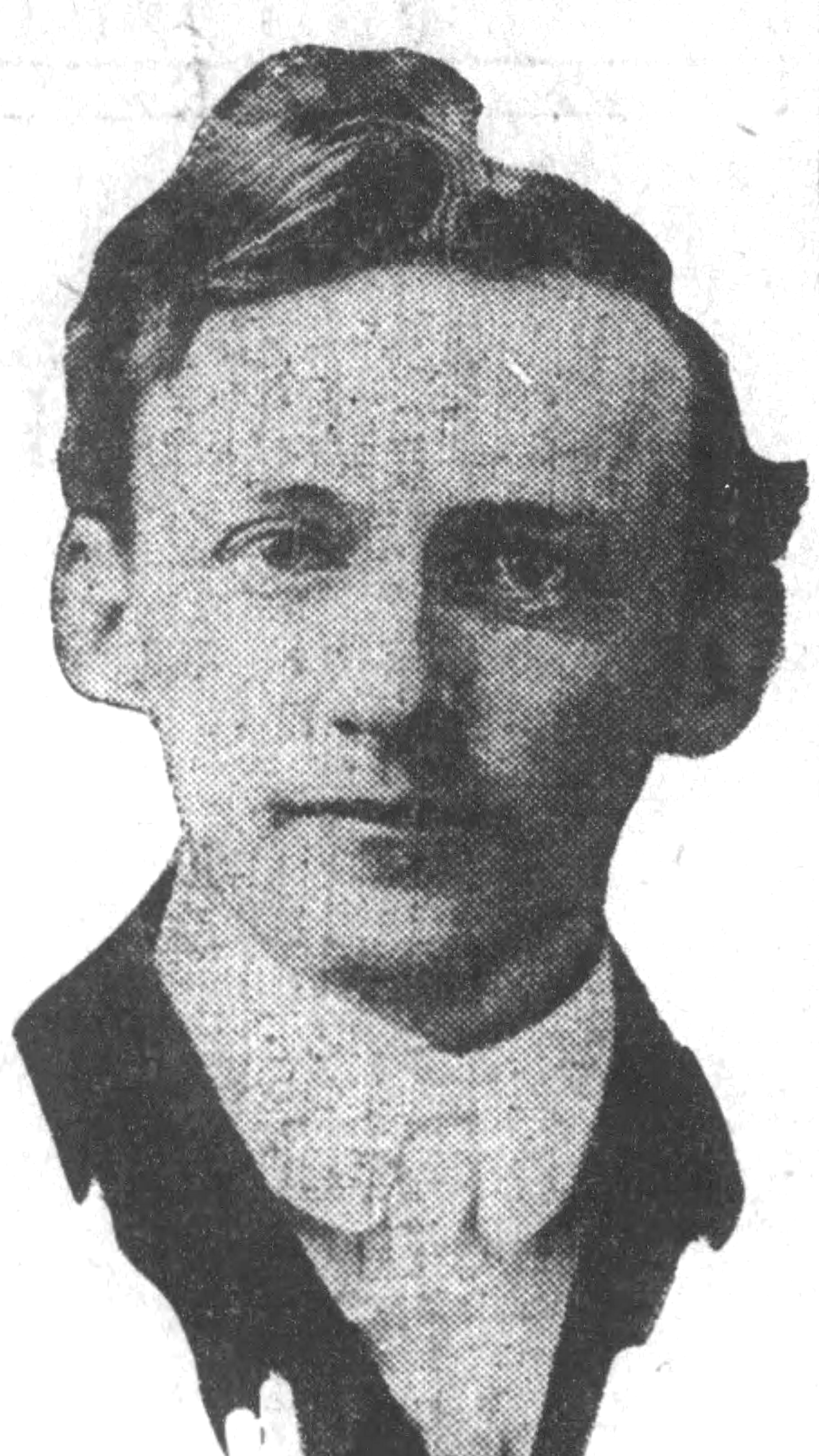

Nominee	John Morton Eshleman	Jo V. Snyder
Party	Progressive	Democratic
Popular vote	533,255	223,011
Percentage	62.31%	26.06%
Nominee	Norman W. Pendleton	Wallace M. Pence
Party	Socialist	Prohibition
Popular vote	50,716	48,783
Percentage	5.93%	5.70%
- County results Eshleman: 30–40% 40–50% 50–60% 60–70% 70–80% Snyder: 40–50% 50–60%
Lieutenant Governor before election
Albert Joseph Wallace
Republican
Elected Lieutenant Governor
John Morton Eshleman
Progressive

The 1914 California lieutenant gubernatorial election was held on November 3, 1914. Progressive State Assemblyman John Morton Eshleman defeated Democratic State Assemblyman Jo V. Snyder with 62.31% of the vote.

== General election ==
=== Candidates ===
- John Morton Eshleman, Progressive
- Jo V. Snyder, Democratic
- Norman W. Pendleton, Socialist
- Wallace M. Pence, Prohibition

=== Results ===
1914 California lieutenant gubernatorial election
Party	Candidate	Votes	%	±%
Progressive	John Morton Eshleman	533,255	62.31%	
Democratic	Jo V. Snyder	223,011	26.06%	
Socialist	Norman W. Pendleton	50,716	5.93%	
Prohibition	Wallace M. Pence	48,783	5.70%	
Majority		855,765		
Turnout				
Progressive gain from Republican		Swing		
