= Three X Sisters =

American all-girl harmony singing trio

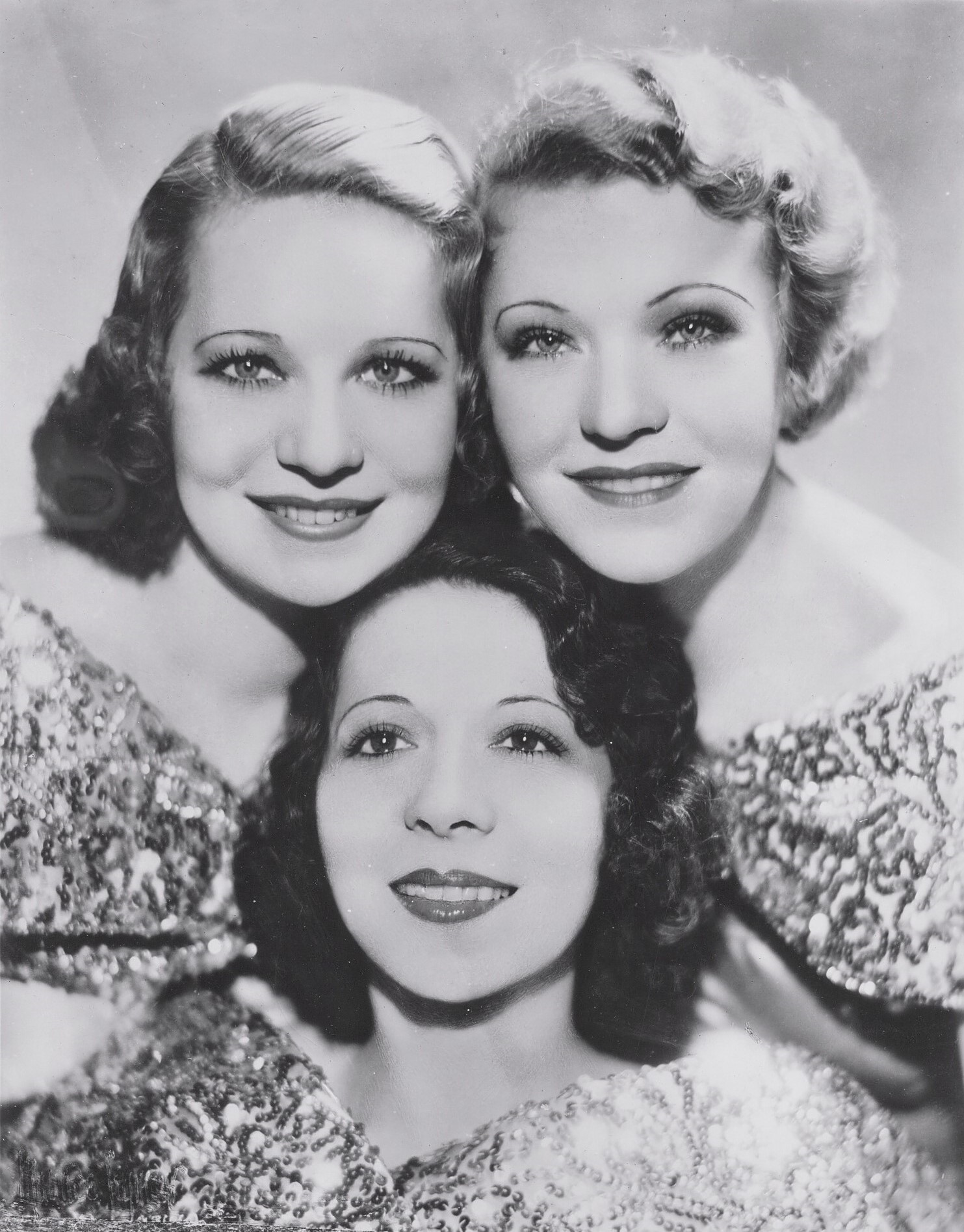
- Three X Sisters, circa 1935

Background information
- Also known as: "The Hamilton Sisters and Fordyce"
- Origin: Cumberland, Maryland, and Brooklyn, New York
- Genres: Vaudeville variety entertainers and singers 1919–1941, All Jazz Revue (1919–1921), popular music, "rhythm and blues", Fleischer Studios
- Years active: 1919–1946
- Labels: RCA Victor, His Master's Voice, Brunswick, Columbia
- Past members: Pearl Santos (née Hamilton) (1900–1978); Violet Hamilton (1906–1983); Jessie Fordyce (1905–2003)
- Website: threexsistersharmony.angelfire.com

The Three X Sisters were an American all-girl harmony singing trio initially known as The Hamilton Sisters and Fordyce. They were on stage singing together in New York City, on Broadway, as early as 1922 and formed their trio in 1924, which was composed of Pearl Santos (née Hamilton) and Violet Hamilton from Cumberland, Maryland, and Jessie Fordyce from Brooklyn, New York. They were known on NBC radio as "radio's foremost harmony trio".

== History and career ==
The Hamilton family had been in Cumberland for nearly a century by the early 1910s, with their European heritage coming from Pennsylvania, Ohio, and New York. They also descended from the Native American population who lived in the Allegheny Mountains. The Hamilton sisters sang individually in Cumberland theaters, winning prizes for their music. Pearl's early sheet music was inspired by Frédéric Chopin and Stephen Foster. The sisters began singing harmony during their careers in Cumberland.

Jessie's family, the Yules, immigrated from Scotland. She grew up in Brooklyn, New York, and performed alongside her father, Arthur Yule. She was in the Brooklyn vaudeville circuit with the stage name "Baby Helen" when she was a child. By 1914, both the Hamiltons and Jessie were fairly well known in their respective industries.

Pearl Hamilton began her career on Broadway as early as 1917. Her roommate during this era was Joan Page, another 'Stars of the Future' entertainer/singer. The average salary in 1919 was $22.00 per week for the All Jazz Revue "chorus girls." Pearl started out as a soft shoe (ballet style) and high-kick dancer, and received positive dance reviews. The Hamiltons began their professional singing careers in harmony at the Haymarket Theatre in Chicago, Illinois. Pearl watched a live performance of the Original Dixieland Jass Band in Coney Island, New York after her arrival to Broadway stages, which also served as an early music inspiration. Some walk-on or cameo parts in silent films with Paramount Pictures showed their dancing talents. Pearl's earliest known paired ragtime and jazz piano took place on August 17, 1919 with the 'Jazz Quartet with the Morette Sisters' at the Fremont Opera House in Fremont, Ohio. December 30, 1920 paired broadway Pearl's musicianship and jazz piano. Since 1907, the Morette Sisters were highly acclaimed instrumentalists of violin, alto viola, coronet, and trombone. The Morette Sisters also utilized duet singing along with the terpesciorian dance themes. They had a fluent knowledge of classical and dance music, as well as the popular Ragtime music of the early 1900s. Songs the Morettes introduced to the new troupe included "Danse d'eve," "Artist's Model," "The Entertainer," and "Ragtime Cowboy." In 1920, Pearl and Violet Hamilton had been part of the vocal chorus. A later addition was friend Jessie (Yule) Fordyce with the 'All Jazz Revue', the Swear Club (a women's club) was reviewed by The Billboard on January 10, 1920. Pearl, "a tall, willowy girl, Is a dancing wonder" as her artistry in dance had become well known. The Morettes had been part of "Oh Baby!", a burlesque theatre circuit act during the 1919-20 season had sold out performance engagements. Somewhere between a "one liner", as Pearl noted, harmony influence with the Morettes, and a viewed performance by the Ford, and Brox Sisters, then Pearl had decided to try trio harmonies for her dream trio. The Hamilton Sisters and Fordyce later carried the "Oh Baby!" theme to the 1928 original broadway show "Rain or Shine".

The trio started out on Broadway and in vaudeville, with Helen Kane Schroeder, the original Boop-boop-a-Doop Girl. Broadway singing styles, and Irving Berlin music had inspired this group. The trio performed various song and dance acts, eventually settling for close harmony, which was associated with three-part harmony singing. The Hamilton Sisters and Fordyce earliest known performance together (as a trio team) was at B.F. Keiths Theater in Syracuse, New York, on May 13, 1923. In 1924, they also toured in vaudeville, with Helen Kane and Anna Mae Wong. Pearl's harmony trio had the musicianship of the Raymond Fagan Orchestra (a band with no known recordings); a band compared to Paul Whiteman or the Vincent Lopez Orchestras. Pearl Hamilton met Ed Santos (a Music Union member), who also had a lengthy stay with early 1930s Red Nichols; according to Patty Andrews, "He [Ed] played with Tony Pastor". Ed played trumpet with Fagan's band, and a year later, Pearl and Ed married in Rochester, New York. During early July 1925, the Hamilton Sisters and Jessie Fordyce were singing at the Eighty-First Street Theatre. In 1926, the trio toured with another popular all-girl act, Jerry and her Baby Grands, appearing together at the Palace Theater in New York. They also toured together in Canada.

== 1927 ==
The Hamilton Sisters and Fordyce gained enough success to tour abroad. After they departed from the "Stars of the Future" entertainment showcase in the spring of 1927, their management, fronted by Ed Wolfe, had them tour Europe. They departed by airplane at a Long Island airport with the American portion of New York's Savoy Orpheans musical unit during the week of May 23, 1927.

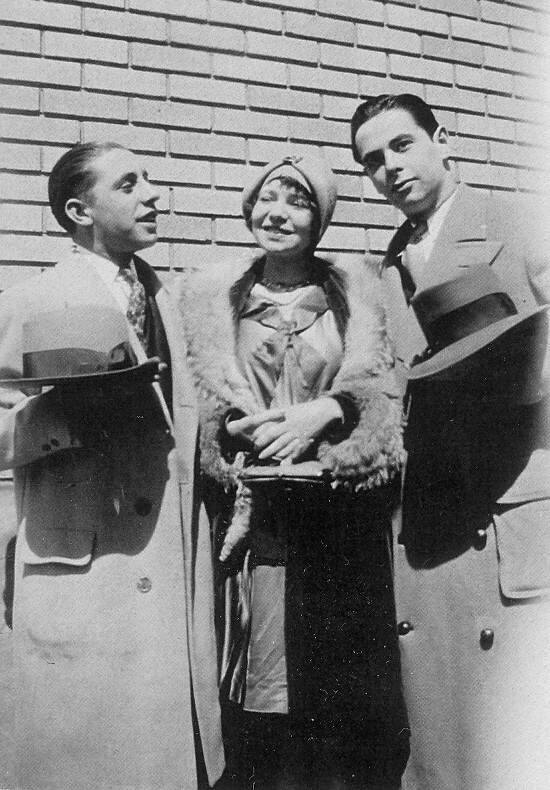
Songwriters Richard Rodgers and Lorenz Hart with Violet W. Hamilton in England, 1927

In the UK, they met up with American songwriters Richard Rodgers and Lorenz Hart. They also spent time in the recording studio with Bert Ambrose, a British bandleader, musical director Caroll Gibbons, and violinist/director Reg Batton. They toured with the New York engagement and appeared on London and Manchester stages. Played the London Palladium, Alhambra Theatre of Variety, and Plaza. Made a big splash in the theater production Blue Skies.

On October 27, 1927, Harry Plunket Greene, Irish baritone tenor, wrote of the trio after an England performance: "The Hamilton Sisters & Fordyce are just A1 as they are. I wouldn't interfere with them for anything. It's just perfect in its way. I do trust they leave things alone, not try to change."

That November, the trio teamed up with Billy Mayerl, pianist, to do close harmonizing on "Who You, That's Who?", and "Zulu Wail". Their first on-air radio broadcasts were in England on the BBC. The trios' first return to America; departed England on December 10 for Paris. They sailed from Cherbourg, France (New York, Passenger Lists) on the U.S.S. Leviathan on Dec. 15, 1927 for New York City. Reports also show a two-year radio contract signed with the BBC, tours with the Savoy Havana Band to European clubs in Paris, Vienna, Berlin, Monte Carlo, and at the 'Kit Kat Club' in 1928.

== Broadway to American radio ==
When the popularity of the vaudeville on stage showcase Playtime had become a real success, it attracted the attention of Broadway play Rain or Shine in early 1928. Jessie had the idea for Playtime. Tom Howard was the writer. The routine they did placed their on-stage performance alongside Joe Cook, comedian. The Hamiltons and Fordyce were so well received that the Playtime showcase was recommended to run on its own merit.

The group's radio success started when the trio appeared in publicity photographs wearing eye masks and capitalized on the new popularity of radio. Pearl needed to make a choice between investing in records or concentrating on radio work. She chose to tour the US extensively and sign with such sponsors as Ford, Chase and Sanborn, Best Foods, Tydol, Babbo, and others to pursue the radio career for her trio. A CBS Radio sponsor hired them, and they took a new stage name, "The Three X Sisters". In 1932, they were featured alongside other harmony trios in the November issue of Radio Digest Magazine. From October to December on the WABC-CBS radio program, you'd find this scenario, with the Three X Sisters at the 7:30 p.m. time, followed by Connie Boswell at 7:45 p.m. They were also with ABC radio doing some cartoon scenario songs, appeared on the Eddie Cantor Show, and harmonized the song "Those Eddie Cantor Eyes". Some radio transcribed tunes which they sang to identify the 1930s era in rhythm and blues are "Old Clothes", "Good Times Coming", and "Still No Luck With You" (with Pearl's piano, and Steve Brown (bass player)). Pearl's piano style was crafted exclusively on their Musical Grocery Store radio tenure, alongside the Harry Salter Orchestra. By 1934 they were guests on The Nick Kenny Radio Hour and were performers/singers in part of the Nick Kenny (poet) scripted "Radio Scandals". They also introduced animation soundtrack songs over on-air radio broadcasts. They attributed voice-work for the popular Max Fleischer Cartoons synched with their early radio-work, and by 1933 they had a regular time-slot with NBC Radio. They continued on the airwaves until 1938 and were still popular at the Chicago Theater in Illinois, Palace Theater in NYC, and the Stanley Theater (now Benedum Center) in Pennsylvania on the same playbill as the Three Stooges. Entertainment news columnists found amusement in the name recognition.

== Recordings and movie shorts in the 1930s ==
When a combined recording count is made, from 1927 to 1933 this trio had made 15 known professional song recordings (if song medleys are added then it's closer to 20). Most of those have been on records. This does not account for the Fleischer cartoon soundtracks. Additionally, their best known filmed song routine was completed with Paramount Pictures in 1935 with "Rex and His Soundeffects." Numerous transcribed recordings had been made on commercial 16 inch disks, or for hire by Tin Pan Alley recording studios onto 10" disks, years 1933–38; between 100 and 200, 3 song sets or medley's were transcribed, although, results of low cost recorded efforts which have damaged, deteriorated, and effected the recordings by age and time. Additional recordings in 1937, and 1940-42 exist on the NBC "Behind the Mike" program, Fleischer Studio soundtracks, and demo recordings. Modern day UK-based harmony trio, The Haywood Sisters, have recorded and perform "Rex and His Sound Effects" and are working on recording more of the Three X Sisters' music for modern audiences.

In 1932, the Three X Sisters were part of the CBS Tydol Jubilee Show and toured for a while with one of the hottest dance bands in the country, Paul Specht and His Orchestra, which was also popular with the college audience. In July they teamed up with Eddy Duchin and released at least one tune, "The Clouds Will Soon Roll By", as the Hamilton Sisters. In October of the same year, the sisters recorded several songs with the band of Isham Jones – another popular CBS artist – and two songs were recorded for RCA Victor. Jones experimented with arrangements that had an early Swing era bounce. The 1932 Victor- Isham Jones band segments were filmed in its unique character. Pearl, Vi, and Jessie decided to give up their weekends to do movie shorts. The Audition, 1932, featured a few acts, including the trio backed by the jazz guitarist Eddie Lang (heard but not seen in film). This is the same time frame that Annette Hanshaw had teamed with the jazz guitarist too. Lang guitar plucked his way along to "Here Comes The Showboat", as the trio sang, and it remained a popular short into 1933. Later in 1933, the trio was at the Coolidge memorial service - Washington Cathedral - "Three X Sisters" were part of the memorial service entertainment. Pearl started to use recording services at this time to preserve some of their radio performances. Teamed up with Mary Small on some of the "Little Miss Babo Surprise Party" in 1934. In 1935 the trio was teamed up with the Paramount Studio Orchestra which included another featured guitarist (with camera close-up's) on the Excuse My Gloves also known as Pardon My Glove movie short - the Three X Sisters sang amazingly to "Rex and His Sound Effects." It was reviewed with Ted Huseing, announcer, as one of the "outstanding" short features during the summer of 1935. The vocals and harmony are wonderful - the music sounds very Sweet and Swing era oriented.

== Harmony trio broadcast over 1930s radio ==
The early 1930s saw the radio departures of the Boswell Sisters, Brox Sisters, and musical leader Jane Pickens with her Pickens Sisters trio. The Three X Sisters remained on American radio airwaves, and were top harmonizers on 1930s radio. They had also become CBS network radio artists, then later signing with NBC radio. During the summer/fall 1932, the " X Sisters" were signed with Tidewater and the Freddie Rich Orchestra for three times a week with CBS, and continued with Paul Specht on other nightly radio programs throughout that year. The trio signed their first "Artist Bureau" radio contract with N.B.C. Monday, February 13, was their first song assignment at 6:30 over the WJZ (AM) network. A Competition was formed between the Three X Sisters and the Do-Re-Mi's, both the tops of their singing game in February 1933. Broadcasting management had the lady harmonists (individually) sing with musical accompaniment perform at different locations, and have it all brought together over a radio broadcast by the station radio swithchboard team. After the trio and Specht departed their Tidewater Oil Show (Tydol), they found a new nich with the Eddie Cantor Show (Chase and Sanborn Show) in 1933, as well as, in May with the Musical Grocery Store Program (Best Foods - sponsor for Hellman's Mayonnaise) were also doing harmonies with Tom Howard, performance with Jeanie Lang (the King of Jazz, 1930) and the Rythmn Boys. They were one of a few guest spot singers on the Lum and Abner show during May-Dec1933. In 1934, they had many guest spot appearances alongside Mary Small on her Little Miss Bab-O Program (Babbitt Company—a detergent soap company). On Sunday April 8, 1934 the trio shared the guest spot on the Bab-O show with Mario Cozzi, a New York baritone opera singer on WEAF. Cozzi recorded for Victor records, and had completed work at the New York Studio no. 2, in late February. Their harmonies continued and by 1935, they renewed their radio contract with NBC for 26 weeks. They were well known at the WJZ and WEAF (WNBC (AM)) microphone.

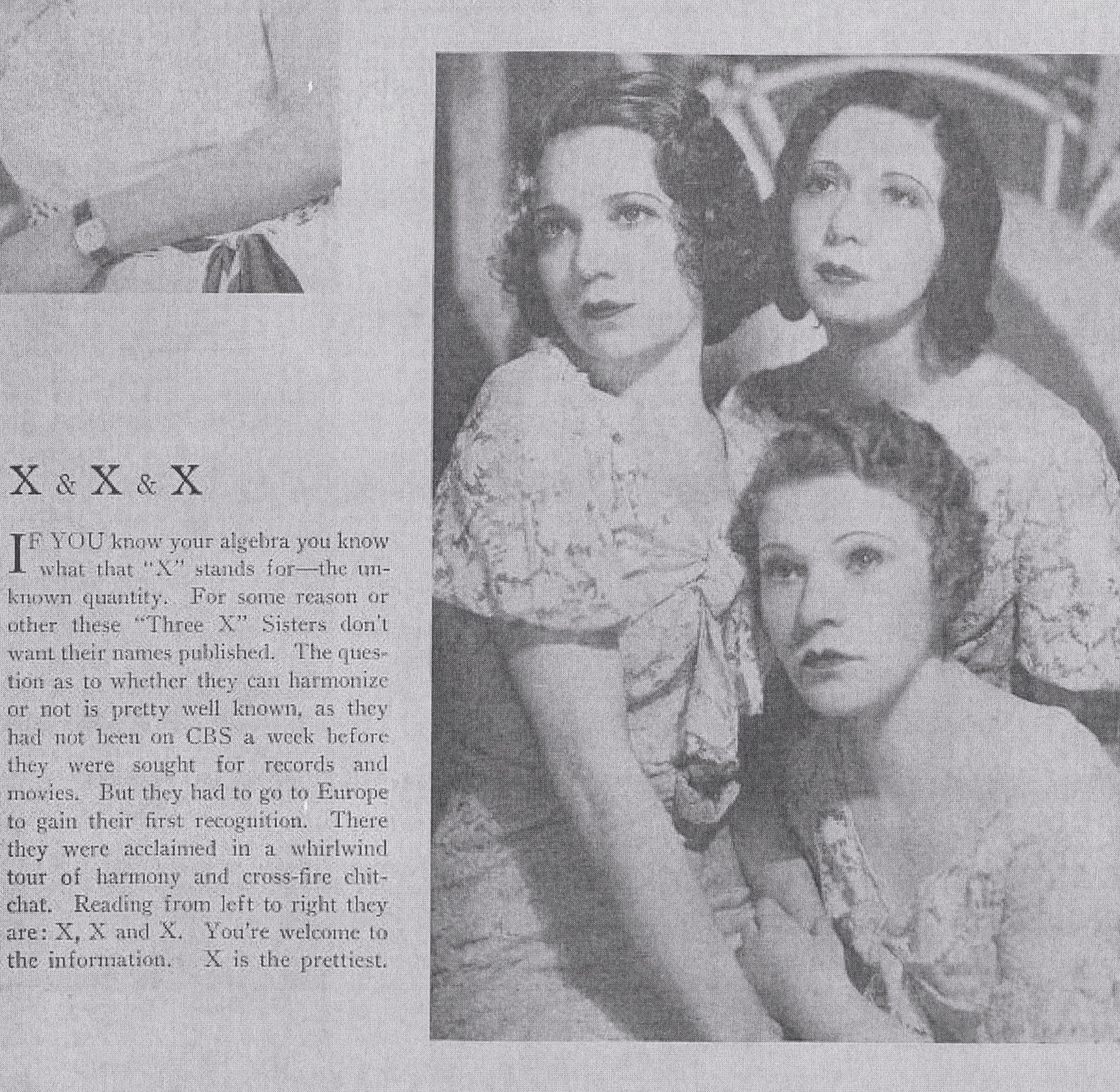
As portrayed in a Radio Digest magazine article, 1932

Radio had the Three X Sisters in a prominent spot as of 1933, and they were at the "Theatre Circuit" microphone at the Waldorf Astoria from 1933 to 1935. Eddie Duchin and Emil Coleman Orchestra's were at most of those events. Many Three X Sisters songs were featured during 1934, as well as in April and July during guest appearances on Little Miss Bab-O's Surprise Party with Mary Small and (William) Bill Wirges and His Orchestra.

In August 1934, the X's (were also Bab-O's guests) - then Mary Small, Jimmy Wallington, and other NBC personalities were performing at the Steel Pier in Atlantic City, NJ. In mid-February 1935, they were touring Chicago and broadcast over WJZ on Monday and Wednesday, until their arrival back in New York after March 2, as 1935 in music also proved to be a popular time for them. Made an appearance on the 'One Night Stand' broadcast on CBS singing a novelty "Three Little Pigs Are Porkchops Now." A big comedy inspired, radio audience appreciation song. Then an octet had been formed for the 'Rythmn Octette' program heard on WEAF-NBC at 7:30pm time slot. It paired the X Sisters, Three Scamps, Morton Gould and Bert Shefster, pianists, for Friday night broadcasts. Early November 1935, the trio headlined a big gala variety stage-show at the Hotel Astor. Despite the forever present 1930s Great Depression the trio got plenty of radio work. After only three weeks on the radio in America they were hired for movie shorts Radio Guide magazine ran a full-page story about Mary Small, radio singer, and Small said about her singing career ... "There are three lovely ladies to whom I owe a great deal. They are Vi and Pearl Hamilton, and Jessie Fordyce, whom you hear on the radio as the Three X Sisters. It was they who heard me in Baltimore when I was eleven years old and really got me started." (October 5, 1935) Mary was a fan of the Three X Sisters before she became a radio singer.

Their radio popularity continued in 1936, while they shared the stage with the New Ziegfeld Follies, Oliver Wakefield, monologist, as the Three X Sisters had also featured an advanced publisher's desk song the "Last Round Up", another of Billy Hill's popular tunes. In 1937, they remained well known in the songwriters' publishing world, especially that of Shapiro, and Bernstein Music Publishers on Broadway with Tin Pan Alley, sheet music from publishers had an appreciation for their NBC microphone. More radio recordings had been made of their song journey, and some with the Harry Smith Recording Studio in New York. Rumors about their radio departure reached the entertainment pages early in the year, however, not before the songbirds put together some of the best blues styled harmonies. They were sought for sheet-music songs but also for advanced song material for soundtracks from Hollywood movies. Some of these radio songs (mechanically transcribed onto 78 rpm recorded discs) were "It Looks Like Rain In Cherry Blossom Lane" and "Would You?" (on air advertisement for the motion picture, San Francisco). "We sell songs on the air...," quoted from Pearl, which affirmed the Three X Sisters radio notoriety.

== Broadway styles changed ==
After their radio success in 1937, the trio started to record demo records with a variety of musicians. Popular as ever in 1938, Pearl B. Santos had assembeled her own All Star Band, and recorded at the Columbia Recording Studio's (the unannounced bankruptcy laden company before company sale). It left the Three X Sisters with no radio or recording contract. Pearl had musical connection's of this era, with some band members of the Dorsey Brothers, Harry Salter, Bill Wirges, and Ernie Watson Orchestra's. After all of that, they left us with one WNEW radio recording of "Why'd You Make Me?" with Pearl at the piano. Pearl's songwriting authorship, and piano melodies (which had been heard on some radio programs for many years) had now peeked to their new medium. The X Sisters had some public appearances with Henry Armetta and the Three Stooges. And continued with Fleisher Paramount Studio performances. In 1939, the Three X Sisters teamed up with such musical act's, in March with Rita Rio in a "new Swing Review", Gerald Griffin with a collaborative song "Jive Rumba", and by the end of the year, again with Mary Small. After 1940, Pearl's band, with Mary Small, the vocalist, read and practiced Pearl's new original song compositions. It truly was a mystery band that Pearl had assembeled. A 1990's interview with Patty, of the newly popular Andrews Sisters, described the "Three X Sisters were Early Jazz," (she mentioned to Pearl's grandson, Glenn Santos). The idea's of the late 1937 Swing Era new recording style's had become a more modern notion for the audience.

On September 29, 1940, over the NBC (Blue Network), Graham McNamee, on Behind the Mike, described to the Radio City Music Hall studio audience how "radio's most popular harmony trio" had discovered the singing talents of Mary Small. Pearl, Vi, and Jessie talk with Graham and Ed Wolf about Mary's wonderful voice. A Three X Sisters reunion took place January 26, 1941 on NBC radio with Graham McNamee on his Behind the Mike program (this can be listened to online), where it reintroduced their harmony singing. The group also introduced on this program an English version of the Latin-style song "Frenesi", conducted by Ernie Watson and his NBC Orchestra, which was their last recorded radio song appearance; they sang there again on January 31. In 1940, Pearl's written composition and Mary's vocals had collaborated on a '78 recorded demo of 'Smile American Smile.' In March 1941, the song was featured on the Morely's "On Page Two" script programs on local Brooklyn, New York WBBC and WEVD stations. Jessie also joined the cast of The 'Oneill's radio show, as Ginger Raymond.

Later, in 1943 or 1944, tweaking her composition, they attended some USO benefit concerts. Their harmony trio did some song jingles for the Carr Buscuit Co. in Pennsylvania. Jessie became Cookie Carr, the character for the jingle; also sang duets (live on stage) with Artie Dunn, of the Three Suns. Individually, the " X Sisters" stepped out and performed solo engagements. Pearl and Mary Small performed at one live event with Pearl's songwriting, piano, and big-band style arrangement, as Mary sang the song "Smile America Smile". Pearl then assembled shows which featured her penned compositions. In 2020, their Centennial Celebration of Songs had been underway, which featured the best of their harmony voices. Also, a re-recording effort of Pearl's original songs written from the late 1930s-early 40s, then demo recordings into the early 1950s. Some of these have been preserved onto modern day 2020's era 33LP song albums.

== Song list ==
- Chimes Of Merry Christmas (Pearl B. Santos and Violet W. Hamilton) 1940 Written by Pearl & Violet while they still performed with Jessie of the Three X Sisters. Pearl had mentioned to her grandson, Glenn, that the trio briefly sang this during the 1940s stage holiday shows. This 78 rpm home recording features Violet on vocals and chimes, Pearl on piano and backup harmony. Matilda Bovey, Pearl and Vi's mom, plays the harp. Online song release date Dec. 20, 2021.
- Modern day tributes. "Rex and His Soundeffects" (aired Sept. 3, 2016, on station WERA 96.7FM at 7:30pm in Arlington, Virginia, along with "Muddy Water", "Indian Rock and Roll", "Fond Recollections of Home", and others).
- The Little Girl With The Big Voice documentary about Mary Small in 2015. The Haywood Sisters in 2013, and the Choo choo Sisters in 2014, tribute songs by the Three X Sisters harmony trio.
- "My Heart Stood Still" (R. Rodgers, L. Hart); June 1927; England.(Brunswick-105) Ambrose & His Mayfair Orch., vocals, Hamilton Sisters and Fordyce.
- "The Birth of the Blues" (DeSylva, Brown, Henderson); June 1927; England. (Brunswick-108) band and vocals - same as above.
- "One Summer Night" (Coslow, Spier); June 1927; England. (Brunswick-107) band and vocals - same as above.
- "Possibly"; June 1927; England. (Brunswick-107) band and vocals - same as above.
- "Someone to Watch Over Me"; (G. Gershwin). 1927; England. Savoy Orpheans. (His Master's Voice-B5322) vocals, Hamilton Sisters and Fordyce.
- "Blue Room" (R. Rodgers, L. Hart); 1927; England. Recorded. Savoy Orpheans. (His Master's Voice-B5322) Vocals: Hamilton Sisters and Fordyce.
- "One Summer Night"; Savoy Orpheans (different version) (His Master's Voice-B5333). Recorded date same as above.
- "The Man I Love"; 1927; England, stage show. Vocals: Hamilton Sisters and Fordyce.
- "Who, You That's Who?" (Yellen-Ager) (Columbia 4698); November 1927; England. Piano: Billy Meryl; vocals: Hamilton Sisters and Fordyce.
- "Zulu Wail" (Skinner-Bibo) (Columbia 4698); November 1927; England; piano, Billy Meryl; vocals, Hamilton Sisters and Fordyce.
- "The Devil Is Afraid Of Music" (W.Robison) from UK Theatrical Production Blue Skies 1927.
- "Here Comes the Showboat" (B. Rose, M. Pinkard); (Vitaphone-Warner Bros.); the Audition 1932; guitarist, Eddie Lang; vocals, Three X Sisters.
- "The Clouds Will Soon Roll By" (Woods, Brown); July 1, 1932; (Columbia 2680-D) Eddie Duchin & His Central Park Casino Orchestra; vocals, Hamilton Sisters.
- "Where, I Wonder, Where?" (Victor 24161)
- "What Would Happen to Me if Something Happened to You?" (Victor 24162) October 13, 1932. New York Studio No.1.(RCA Victor) Isham Jones & His Orch.; vocals, Three X Sisters.
- "Shuffle Off to Buffalo"; June 16, 1933 (scripted lyrics from broadway 42nd Street Musical); Radio Transcript Recording; vocals, Three X Sisters.
- "Everybody Loves My Baby"; Oct. 21, 1932; CBS Radio log.
- "The Night When Love Was Born"; Oct. 21, 1932; CBS Radio log.
- "I Love To Sing At The Opera"; 1933; Radio Transcript Recording; vocals, Three X Sisters.
- "Scat Song"; 1933; Soundtrack 'Sing Sisters Sing' Paramount Pictures cartoon;vocals ".
- "If Mother's Could Live On Forever"; July 20, 1937 (NBC):Radio Transcript Recording (ARS).
- "Marcus Park Your Carcus Somewhere Else" (satirical spinoff of Dr. Marcus Parkus from the Rudy Valley Show): Radio Transcript Recording (ARS);(WEAF) July 20, 1937.
- "Old Clothes"; Radio Transcript Recording (ARS); (WEAF) July 20, 1937
- "Would You?"; 1937; Radio Transcript Recording (NBC); vocals Three X Sisters.
- "Why'd Ya' Make Me"; Aug. 20, 1938 (WNEW).
- "It Looks Like Rain In Cherry Blossom Lane"; July 20, 1937 (NBC); Radio Transcript Recording (ARS).
- "Sing and Be Happy"; Aug. 17, 1937; Radio Transcript Recording.
- "So Many Memories" (R.Rodgers, L.Hart); July 20, 1937; Radio Transcript Recording (included with Yours and Mine).
- "This Is My Last Affair" (H.Johnson); July 20, 1937; Radio Transcript Recording (NBC) (included with "Yours and Mine") vocals, Violet Wanita Hamilton
- "Yours and Mine"; July 20, 1937 (NBC); Radio Transcript Recording (ARS).
- "You Can't Brush Me Off" (Irving Berlin); Recorded demo 1940.vocals, Violet Wanita Hamilton.
- "Tiger Rag"; Radio Transcript Recording.
- Good Times Coming; Radio Transcript Recording.
- "Frenesi" (Alberto Dominguez): (English words by Ray Charles and S.K. Russell) (NBC-Behind the Mike); Jan. 26, 1941; Radio Transcript Recording. vocals, Three X Sisters.
- "Maybe, I Lost Your Love? By Lovin' You So"; 1946 (Shapiro & Bernstein, publishers); Introduced by Russ Morgan and His Orchestra. Recorded demo by the Hamilton Sisters (Pearl and Vi)Dec. 11, 1945.
- "Muddy Water"; Recorded demo 1937. vocals, Violet Wanita Hamilton.

Cartoon songs

- "Barnacle Bill The Sailor"; Three X Sisters with Paul Specht & His Orchestra (WABC); November 18, 1932.
- "Betty Boop" (John Green, Edward Heyman). Famous Music Corporation. (WABC); November 1932.
- "Poor Robinson Caruso"; Harry Smith Recording Service, NYC; (WEAF) April 5, 1937. Musicians, Luz Brothers. vocals, Three X Sisters.
- "Rex and His Soundeffects"; Paramount Pictures 'Excuse My Gloves' (also known as 'Pardon My Glove') 1935;vocals, Three X Sisters.

Notable songs

- "A-Tisket, A-Tasket", "You Too Can Be The Life Of The Party", Alexander's Ragtime Band; performed live at the Hippodrome, Baltimore, Maryland October 30, 1938.
- "Bye, Bye Baby" (R. King); (WEAF) July 20, 1937; Radio Recording Service (ARS).
- "Throwing Stones At The Sun"
- "The Old Spinning Wheel"
- "I'm An Old Cowhand"
- "Colorado Moon"
- "Please, Mr. President" (WEAF);June 16, 1933.
- "Sweet Georgia Brown"
- "Mardi Gras", "Song of the Islands", "Mississippi Mud"; radio performance with Paul Specht & Orchestra, 7:30pm (WABC) November 18, 1932.
- "Who's Afraid of the Big Bad Wolf?" 1934 (Paramount Pictures) sang in conjunction with 'Radio Roundup', part of the movie 'Six Of A Kind'
