= George W. Bristow =

American judge

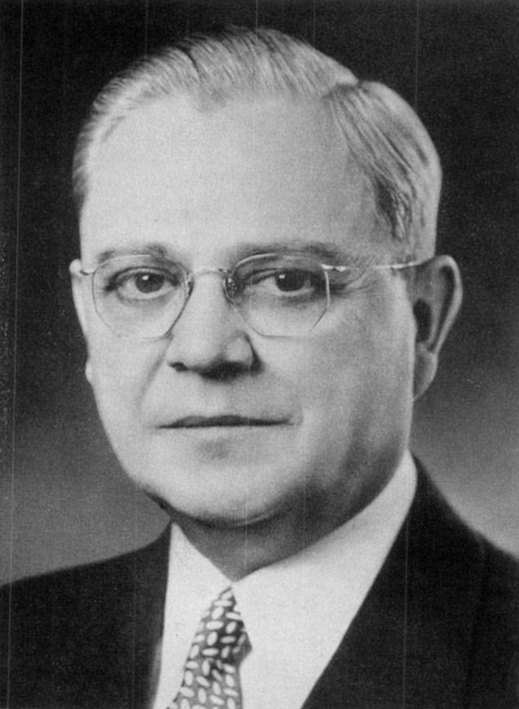
- Born: September 23, 1894; New Grand Chain, Illinois
- Died: November 12, 1961 (aged 67); Chicago, Illinois
- Education: University of Illinois; Harvard Law School
- Occupation: Jurist

George Washington Bristow (September 23, 1894 – November 12, 1961) was an American jurist.

Born in New Grand Chain, Illinois, Bristow served in the United States Army during World War I. He graduated from University of Illinois and went to Harvard Law School. Bristow was admitted to the Illinois bar in 1920. He lived in Paris, Illinois. Bristow served as state's attorney for Edgar County, Illinois, as master in chancery for Edgar County, and as Edgar County Circuit Court judge. Bristow was a Republican. From 1951 until his death in 1961, Bristow served in the Illinois Supreme Court and was chief justice. Bristow died in the University of Illinois Hospital in Chicago, Illinois after major surgery. Bristow had pancreatic cancer.
