= Eddie Randle =

American jazz musician

Eddie Randle (born May 27, 1907, Villa Ridge, Illinois – May 9, 1997 in St. Louis) was an American Jazz trumpeter and band leader. He was leader of the band, Eddie Randle and his Blue Devils.

During his career Randle hired a number of young local musicians in St. Louis, who would go on to be famous jazz performers, including Miles Davis, Clark Terry, Jimmy Forrest, Willie Akins.

"Randle was business agent for the St. Louis musicians’ union, Local 197 during the 1940s."
