= John Morton Eshleman =

American politician

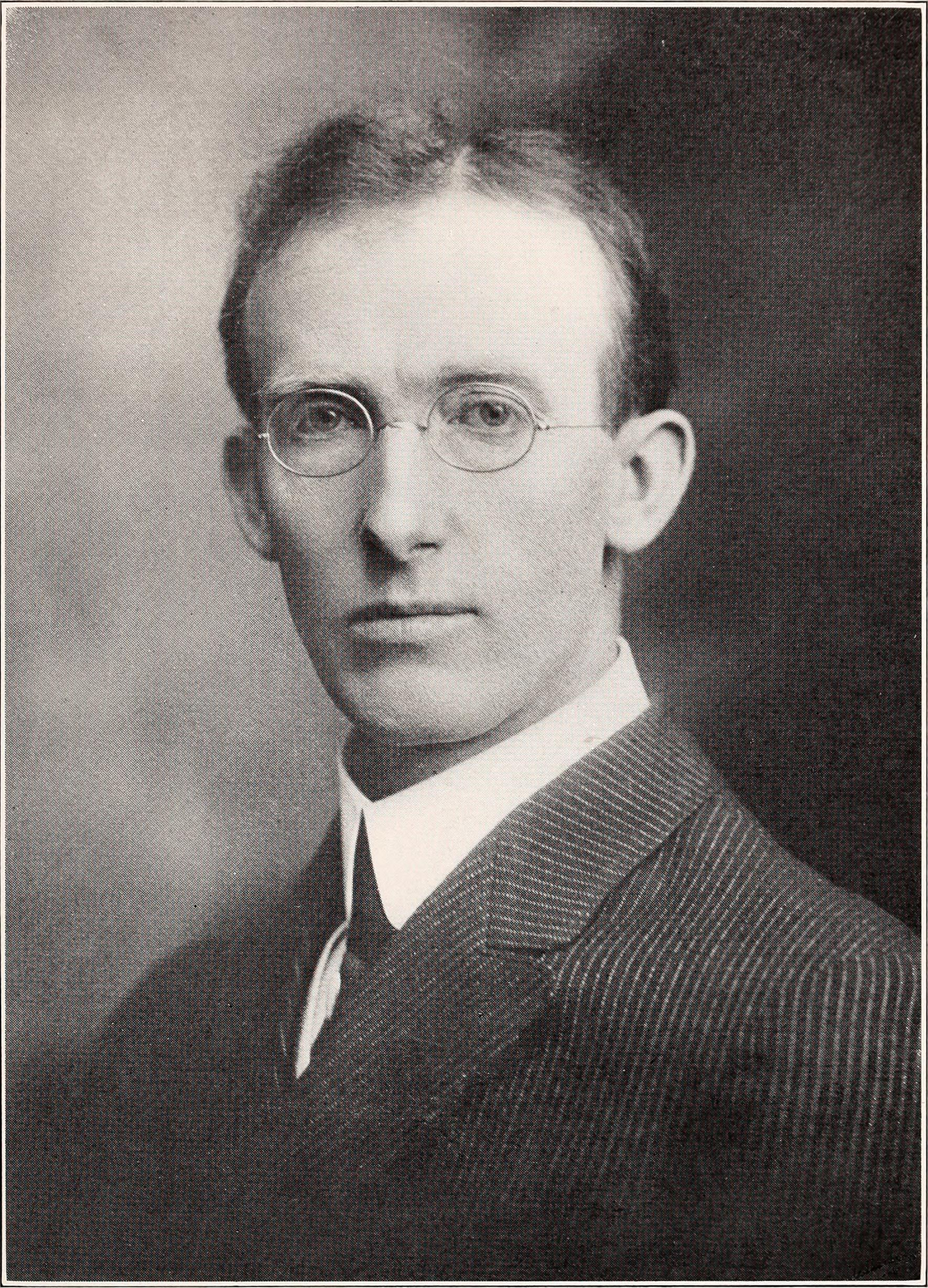
- Eshleman, c. 1915

26th Lieutenant Governor of California
- In office January 5, 1915 – February 28, 1916
- Governor: Hiram Johnson
- Preceded by: Albert Joseph Wallace
- Succeeded by: William Stephens

Member of the California State Assembly from the 52nd district
- In office January 7, 1907 – January 4, 1909
- Preceded by: William H. Waste
- Succeeded by: C. C. Young

Personal details
- Born: June 14, 1876 Villa Ridge, Illinois
- Died: February 28, 1916 (aged 39) Indio, California
- Party: Republican; Progressive
- Spouse: Elizabeth Ledgett
- Children: 4
- Education: University of California, Berkeley

John Morton Eshleman (June 14, 1876 – February 28, 1916) was an American lawyer and politician from California. He was the 26th lieutenant governor of California from 1915 to 1916.

== Biography ==
A native of the Midwest, Eshleman was born in Villa Ridge, Illinois, but went west in 1896 to work on the Southern Pacific Railroad. Eshleman received his Bachelor of Arts from the University of California, Berkeley in 1902, and the next year he received his Master of Arts there. At Berkeley, he was president of the student government. Eshleman was admitted to the California Bar in 1905 and was appointed Deputy State Labor Commissioner by Governor George Pardee.

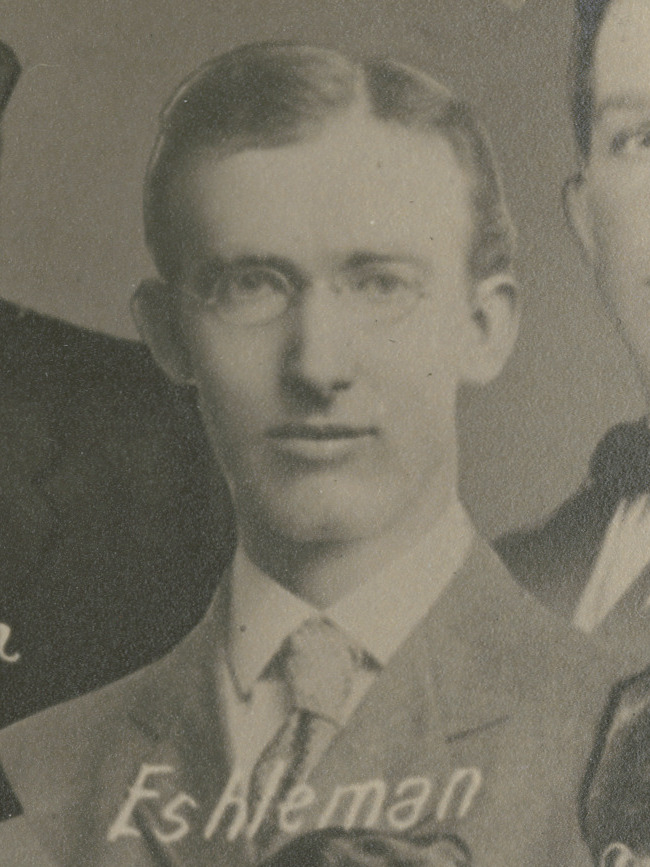
Eshleman in the State Assembly

Eshleman ran for the state legislature on a Republican and Union Labor ticket and was elected to the 38th California Assembly from the 52d District (Berkeley) in 1907. Though appointed Deputy District Attorney of Alameda County, he did not serve, moving instead to the Imperial Valley in Southern California for the dry air because of his poor health. When Imperial County was created from the eastern part of San Diego County in August 1907, Eshleman was chosen to be the first District Attorney of the county, serving from 1907 to 1910.

In 1910, Eshleman was elected to the third district seat on the California Railroad Commission with the backing of the progressive Lincoln-Roosevelt League. He was subsequently elected chair of the commission upon taking office in 1911. Eshleman was elected Lieutenant Governor as a Progressive in 1914. Inaugurated January 5, 1915, he served until his death under Governor Hiram Johnson. Eshleman died in 1916 in Indio, California, after a long battle with tuberculosis, and was buried in Inglewood Park Cemetery in Inglewood, California. His remains were moved to Sunset View Cemetery in El Cerrito, California, in 1956. Johnson appointed William Stephens to replace Eshleman as lieutenant governor. Eshleman also served as an ex officio regent of the University of California by virtue of his office as lieutenant governor.

== Personal life ==
Eshleman married Elizabeth Ledgett in 1906. His son, also named John Morton "Jack", was a newspaper reporter and wrote detective novels set in the Bay Area. Jack was an activist for labor rights and, during World War II, helped bring about the demise of "auxiliary" (segregated) unions in the Kaiser shipyards. His daughter, Jane Eshleman Conant, was a pioneering woman writer for San Francisco newspapers from 1941 to 1976. Eshleman also had two other children, Kathryn Eshleman Wahl, a women's editor at the Oakland Tribune, and Robert T. Eshleman, a prominent Bay Area attorney. His daughters were the first two women's editors at The Daily Californian, which was housed in the original building named for their father.

== Legacy ==
The student union at UC Berkeley was named Eshleman Hall in his honor; this building was later renamed Moses Hall. A new building (1965) called Eshleman Hall was subsequently erected, which housed various student groups including the campus newspaper, The Daily Californian. Eshleman Hall was demolished in the summer of 2013 and rebuilt in 2015.

Political offices
Preceded by William H. Waste	California State Assemblyman, 52nd District; 1907–1909	Succeeded by C. C. Young
Preceded by Albert Joseph Wallace	Lieutenant Governor of California; 1915–1916	Succeeded by William Stephens
