= This Is My Last Affair =

Single by Ella Fitzgerald
- A-side: "Darktown Strutters' Ball"
- Released: December 1936
- Recorded: November 18, 1936
- Genre: jazz
- Length: 2:41
- Label: Decca
- Songwriter: Haven Johnson

"My Last Affair" (sometimes This Is My Last Affair) is a song written by Haven Johnson and introduced by Billie Haywood in the Broadway musical revue New Faces of 1936. Popular recordings in 1937 were by Mildred Bailey; Teddy Wilson and His Orchestra (vocal by Billie Holiday); and by Jimmie Lunceford and His Orchestra.

== Other notable recordings ==
- Ella Fitzgerald - a single release for Decca Records (catalog 1061) in 1936 and for the album Ella and Basie! (1963)
- Lionel Hampton and His Orchestra, recorded for Victor Records (catalog No. 25527A) on February 8, 1937.
- Peggy Lee - a transcription session in 1945.
- The Serenaders c.1950.

This poetic tune also had been recorded on '78 Radio Transcription Disk, presented by Violet Wanita Hamilton on NBC Radio, within a Three X Sisters song set in 1937.
