= Mary Small =

American singer (1922–2007)

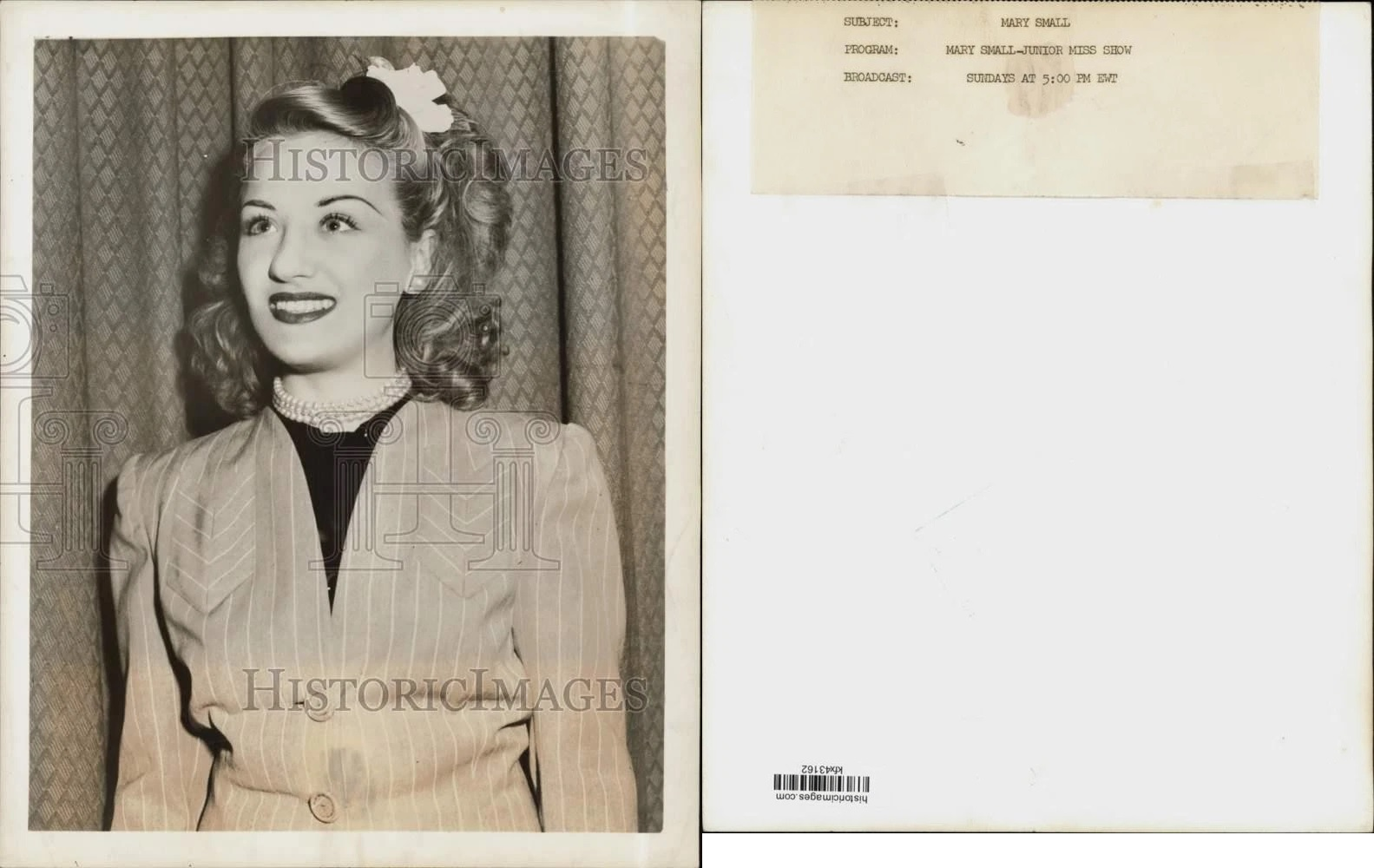
- Born: Harriette Mary Small; May 14, 1922; Baltimore, Maryland, U.S.
- Died: February 27, 2007 (aged 84); New York City, U.S.
- Occupations: Singer, actress, radio personality
- Years active: 1928–2007; her death

Mary Small (May 10, 1922 – February 27, 2007) was a singing personality during the Golden Age of Radio and hosted her own broadcasts for 14 consecutive years across all major networks. She headlined or opened at "presentation houses" from the 1930s through the 1950s including the Paramount Theater, Madison Square Garden, the London Palladium, the Copacabana with Sammy Davis Jr., and the Palace Theater in Chicago.

In addition to being an established recording artist, she was a published author and performed on film, television and Broadway during her career. She was the first singer to be widely promoted as The Little Girl With The Big Voice, a moniker likely adopted by her first manager Ed Wolfe that was marketed in the Fleischer Brothers' Love Thy Neighbor, distributed by Paramount Pictures in 1934. The moniker "Little Girl With The Big Voice" was subsequently used to promote female singing prodigies from Judy Garland to Jackie Evancho. She was married for a time to the composer Vic Mizzy with whom she had a widely publicized divorce. Her life is the subject of a documentary by Rafael Moscatel.

== Early years ==
Small was born in Baltimore, Maryland to Jack and Fannie Small. Her father was a local vaudevillian and her mother a homemaker. She first performed on Baltimore radio station WBAL at the age of six or seven and at nine won a radio contest hosted by Gus Edwards. She had a younger sister named Gloria. The story of how she was discovered was widely reported in newspapers, cartoon strips and interviews well into her later years She was interviewed by Joe Franklin in 1972.

In 1933, at the age of eleven she was introduced to singing trio the Three X Sisters at the Hippodrome Theater on Eutaw Street in Baltimore. The trio arranged for her an audition with their manager Ed Wolfe who then booked her on the Rudy Vallee Hour on NBC affiliate WEAF New York where she received her first big break singing Louisville Lady. Mary's voice was unique for that of a child, almost freakish to some, and the audience disbelief as to her age captivated America. Within a month she had landed her own show on NBC which led into Frank Sinatra's hour. Along with a selected stable of stars, they were promoted across the country on matchbooks, bottle caps and subway cars. While a child in New York she attended the Professional Children's School. Her childhood friend was Baby Rose Marie.

== Golden Age Of Radio ==
Small was successful on radio throughout the 1930s and 1940s and either hosted or was featured on a number of programs. She worked with the biggest bands and orchestras of the day including Tommy Dorsey, Ray Bloch, Glenn Miller and with stars like Roy Rogers, Dean Martin, Jerry Lewis, Jackie Gleason and Frank Sinatra. She had a number of announcers for her programs over the years including Bud Collyer and Milton Cross who was best known as the voice of the Metropolitan Opera for 43 years.

She was interviewed by David Siegel on September 24, 1999, for his book Remembering Radio: An Oral History of Old Time Radio and quoted as saying:

Then, I got my own radio show, which I just mentioned was fifteen minutes, five nights a week, which Frank Sinatra followed, and we knew each other pretty well. Me with my little white socks, he with his long pants, but he had just left the Tommy Dorsey Band and I came in at 11:00 with Walter Gross' Orchestra, a seventeen-piece live band. I rehearsed during the afternoon, and there was a commercial break of about sixty seconds, and Frank Sinatra came in at 11:15. He was billed as the voice that is thrilling millions.

Throughout her career she was employed by NBC, ABC and CBS and the Mutual Broadcasting Company.

=== Partial list of radio credits ===
- Ben Bernie (1933–1936)
- Little Miss Bab-O's Surprise Party (1934–1935)
- The Maxwell House Showboat (1937)
- Riding High (1937)
- Keep It Dark (1941)
- Imperial Time (1941)
- Keep 'Em Rolling (1942-01-25)
- The Chamber Music Society Of Lower Basin Street (1942)
- The Kemtone Hour (1944)
- The Mary Small Show (1944)
- The Mary Small-Junior Miss Show (1944-1946)
- Music For Millions (1945)
- By Popular Demand (1945)
- Dorothy Kilgallen's Diary (1945)
- Guest Star Program (1947)
- Three for the Money (1948)
- Behind The Mike (1940)
- Your Hit Parade (1940s)

== World War II and the USO ==
Throughout WW2 and beyond, radio stations' programming played a role in the war effort. Mary's ballads were swapped out for patriotic songs and she worked with the Treasury Department participating in US bond rallies where she shared the stage doing spots with actors like Jimmy Stewart. Mary also joined Pearl Hamilton, one of The Three X Sisters, to tour with the USO in 1943 or 1944 and sang the song Smile, America, Smile. She also toured with B.A. Rolfe's Daughters Of Uncle Sam in 1942.

=== "Thank You, Mr. President" ===
In 1942, at the March of Dimes event celebrating Franklin Roosevelt's 60th birthday, Mary performed her own song, "Thank you, Mr. President," backed by the Glenn Miller orchestra and broadcast live from the Waldorf Astoria. This recording can be heard at The Little Girl With The Big Voice.

== Stage and recording career ==
Small performed as a headliner and recorded consistently from 1934 through the 1950s. Her image appears on dozens of sheet music titles. After leaving showbiz to raise two daughters, she returned to Broadway in 1966 and toured with a new Follies cast. She also expanded into dramatic theater playing the role of Lenny Bruce's mother in a play about his life.

A number of her recordings and television performances can be found at the website The Little Girl With The Big Voice. A comprehensive CD of her recordings from the late 1940s and 50s was released in 2013 by Jasmine Records

In 1954, after a show at the Copacabana with Sammy Davis Jr., Richard Nixon and his wife Pat stopped by. Afterwards the then Vice President made his way to the dressing rooms to thank them for the show. The papers noted Mary as saying They applauded me as if I were a Republican!

=== Partial list of stage credits ===
- Little Me (1982)
- Sextet (1974)
- Early to Bed (1944)
- Lenny (1974)
- Stephen Sondheim's Follies (1974)
- Goldilocks (1982)

== Film and television ==
In 1930s Small began performing at the Paramount Theater between films and newsreels to draw in bigger crowds and then as a solo act. In 1934, Max Fleischer hired Mary to appear in one of his community-sing "Bouncing Ball" cartoons, Love Thy Neighbor, filmed at his New York studio. She appeared on camera, singing the title song.

=== Partial list of film and television credits ===
- American Minstrels (1949)
- Love Thy Neighbor (1934)
- Versatile Varieties (1949-1950)
- The Ed Sullivan Show (1952–1954)
- The Buick-Berle Show (1949)
- Rare Records (released 2013)

== Later years ==
In her later years, Small worked as a sought after vocal coach and performed in nightclubs in Manhattan. At the time of her death she had outlived most of her contemporaries. Most of her life's work was not comprehensively cataloged until 2012.
