= Vertna Saunders =

American jazz musician

Vertna Saunders was an African-American cornettist and trumpet player based in the Missouri jazz scene of the early 20th century. Saunders was in the University of Kansas Band and became established as a jazz musician in Kansas City, Missouri. He visited New Orleans while performing on a riverboat. Saunders joined Eddie Johnson's band in 1934 and worked with Lester Young at that time. He learned to read music from a fellow jazz musician.

Saunders performed with the St. Louis Blue Devils in the late 1930s and early 1940s, with performances at the Villa Valencia Club in Springfield, Illinois. He first encountered Miles Davis while playing with Buggs Roberts at the West End Waiters Club. In the 1940s, both Saunders and Davis played with St. Louis Blue Devils under the leadership of Eddie Randle, who was also treasurer of the black musicians union in St. Louis. He was one of many St. Louis jazz musicians, white and black, who served in various military branches during WWII. He performed with Singleton Palmer’s band in 1952. He served in the Army until his discharge in 1956. Saunders was interviewed by Dan Havens on April 5, 1982, for the National Ragtime and Jazz Archive, located in Lovejoy Library at Southern Illinois University Edwardsville.
