= New Grand Chain, Illinois =

Grand Chain
- Village
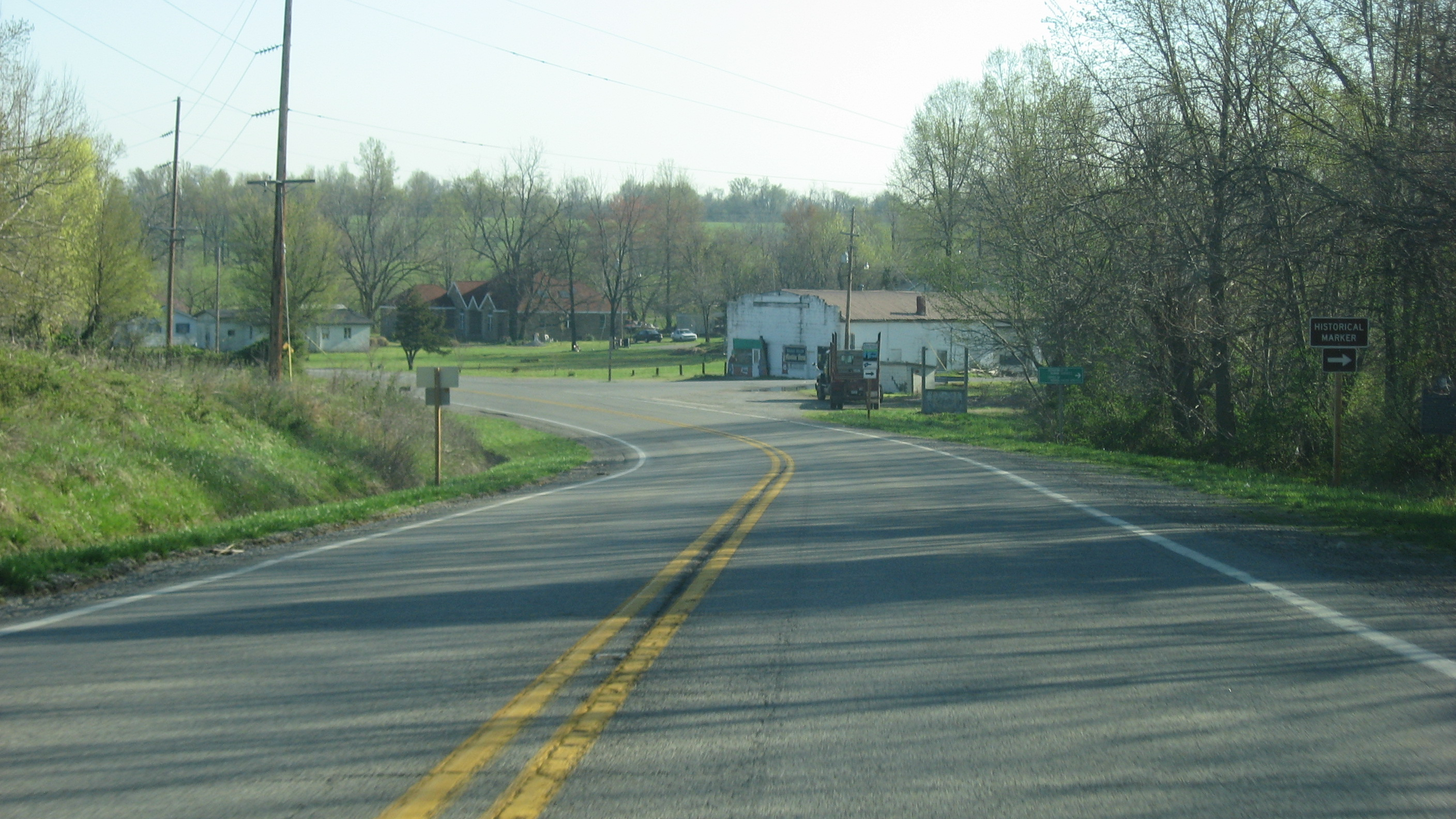
- Illinois Route 37 in the village
- Nickname: Grand Chain
- Location of New Grand Chain in Pulaski County, Illinois.

- Location of Illinois in the United States
- Coordinates: 37°15′13″N 89°1′13″W
- Country: United States
- State: Illinois
- County: Pulaski

Area
  - Total: 1.06 sq mi (2.74 km^{2})
  - Land: 1.04 sq mi (2.70 km^{2})
  - Water: 0.015 sq mi (0.04 km^{2})
- Elevation: 410 ft (120 m)

Population (2020)
  - Total: 150
  - Density: 143.8/sq mi (55.54/km^{2})
- Time zone: UTC-6 (CST)
  - Summer (DST): UTC-5 (CDT)
- ZIP Code(s): 62941
- Area code: 618
- FIPS code: 17-52467
- GNIS feature ID: 2399463
- Wikimedia Commons: Grand Chain, Illinois

Grand Chain is a village in Pulaski County, Illinois, United States. As of the 2020 census, New Grand Chain had a population of 150. The village's official name changed from "Grand Chain" to "New Grand Chain" in the 1970s, but its residents continue to refer to it as "Grand Chain."

== Geography ==
Grand Chain is located at 37°15′13″N 89°1′13″W (37.253578, -89.020361).

According to the 2010 census, Grand Chain has a total area of 1.055 square miles (2.73 km^{2}), of which 1.04 square miles (2.69 km^{2}) (or 98.58%) is land and 0.015 square miles (0.04 km^{2}) (or 1.42%) is water.

== Demographics ==
Historical population
Census	Pop.	Note	%±
1880	88		—
1900	451		—
1910	490		8.6%
1920	397		−19.0%
1930	373		−6.0%
1940	406		8.8%
1950	330		−18.7%
1960	282		−14.5%
1970	215		−23.8%
1980	232		7.9%
1990	273		17.7%
2000	233		−14.7%
2010	210		−9.9%
2020	150		−28.6%
U.S. Decennial Census

As of the census of 2000, there were 233 people, 99 households, and 63 families residing in the village. The population density was 220.2 inhabitants per square mile (85.0/km^{2}). There were 121 housing units at an average density of 114.3 per square mile (44.1/km^{2}). The racial makeup of the village was 90.99% White and 9.01% African American.

There were 99 households, out of which 31.3% had children under the age of 18 living with them, 48.5% were married couples living together, 13.1% had a female householder with no husband present, and 35.4% were non-families. 34.3% of all households were made up of individuals, and 15.2% had someone living alone who was 65 years of age or older. The average household size was 2.35 and the average family size was 3.03.

In the village, the population was spread out, with 25.8% under the age of 18, 8.2% from 18 to 24, 26.6% from 25 to 44, 21.0% from 45 to 64, and 18.5% who were 65 years of age or older. The median age was 38 years. For every 100 females, there were 94.2 males. For every 100 females age 18 and over, there were 94.4 males.

The median income for a household in the village was $29,688, and the median income for a family was $36,500. Males had a median income of $38,750 versus $14,375 for females. The per capita income for the village was $14,617. About 21.7% of families and 21.5% of the population were below the poverty line, including 32.4% of those under the age of eighteen and 15.0% of those 65 or over.

== Notable people ==
- George W. Bristow, Chief Justice of the Illinois Supreme Court, was born in Grand Chain.
- Laura Jacinta Rittenhouse (1841–1911), temperance worker, author, poet, orphanage manager, clubwoman
