= Laura J. Rittenhouse =

American poet (1841–1911)

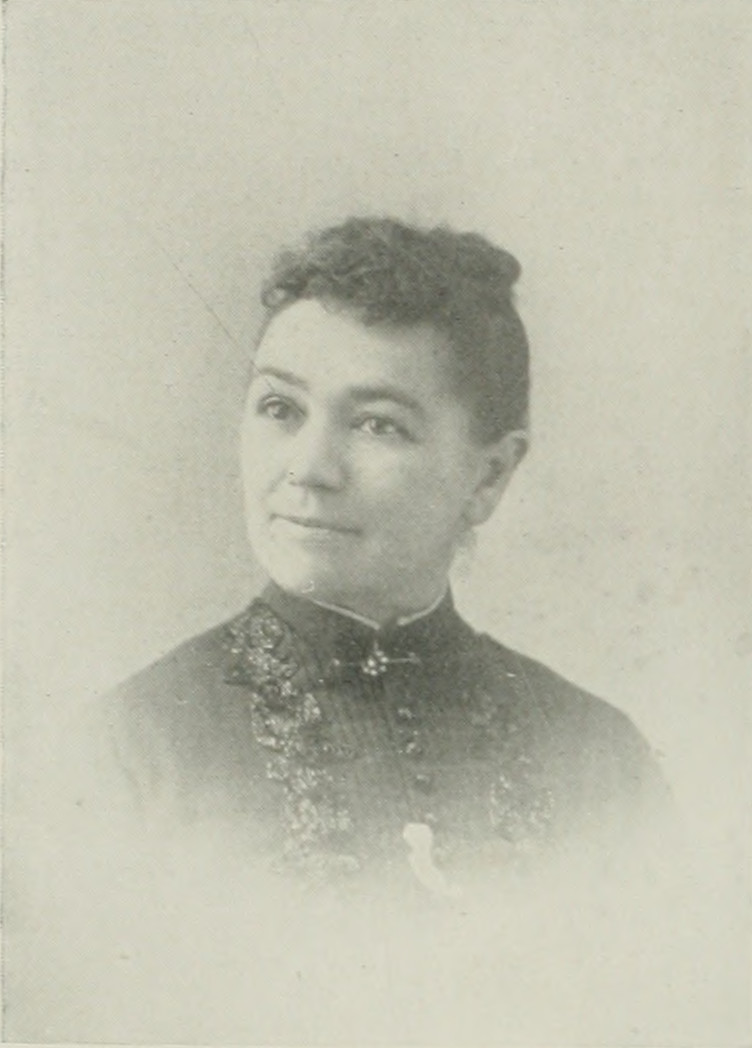
- Photo in A Woman of the Century
- Born: Laura Jacinta Arter; April 30, 1841; Grand Chain, Illinois, U.S.
- Died: July 11, 1911 (aged 70); Chicago, Illinois, U.S.
- Resting place: Cairo City Cemetery, in Villa Ridge, Illinois
- Occupations: activist, author, poet, business woman, club-woman
- Spouse: Wood Rittenhouse (m. 1863; died 1896)
- Children: 4
- Writing career
- Notable work: "Out of the Depths"

Signature
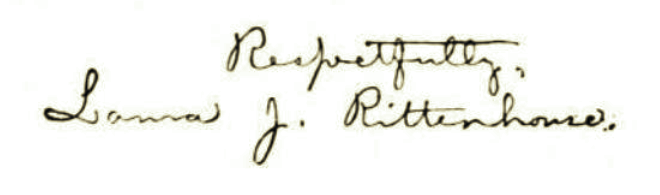

Laura J. Rittenhouse (née, Arter; April 30, 1841 – July 11, 1911) was an American temperance activist, juvenile literature author, poet, businesswoman, and club-woman of the long nineteenth century. She was the author of the poem, "Out of the Depths". In Cairo, Illinois, she was affiliated with the Woman's Christian Temperance Union (WCTU), Presbyterian Woman's Aid Society, Red Cross Society, Social Science Association, Centennial Association, Women's Library Club, and Protestant Orphan Asylum. For many years, Rittenhouse served as manager of the city's orphanage.

== Early life and education ==
Laura Jacinta Arter was born in Grand Chain, Pulaski County, Illinois, near the Ohio River, April 30, 1841. She was a daughter of Dr. Daniel Arter. From her parents she inherited her tastes and talent for literature.

Her education occurred in the schools of the sparsely-settled county, but she supplemented her deficient schooling by self-study and wide reading.

== Career ==
During the early 1890s, she was a frequent contributor to magazines and newspapers. Her best work was done in her short stories. She was skillful at writing plots, and working out the stories to their logical ending.

For years, her interests were given to the work of the WCTU, and for that organization, she worked and wrote unceasingly. She was the first president of the WCTU of Cairo, Illinois, serving in that office for many years. She was elected district president of the Cairo WCTU for four consecutive years, and for five years, she also served as district treasurer.

She served as president (three years) of the Presbyterian Woman's Aid Society in Cairo, and vice-president of the Red Cross Society in Cairo. She served as secretary of the Social Science Association in Cairo, secretary of the Centennial Association in Cairo, for a year, as secretary of the Cairo Women's Library Club. She was the secretary of the Cairo Protestant Orphan Asylum, and for many years, was manager of the orphanage.

== Personal life ==
In Pulaski County, December 31, 1863, she married Wood Rittenhouse (1835–1896), a businessman of Cairo, Illinois. Their family included one daughter and four sons: Isabella Maud, Wood Arter, Harry H., Fred M. and Robin C. Rittenhouse.

Laura Rittenhouse died on July 11, 1911, in Chicago, Illinois. She was buried at Cairo City Cemetery, in Villa Ridge, Illinois.

== Selected works ==
=== Poetry ===
- "Out of the Depths"

=== Short stories ===
- "Richard Graham's Love"
