= Fred C. Wheeler =

American politician (1867–1934)

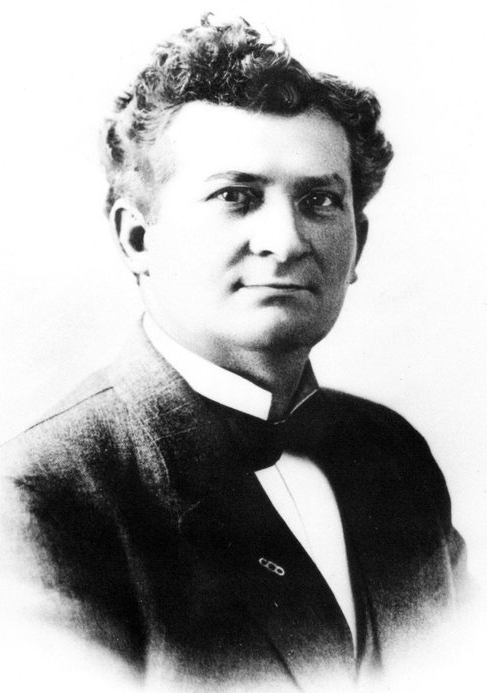
- Wheeler, c. 1913

Member of the Los Angeles City Council for the at-large district
- In office July 5, 1921 – June 30, 1925
- In office July 1, 1913 – July 1, 1917

Personal details
- Born: September 18, 1867 Rushford, Minnesota, U.S.
- Died: November 3, 1934 (aged 67) Los Angeles, California, U.S.
- Party: Socialist (before 1915); Republican (after 1915)
- Spouse: Lucina Cook
- Children: 1
- Occupation: Labor leader, politician

Fredrick Crissman Wheeler (September 18, 1867 – November 23, 1934) was an American Socialist labor leader and politician who served on the Los Angeles City Council from 1913 to 1917 and again from 1921 to 1925. In 1909, he came within "a narrow plurality" of being elected mayor of the city.

== Career ==
=== Labor movement ===
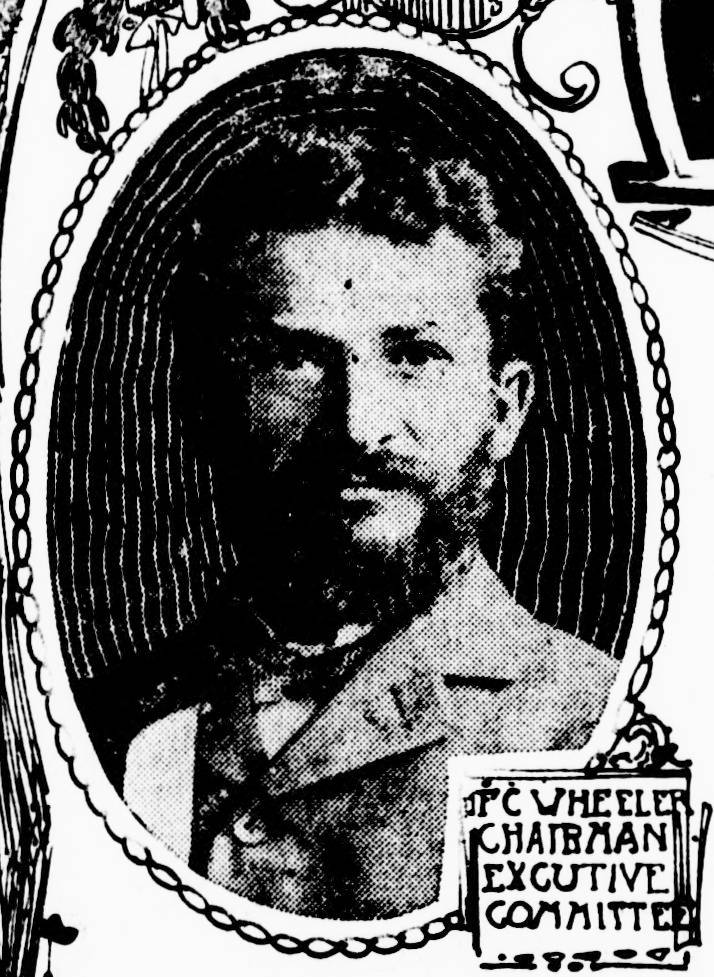
Wheeler as chairman of the executive committee of the Los Angeles Council of Labor, 1901

Wheeler was active in early 20th-century labor movement in California. In 1905, he was state organizer of the California Federation of Labor. He was in 1907 one of the promoters of the Union Labor News Company, which aimed to publish a daily newspaper to cover news of labor union activities. By 1908, Wheeler was head of Carpenters Union Los Angeles Local 158, which was the "largest local carpenters union in the world".

By 1909, Wheeler was active in the Socialist Party of America. That year, he ran for mayor of Los Angeles in a recall election for mayor Arthur C. Harper. He was at first denied a place on the ballot because his candidacy had allegedly not followed regulations. The denial was overturned by a judicial appeal. Harper resigned the mayor's position, and in the election to succeed him, Wheeler lost to George Alexander by a "narrow plurality" of 1,650 votes of some 35,000 cast. It was the first election "ever held in any American city for the recall of a mayor". The Associated Press reported that "the vote for Wheeler was a great surprise".

=== Los Angeles City Council (1913–1925) ===
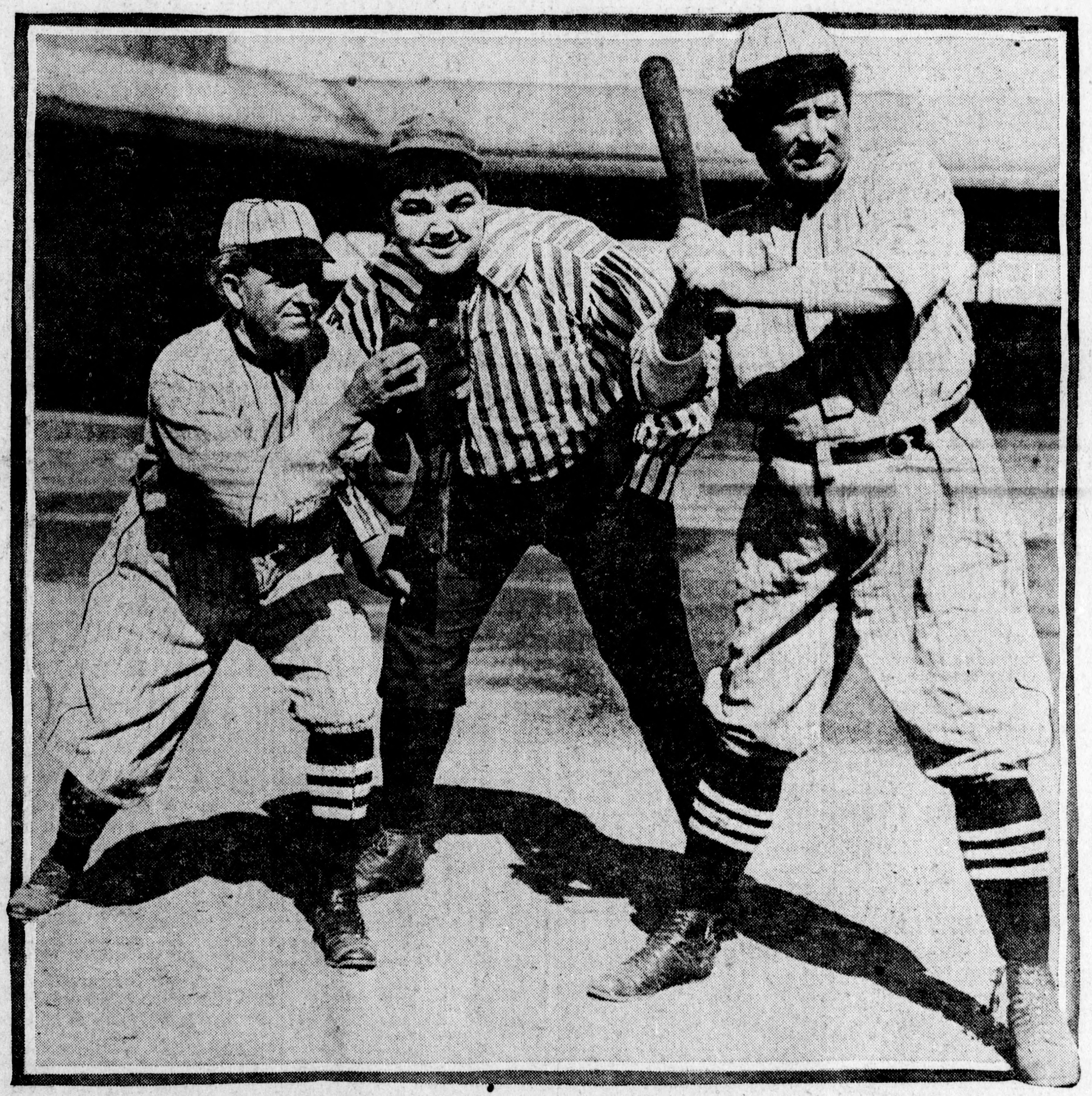
Wheeler (right) plays baseball with comedian Josh Binney (center) and fellow city councilman W. A. Roberts, 1915

In 1910, Wheeler was the Socialist Party nominee for Lieutenant Governor of California. He was a member of a freeholders board to propose a new city charter in 1912. He and other members were active in proposing the use of proportional representation in any new charter; the proposal lost in a tie vote of board members.

In 1913, Wheeler was elected to the Los Angeles City Council, receiving the fourth-highest number of votes of the nine successful candidates. In 1915, Wheeler was renominated for the council and polled the second-highest number of votes among ninety candidates. Soon, Wheeler was instrumental in a campaign to establish a Los Angeles Department of Water and Power. Historian Jeff Stansbury wrote that:

Wheeler led a successful fight against an attempt to split the power-bond issue into two separate ballot propositions, one to complete the aqueduct's generating stations, the other to create a city-owned distribution system. Such a division would probably have doomed public power.

Also in 1915, Wheeler defended City Council member Estelle Lawton Lindsey, who was ousted from the Socialist Party, and then he himself announced he was leaving it. He later became a Republican.

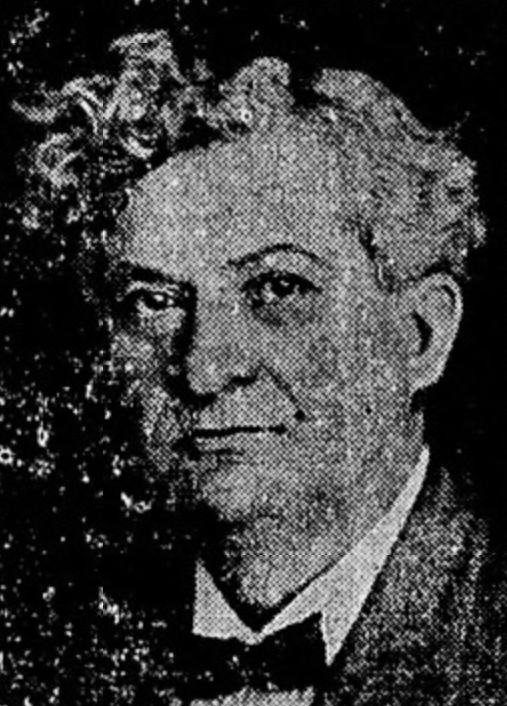
Wheeler in 1923

Wheeler, as a candidate for City Council in 1919, was supported by the Civic Betterment Association but opposed by the Merchants and Manufacturers Association, whose president, H. B. Woodhill, said of him: "[...] we cannot stand for Wheeler, [who was] the man who deliberately took occasion in an address given before a large gathering in Lincoln Park to declare, 'To hell with the newspapers,' and in the City Council he turned to a crowd of red anarchists and called them 'My brothers.'"

"The Watchman", a political column that ran in the Los Angeles Times, said of the councilman in 1919: "Wheeler opposed the City Council on city employees taking part in the Preparedness Day parade, opposed the buying of flags for city employees to carry in this parade, and refused to ride with the City Council in the parade".

Wheeler introduced a resolution, adopted unanimously by the City Council in February 1922, that the chief of police should grant a permit for the use of fireworks in Los Angeles during Chinese New Year. "It will not cost the city of Los Angeles anything, and it will give the Chinese a good deal of pleasure", he said.

== Post-political career ==
He retired in 1925 after five terms in the council, asking voters to choose A. J. Barnes as his successor. He said he, Wheeler, would "engage in building work, as he was a builder before he entered public life".

Wheeler appeared in court along with four other retired or active city officials in 1928 to deny a claim by E.E. Sweeney, former land and tax agent of the Southern California Gas Company, that they had accepted "several thousand dollars" in bribes from him. In a public statement, a Los Angeles County grand jury "absolved" the officials "of any connection with Sweeney".

== Personal life and death ==
Fred Wheeler was born in 1867, the son of C.M. Wheeler of Minnesota and Elisabeth of Pennsylvania. As a youth, he was assistant captain of a football club in St. Paul, Minnesota. He had a brother, E.P. Wheeler. Fred left Minnesota for California in 1887.

He and Lucina Cook of Missouri were married in Pomona, California, on December 14, 1898. They had a daughter, Frances Wheeler (later DeShields).

In Los Angeles, they lived at 1342 Mohawk Street in the Silver Lake neighborhood.

Frederick C. Wheeler was a member of the Encino Country Club and of the California PolicyHolders' League. He was president of the League of California Municipalities in 1923.

Lucina Cook Wheeler died December 6, 1931, with a funeral in Lynwood, California. Wheeler died in Los Angeles on November 23, 1934.
