= Albert Joseph Wallace =

American politician

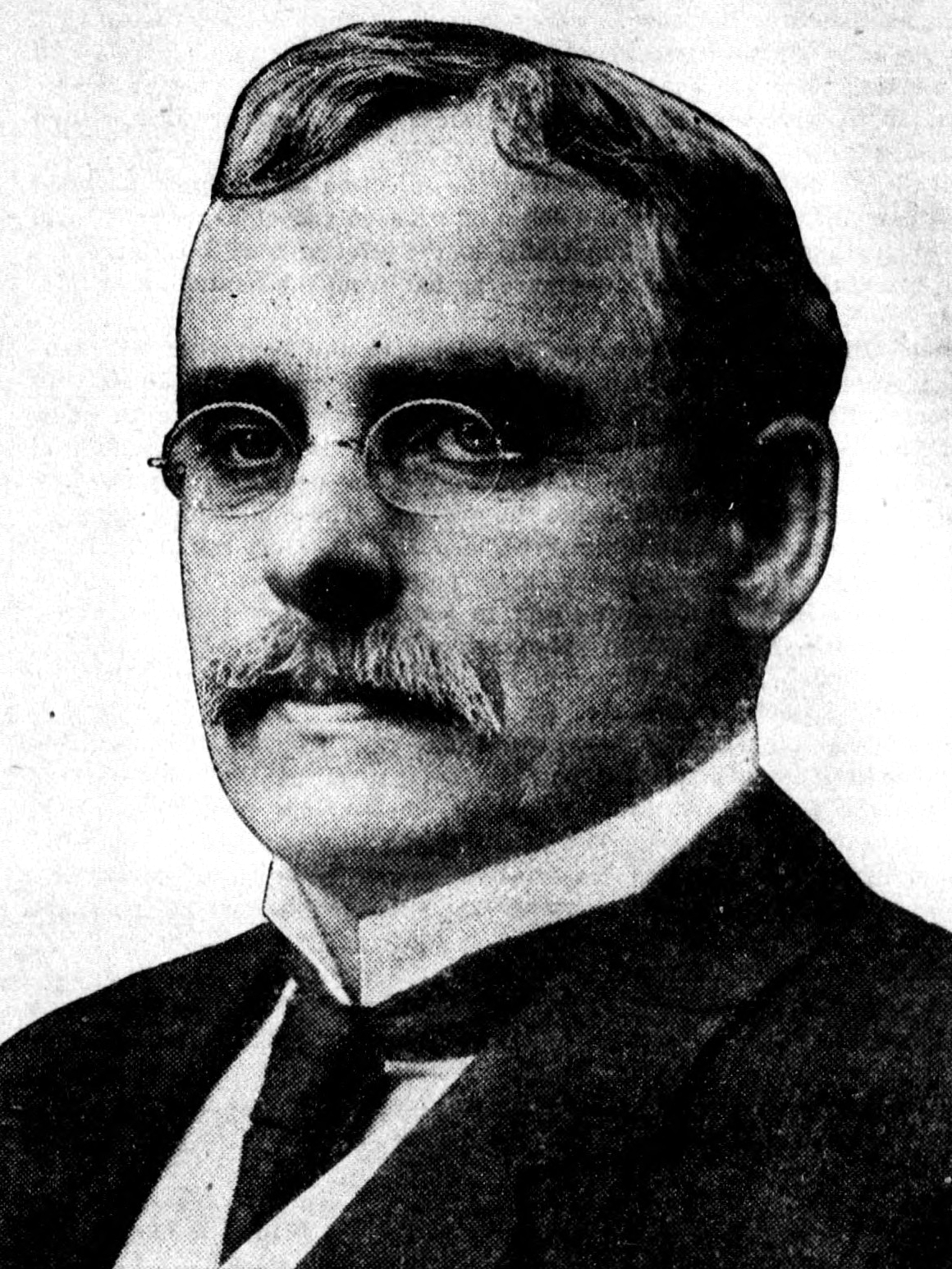
- Wallace c. 1910

25th Lieutenant Governor of California
- In office January 3, 1911 – January 5, 1915
- Preceded by: Warren R. Porter
- Succeeded by: John Morton Eshleman

Member of the Los Angeles City Council from the 5th ward
- In office December 13, 1906 – December 10, 1909
- Preceded by: George A. Smith
- Succeeded by: District eliminated

Personal details
- Born: February 11, 1853 Guelph, Canada
- Died: February 23, 1939 (aged 86) Los Angeles, California
- Party: Republican

Albert Joseph Wallace (February 11, 1853 – February 23, 1939) was a member of the Los Angeles, California, City Council in 1907–09 and the 25th lieutenant governor of California, from 1911 to 1915.

== Personal ==
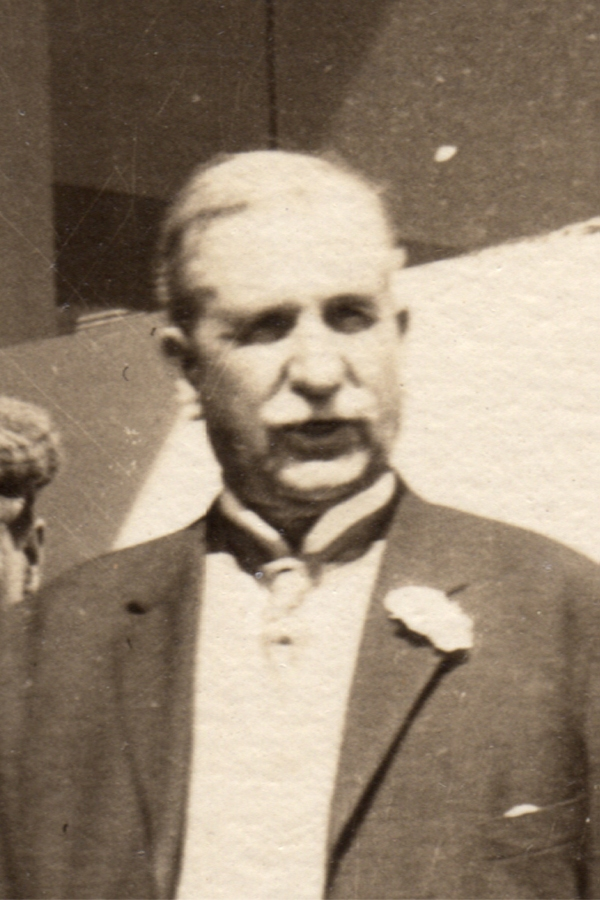
Wallace in 1911

Wallace was born on February 11, 1853, in Guelph, Canada, the son of Donald Wallace of Scotland and Harriet Lasby of England. He had nine siblings—John D., George, Francis S., Alexander H., Charles L., Frank S., Lavinia M., Matilda H. and Mary A. Albert Joseph was educated at Victoria University, Toronto. He moved to Pasadena, California, in 1886 and to Los Angeles in 1898.

Wallace was a University of Southern California regent in 1887 and received an honorary doctor of laws degree from that school in 1912. He was president of the California Anti-Saloon League and of the Los Angeles YMCA board of directors. He was identified with the development of the Methodist Church in Southern California. In 1907 Wallace was elected one of the four vice presidents of the International YMCA convention in Washington, D.C.

His first wife was Serena Healy, who died in childbirth on June 19, 1882. His second was Grace Alice Clark of Worcester, Massachusetts, whom Wallace met in Pasadena while she was vacationing there. They were married in Worcester about 1888, and after she moved to Los Angeles she became a charter member of the Ebell Club. They had four children, Kenneth Clark, Donald J., Helen Harriot and Katherine. She died on July 6, 1913. His third wife was Grace Hagar Wallace.

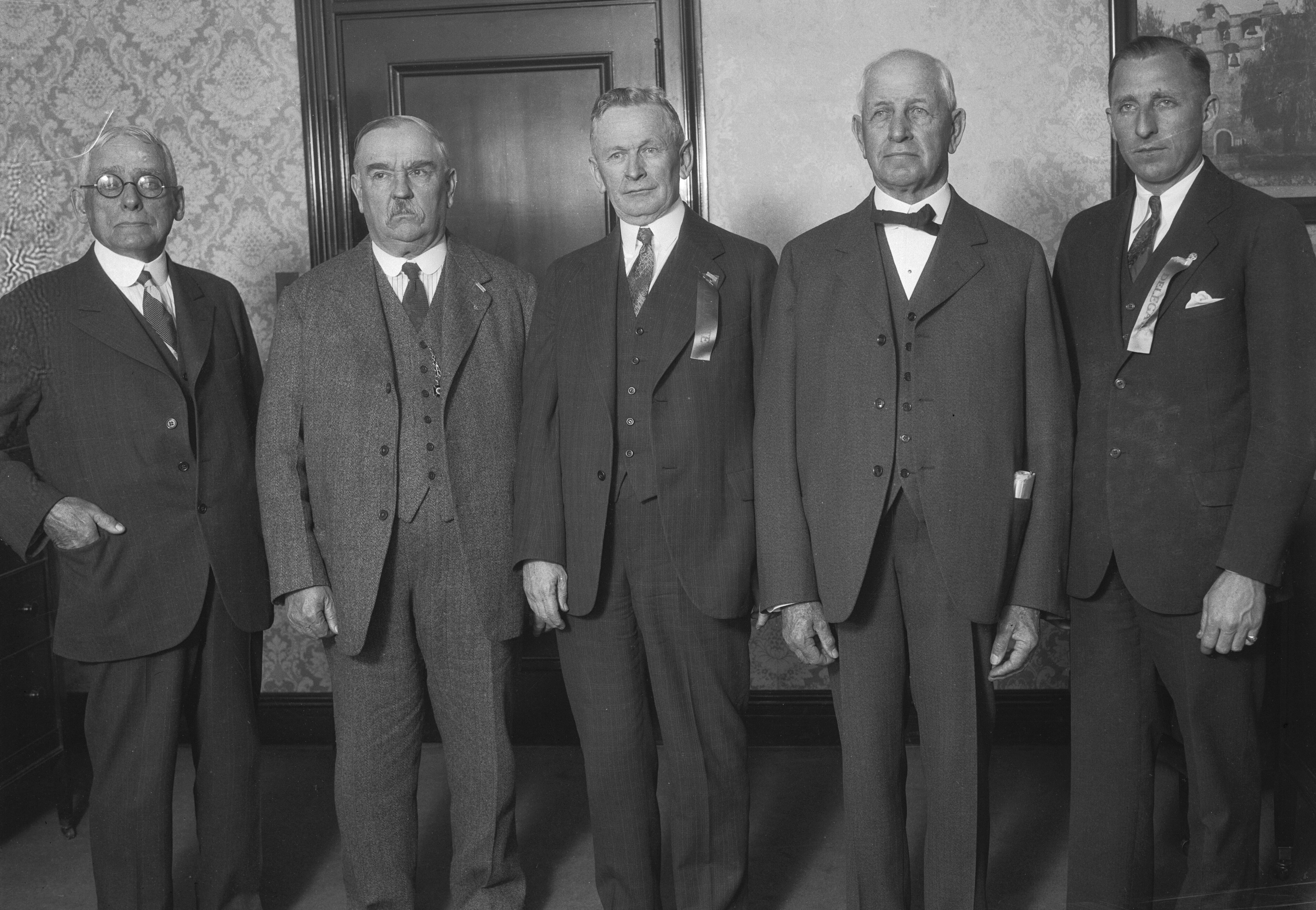
Current and former governors and lieutenant governors of California at a Herbert Hoover rally in Los Angeles, April 4, 1928. (L-R): Albert Joseph Wallace, Friend Richardson, C. C. Young, William Stephens, Buron Fitts

Wallace died at the age of 86 on February 23, 1939, in his home, 631 North McCadden Place in Hancock Park, Los Angeles. His survivors were identified in his Los Angeles Times obituary as his widow, Mrs. Grace H. Wallace; two sons, Kenneth C. Wallace of Los Angeles and Donald H. Wallace of Long Beach; two daughters, Mrs. Helen Davis of Brooklyn, New York, and Mrs. Katherine Shannon of Bedford, Pennsylvania, and a sister, Mrs. S.F. Johnson of Pasadena. A funeral service was conducted at the First Hollywood Methodist Church, with interment at with interment at Rosedale Cemetery.

Grace H. Wallace died on September 3, 1939.

== Vocation ==
Wallace was a teacher between 1869 and 1872, and he was a Methodist minister from 1872 to 1878. He was later the president of the Kendon Petroleum Company. When he lived in Pasadena he and his brother, Frank S. Wallace, were "identified with the early real estate development of the city." After moving to Los Angeles in 1898 he organized "several oil companies." He was a partner in the Ontario Water Company, and he was a director of the Euclid Oil Company, which proposed to "own and develop oil, water and mining claims." Other oil companies he helped organize were the Marengo and the Traders. As a Los Angeles real estate investor, he acquired the Bumiller Building from Isabelle M. Anderson, 1935, in exchange for his two-story building at 425 South Broadway, occupied by the W. T. Grant Company.

== Public service ==
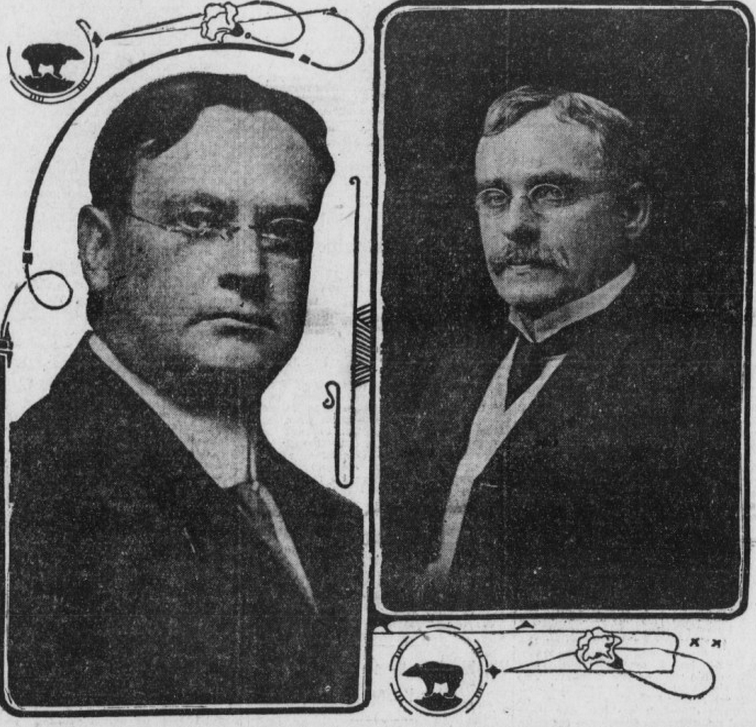
Hiram Johnson, left, and A.J. Wallace, in the Los Angeles Herald, November 9, 1910

Wallace was named a member of the board of trustees of the University of Southern California in 1895 and was board president from 1924 to 1927. On December 4, 1906, he was elected from the 5th Ward as a Republican and nonpartisan to a three-year term on the Los Angeles City Council by a vote of 2,453 for Wallace against 629 for Naelle, his Democratic opponent.

He was elected Lieutenant Governor of California in 1910, serving from 1911 to 1915, during Hiram Johnson's first term. In 1921 Wallace was a candidate for the Republican nomination for U.S. Senator, but he was defeated in the primary by Samuel Shortridge.

== Notes and references ==
Political offices
Preceded by Warren R. Porter	Lieutenant Governor of California; 1911–1915	Succeeded by John M. Eshleman
