= Warren R. Porter =

American politician (1861-1927)

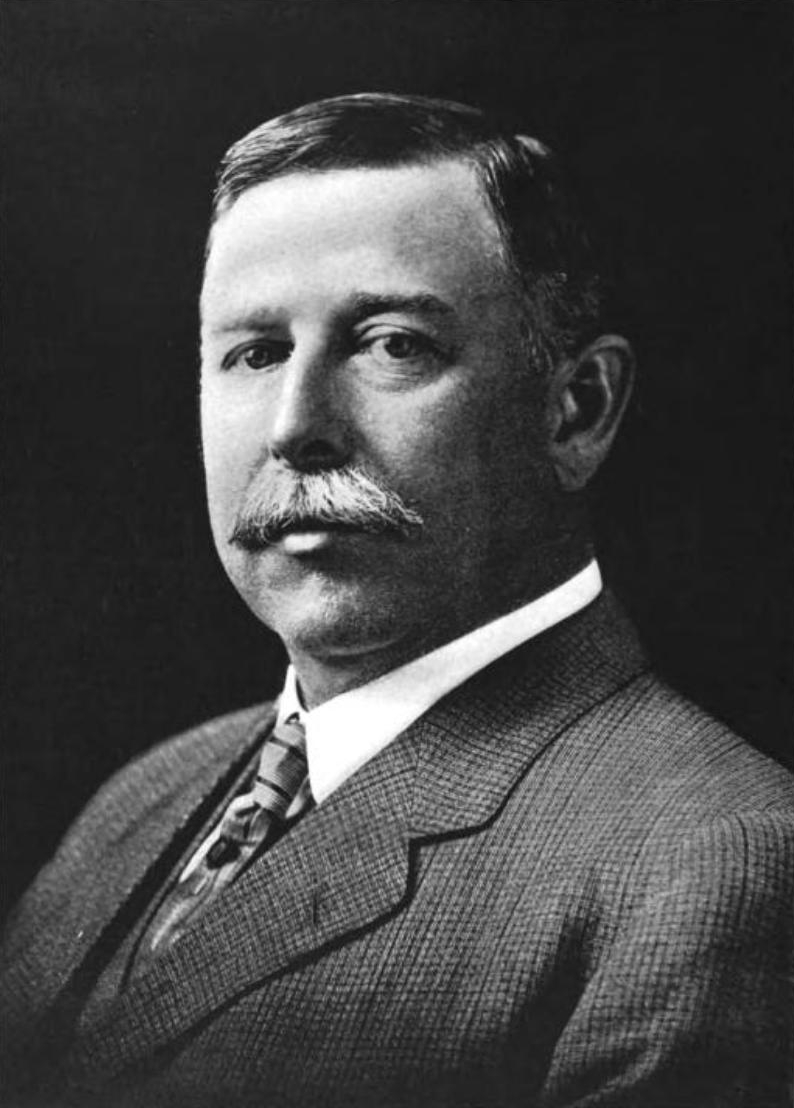
Warren R. Porter, California Lieutenant Governor

Warren Reynolds Porter (March 30, 1861 – August 27, 1927) was a Republican politician from California. He served as the 24th lieutenant governor of California, from 1907 to 1911. Porter had grown up in Watsonville, California. A businessman, he co-founded Graniterock, and before that he was board secretary for the Loma Prieta Lumber Company south of Santa Cruz. He gained popularity in the more liberal Santa Cruz County since the Republican convention was held there.

Political offices
Preceded by Alden Anderson	Lieutenant Governor of California; 1907–1911	Succeeded by A. J. Wallace
