= Villa Ridge, Illinois =

Unincorporated community in Pulaski County, Illinois, United States

- Unincorporated community
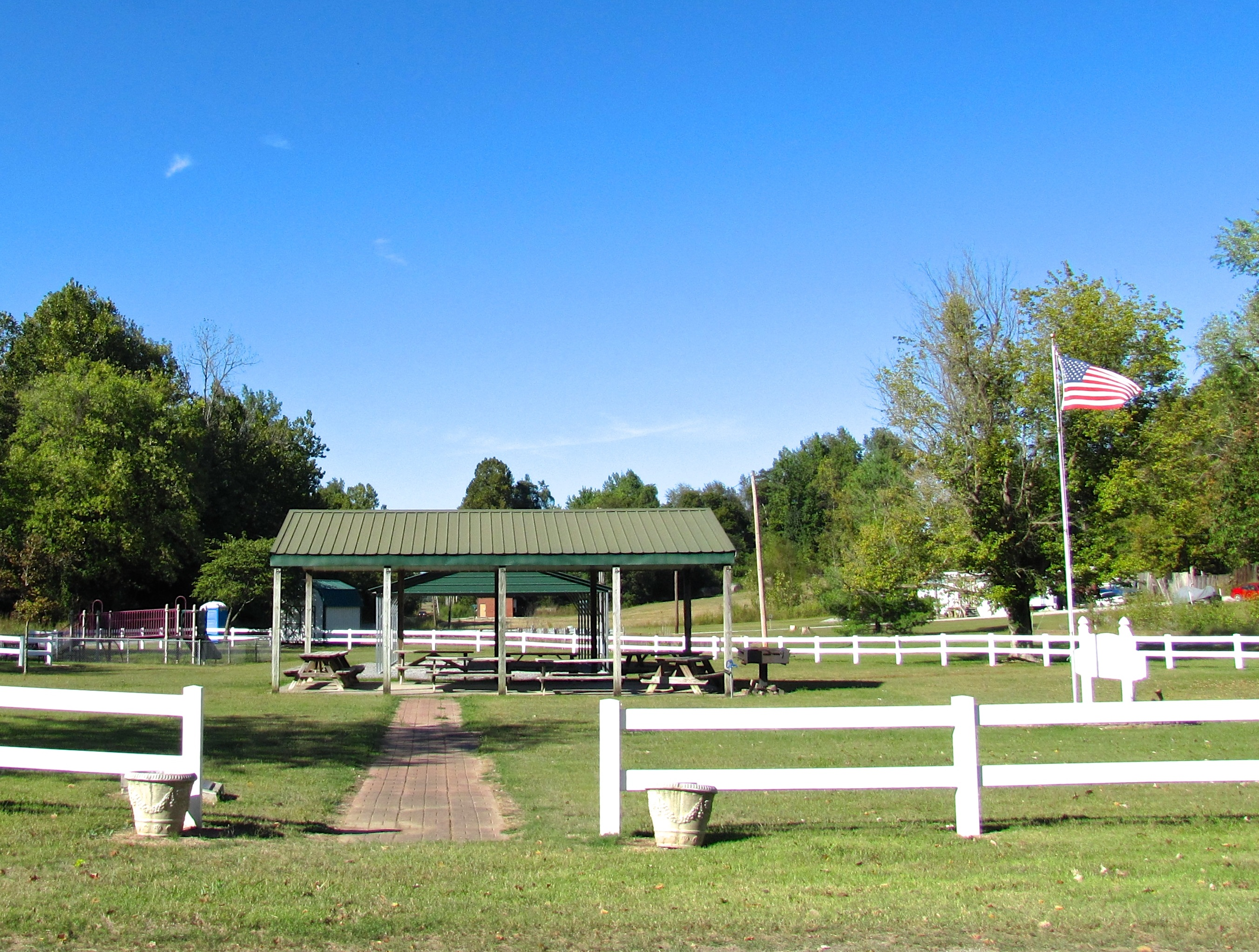
- Park in Village Ridge, September 2017

- Location within Illinois Location within the United States
- Coordinates: 37°09′31″N 89°11′41″W
- Country: United States
- State: Illinois
- County: Pulaski
- Elevation: 384 ft (117 m)
- Time zone: UTC-6 (Central (CST))
  - Summer (DST): UTC-5 (CDT)
- ZIP code: 62996
- Area code: 618
- GNIS feature ID: 420315

Villa Ridge is an unincorporated community in Pulaski County, Illinois, United States.

== Description ==
Villa Ridge has a post office with ZIP code 62996.

The town is located north of Mounds and was established in 1852 by the Illinois Central Railroad. An active rail line still runs through the town.

A post office was established in 1853 and named "Valley Forge"; it was changed to Villa Ridge in 1861. The present name is after a farm of the same name near the original town site.

== Notable persons ==
- Villa Ridge is the birthplace of John Morton Eshleman, who served as Lieutenant Governor of California during 1915 and 1916.
- Laura Jacinta Rittenhouse was buried at Cairo City Cemetery (1911).
