= Anthony Gorruso =

American jazz trumpeter (1957–2025)

Anthony Gorruso (born October 20, 1957, Buffalo, New York) (died June 6, 2025, Fort Lee, New Jersey was an American jazz trumpeter.

== Career ==
The son of Anthony Gorruso Sr., a high school band director, Gorruso began his professional career at age 17 in Buffalo with Spyro Gyra, which began in that city. His name is misspelled "Tony Garusso" on the album Spyro Gyra. From 1979 to 1983 he attended the Berklee College of Music, where he concentrated on arranging.

He has performed with Buddy Rich, Frank Sinatra, Sting, Tony Bennett, Clark Terry, Dean Martin, Sammy Davis Junior, The Duke Ellington Orchestra (under the direction of Mercer Ellington), Ray Charles, and Liza Minnelli. He recorded with Frank Sinatra on the LaserDisc Sinatra in Japan 1985, which aired on PBS in 1986, and the album Sinatra 80th Live in Concert. He appeared on the album Mother Nature's Son (1993) by Jon Lucien, Point of Departure by Mary Ellen Bernard, Music Is My Mistress by Mercer Ellington, Pearls by David Sanborn, and My Beautiful Dark Twisted Fantasy by Kanye West. Gorruso played lead trumpet for Buddy Rich from January through December 1984 and Frank Sinatra from January 1985 through July 1991. After six years of touring with Sinatra, he played trumpet for nearly ten years for the musical Miss Saigon on Broadway (1991–2001).
