= Demas Dean =

American jazz musician

Demas Dean (October 6, 1903, in Sag Harbor, New York – May 30, 1991) was an American jazz trumpeter.

== Career ==
At the age of ten, Dean started playing coronet and also played violin. In high school he performed with Mazzeo's Brass Band and Beatrice Van Houten. While a student at Howard University in the early 1920s, he worked with Doc Perry, Elmer Snowden, and Russell Wooding and went on tour with Lucille Hegamin. He played with Billy Butler, then became a member of jazz orchestras led by Ford Dabney and Leon Abbey. In 1928, he recorded with Bessie Smith. Beginning in 1929, he spent most of his career with bandleader Noble Sissle. After ten years, he left music and worked at the post office in Los Angeles.
