= Steamboat Willie (musician) =

American jazz musician (born 1951)

Steamboat Willie Larry Stoops
- Also known as: Steamboat Willie
- Born: Larry Stoops; 1951 (age 73–74); East St. Louis, Illinois
- Genres: Jazz, Dixieland, ragtime
- Occupations: Musician, bandleader
- Instruments: Cornet, trumpet
- Years active: 1972–present
- Labels: Jazzology;

Larry Stoops, better known as "Steamboat Willie" (born 1951), is a veteran musician of Dixieland, jazz, and ragtime music, specializing in the early twentieth century era of the genres. He and his band perform nightly at Musical Legends Park, in the French Quarter of New Orleans, at the Cafe Beignet.

== Early life ==
Born in East St. Louis, Illinois, the son of Resal and Edith [Rutledge] Stoops, Larry Stoops was playing cornet in a Pentecostal church band by the age of 8, and developed a style he refers to as, "playing fancy." [sic] While still a teenager, Stoops went to Tupelo, Mississippi, to study at the Pentecostal Bible Institute. He sold Kirby vacuum sweepers and worked at a local grocery for $1 an hour to put himself through school. His first job after graduation was selling Bibles. Married at 20, Stoops was posted as an assistant pastor in Maine, but “I just couldn’t make it. I couldn’t make enough money to feed myself or my wife. One day I got a six-pack of beer, called the pastor, and let them know I quit. (I didn’t even drink.)” Three of Stoops four siblings are members of the clergy.

== Career ==
Stoops' music career got started while he was working at a car-seat manufacturer in St. Louis. He was given a cornet, practiced with it, and eventually was asked to sit in with band playing at a local country club. Wearing his signature panama hat, Stoops has been a publicly performing musician since 1972, mostly in Louisiana, and especially in New Orleans. Stoops picked up his nickname “Steamboat Willie” during a gig in Biloxi, Mississippi. The Steamboat Willie Jazz Ensemble usually consists of a rotating and varying combination of clarinet, trombone, tuba, string, bass, piano and/or drum players; in addition to Stoops leading on trumpet or cornet. He sings most vocals.

In 1997, Stoops appeared with Larry Hagman in an episode of the television series, Orleans, on CBS.

After Hurricane Katrina devastated the city in 2005, Stoops went on a "relief tour" to several university and college towns around the country. In 2006, Stoops became a resident of New Orleans' Musicians' Village, a Habitat for Humanity project for musicians displaced by Katrina, and performed privately for Norway's Crown Prince Haakon when he toured the recovering area later that year.

== Discography ==
- Steamboat Willie Meets Dr. Jazz
- Live in New Zealand
- Living It Up in New Orleans
- Songs Of Praise
- Live in New Orleans (Volumes 1 & 2)
- New Orleans Kind of Love
- Steamboat Willie Meets Plink Floyd (Volumes 1 & 2)
- Gospel Jubilee
- The Legend of Jack Daniels (2008)
