= Raymond C. Fagan =

American jazz pianist, composer, and bandleader (1920s)

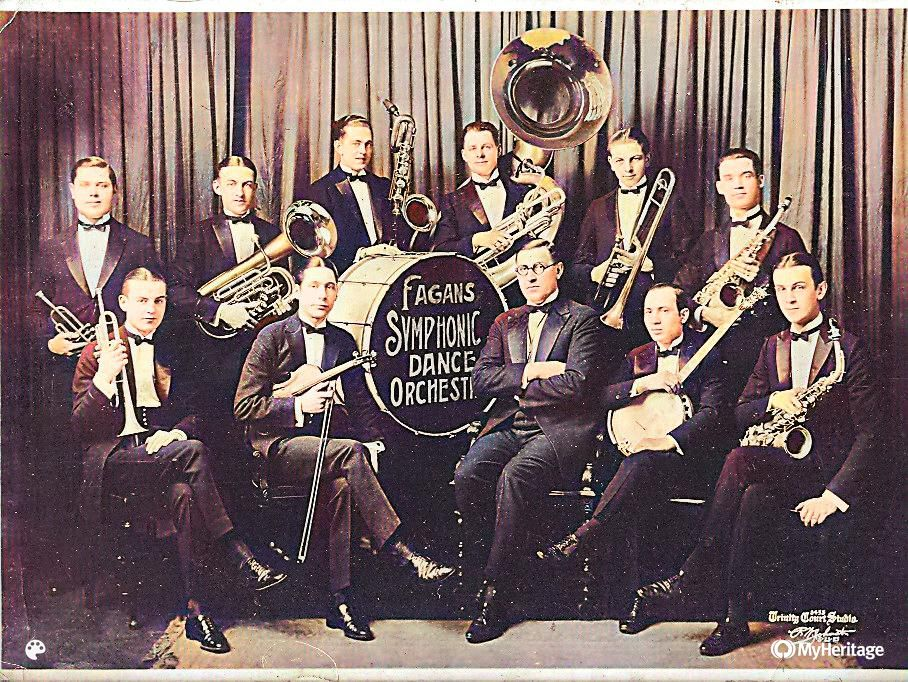
- Fagan (next to the drum, right) with his Symphonic Dance Orchestra, 1920s

Background information
- Origin: Rochester, New York, U.S.
- Genre: Early jazz
- Occupations: Musician; composer; bandleader
- Instrument: Piano
- Years active: 1899–1920s

Raymond C. Fagan was an American jazz pianist, composer, and bandleader during the early 20th century. An orchestra leader at the Temple Theater in Rochester, New York, he was discovered in 1921 by J. H. "Mickey" Finn, a Temple Theater Manager from Detroit, Michigan.

== Early career ==
Encouraged to recruit an orchestra to tour the vaudeville Temple Theater music circuit, Fagan had been at the Hotel Rochester with Bing (Byng) Bands as early as 1899. He acquired his passion for music as a teenager when he worked at the Edwards Music Store in Rochester and wrote short story scripts with songs at his church society gatherings as well as performed on local stages. His Bing Band arrangements became popular in the Rochester music scene during the early 1910s. He first introduced his version of "jazz-rag" at the Hotel Rochester on November 4, 1916. Popular Lake Ontario boat trips entertained jazz in August 1917.

Fagan had an Orchestra of 40 Syncopators in 1919. During the 1920s, records were made of his music and distributed across the country. He created a new jazz band called the "Worlds Fastest Melody Unit" and the "18 Aristocrats of Jazz". The band performed at the Shea Theater in Buffalo, New York, in 1923. It also inspired music discovery on the West Coast.

== Band ==
The Fagan Band performed the vaudeville Keith Orpheum Circuit touring avenue.
