= List of elections in 1863 =

The following elections occurred in the year 1863.

- 1863 Belgian general election
- 1863 Costa Rican general election
- 1863 Faroese general election
- 1863 French legislative election
- 1863 Liberian general election
- 1863 Luxembourg general election
- 1863 Orange Free State presidential election
- Prussian House of Representatives (28 October)
- 1863 Swiss federal election

== North America ==
=== United States ===
- 1863 New York state election

==== United States Senate ====
- 1862 and 1863 United States Senate elections
- United States Senate election in California, 1863
- United States Senate election in Massachusetts, 1863
- United States Senate election in New York, 1863
- United States Senate election in Pennsylvania, 1863
- United States Senate election in Wisconsin, 1863

==== United States House of Representatives ====
- 1862 and 1863 United States House of Representatives elections

==== United States lieutenant gubernatorial ====
- 1863 California lieutenant gubernatorial election
- 1863 Connecticut lieutenant gubernatorial election
- 1863 Minnesota lieutenant gubernatorial election
- 1863 Texas lieutenant gubernatorial election
- 1863 Wisconsin lieutenant gubernatorial election

==== United States gubernatorial ====
- 1863 California gubernatorial election
- 1863 Connecticut gubernatorial election
- 1863 Iowa gubernatorial election
- 1863 Kentucky gubernatorial election
- 1863 Maine gubernatorial election
- 1863 Massachusetts gubernatorial election
- 1863 Minnesota gubernatorial election
- 1863 New Hampshire gubernatorial election
- 1863 Ohio gubernatorial election
- 1863 Pennsylvania gubernatorial election
- 1863 Rhode Island gubernatorial election
- 1863 Vermont gubernatorial election
- 1863 West Virginia gubernatorial election
- 1863 Wisconsin gubernatorial election

==== United States mayoral elections ====
- 1863 Boston mayoral election
- 1863 Chicago mayoral election
- 1863 Manchester, New Hampshire election
- 1863 New York City mayoral election

== See also ==
- Category:1863 elections
