= List of elections in 1865 =

The following elections occurred in the year 1865.

== Africa ==
=== Liberia ===
- 1865 Liberian general election

== Europe ==
=== Denmark ===
- 1865 Danish Folketing election

=== Greece ===
- 1865 Greek legislative election

=== Hungary ===
- 1865 Hungarian parliamentary election

=== Italy ===
- 1865 Italian general election

=== Malta ===
- 1865 Maltese general election

=== Nassau ===
- 1865 general election in Duchy of Nassau

=== Norway ===
- 1865 Norwegian parliamentary election

=== Portugal ===
- 1865 Portuguese legislative election

=== United Kingdom ===
- 1865 United Kingdom general election
- 1865 United Kingdom general election in Ireland

== North America ==
=== Canada ===
- 1865 Newfoundland general election

=== United States ===
- 1865 New York state election

==== United States Senate ====
- 1864 and 1865 United States Senate elections
- 1865 United States Senate election in California
- 1865 United States Senate election in Massachusetts

==== United States House of Representatives ====
- 1864 and 1865 United States House of Representatives elections
- 1865 United States House of Representatives election in Florida

==== United States lieutenant gubernatorial ====
- 1865 Connecticut lieutenant gubernatorial election
- 1865 Minnesota lieutenant gubernatorial election
- 1865 Wisconsin lieutenant gubernatorial election

==== United States gubernatorial ====
- 1865 Alabama gubernatorial election
- 1865 Connecticut gubernatorial election
- 1865 Florida gubernatorial election
- 1865 Georgia gubernatorial election
- 1865 Iowa gubernatorial election
- 1865 Louisiana gubernatorial election
- 1865 Massachusetts gubernatorial election
- 1865 Maine gubernatorial election
- 1865 Minnesota gubernatorial election
- 1865 Mississippi gubernatorial election
- 1865 New Hampshire gubernatorial election
- 1865 New Jersey gubernatorial election
- 1865 North Carolina gubernatorial election
- 1865 Ohio gubernatorial election
- 1865 Rhode Island gubernatorial election
- 1865 South Carolina gubernatorial election
- 1865 Tennessee gubernatorial election
- 1865 Vermont gubernatorial election
- 1865 Wisconsin gubernatorial election

==== United States mayoral elections ====
- 1865 Boston mayoral election
- 1865 Chicago mayoral election
- 1865 Manchester, New Hampshire, mayoral election
- 1865 New York City mayoral election
- 1865 Philadelphia mayoral election
- 1865 Worcester, Massachusetts, mayoral election

== South America ==
=== Ecuador ===
- 1865 Ecuadorian presidential election

=== Peru ===
- 1865 Peruvian presidential referendum

== See also ==
- Category:1865 elections
