= 1864 United States elections =

- ← 1862 1863 1864 1865 1866 → Presidential election year
- Election day: November 8
- Incumbent president: ▌Abraham Lincoln (U)
- Next Congress: 39th

Presidential election
- Partisan control: National Union hold
- Popular vote margin: National Union +10.0%
- Electoral vote
- Abraham Lincoln (NU): 212
- George B. McClellan (D): 21
- 1864 presidential election results. Red denotes states won by Lincoln, blue denotes states won by McClellan, and brown denotes Confederate states that did not participate in the election. Numbers indicate the electoral votes won by each candidate.

Senate elections
- Overall control: National Union hold
- Seats contested: 14 of 50 seats
- Net seat change: National Union +2

House elections
- Overall control: National Union hold
- Seats contested: All 243 voting members
- Net seat change: National Union +40
- 1864–65 House of Representatives election results National Union gain National Union hold Democratic gain Democratic hold

Elections for the 39th United States Congress. The National Union president Abraham Lincoln was elected to a second term, while the Republican-Unionist coalition increased its majorities in the United States Congress. The elections were held during the American Civil War. Lincoln was assassinated shortly after his second inauguration and was succeeded by Andrew Johnson, who tried and failed to sustain the National Union Party.

In the presidential election, the National Union ticket of the incumbent president Abraham Lincoln and the military governor of Tennessee Andrew Johnson defeated the Democratic ticket of major general George B. McClellan and the U.S. representative from Ohio's 1st congressional district George H. Pendleton. Lincoln overcame factionalism in the Union Party and early concerns about the progress of the war to easily carry both the popular and electoral vote. His margin in the electoral college represented the greatest share of the electoral vote since James Monroe's uncontested re-election in 1820. Lincoln's victory made him the first president to win re-election since Andrew Jackson in 1832 and the first president not affiliated with the Democratic-Republican Party or the Democratic Party to win a second term.

Republican-Unionists gained seats in the House of Representatives, converting their plurality into a majority.

In the Senate, Republican-Unionists gained several seats, and continued to hold a majority.

== See also ==
- 1864 United States presidential election
- 1864–65 United States House of Representatives elections
- 1864–65 United States Senate elections
