= 1866 United States elections =

- ← 1864 1865 1866 1867 1868 → Midterm elections
- Incumbent president: ▌Andrew Johnson (U) (Note: Johnson was elected as vice president on the National Union ticket in 1864 and assumed the presidency in 1865 after the assassination of Abraham Lincoln. After becoming president, Johnson broke with Lincoln's Republican Party, attempted to form his own party, and was a candidate for the presidential nomination at the 1868 Democratic National Convention.)
- Next Congress: 40th

Senate elections
- Overall control: Republican hold
- Seats contested: 25 of 66 seats
- Net seat change: Republican +2
- Results of the elections: Democratic gain Democratic hold Republican gain Republican hold Legislature failed to elect Unreconstructed states

House elections
- Overall control: Republican hold
- Seats contested: All 224 voting seats
- Net seat change: Republican +23
- 1866 House of Representatives election results Democratic Republican Unreconstructed states

Elections occurred in the middle of National Union President Andrew Johnson's term, during the Third Party System and Reconstruction. Johnson had become president on April 15, 1865, upon the death of his predecessor, Abraham Lincoln. Members of the 40th United States Congress were chosen in this election. As this was the first election after the Civil War, many ex-Confederates were disfranchised, and several states of the Southern United States did not take part in the election. Delegations from Arkansas, Florida, Alabama, North Carolina, Louisiana, and South Carolina were re-admitted during the 40th Congress.

Johnson's supporters held the 1866 National Union Convention in hopes of rallying supporters against the Radical Republicans. However, the Republican Party maintained a dominant majority in both houses of Congress, and ultimately impeached Johnson in 1868.

In the House, Republicans won massive gains and increased their already-dominant majority, while Democrats suffered slight losses.

In the Senate, both parties picked up several seats, but Republicans retained a majority.

== See also ==
- 1866–67 United States House of Representatives elections
- 1866–67 United States Senate elections
