= 1862 United States elections =

- ← 1860 1861 1862 1863 1864 → Midterm elections
- Election day: January 6–November 4
- Incumbent president: ▌Abraham Lincoln (R)
- Next Congress: 38th

Senate elections
- Overall control: Republican-Union gain
- Seats contested: 6 of 68 seats (4 seats of Class I + 3 special elections)
- Net seat change: Republican-Union ±0
- Results; Union gain Constitutional Union gain Republican hold Border state Union hold Confederate state

House elections
- Overall control: Republican-Union hold
- Seats contested: 155 of 180 seats (151 general + 12 special elections)
- Net seat change: Democratic +29
- Results; Democratic gain Union gain Republican gain Democratic hold Union hold Republican hold Border state Union gain Border state Union hold Emancipation gain Conservative Union gain Independent gain

Gubernatorial elections
- Seats contested: 15 (13 Union, 2 Confederate)
- Results; Democratic gain Union gain Independent gain Border state Union gain Republican hold Constitutional Union hold

Elections were held in the United States on or before November 4, 1862, during the presidency of Abraham Lincoln. The Democratic Party flipped more than two dozen seats in the United States House of Representatives and won key state races in the Northern United States, but failed to end unified Republican-Union control of the White House and Congress.

Elections for the 38th United States Congress were staggered throughout 1862 and 1863, preceding the start of the first session. Four of the 24 United States senators in Class I and 151 of the 180 United States representatives were elected in 1862, with the remainder chosen the following year. Fifteen state gubernatorial elections, including two in the Confederacy, were also contested, alongside numerous state and local elections.

The elections took place against the backdrop of the American Civil War and the end of slavery in the United States. In what was the first real test of Democratic opposition to the Lincoln administration, Democrats made a net gain of 29 seats in the House, won governorships in New Jersey and New York, and flipped partisan control of state legislatures in four Lower North states. Republican-Unionists flipped a Democratic-held United States Senate seat in Oregon, while the Constitutional Union Party flipped a Republican-held seat in Rhode Island.

Emancipation and the status of freedpeople were major issues during the campaign. The appearance of the preliminary Emancipation Proclamation in late September interrupted the elections, with significant implications for party alignments. In the Upper North, the proclamation undercut Conservative efforts to marginalize Radical Republicans within the Republican-Union coalition. Democrats benefited from racist backlash to the proclamation in the Lower North, wielding anti-abolitionist rhetoric to great effect. Opposition to conscription, Lincoln's suspension of habeas corpus, and a sagging war effort also contributed to the strong Democratic showing in the region.

While contemporary observers interpreted the elections as a "severe reproof" of the administration, the results of the elections were inconclusive. Despite the magnitude of the Democratic gains in 1862, Republican-Unionists were able to salvage their congressional majorities due to the support of Unionists from the border states. The lack of absentee voting for soldiers contributed to the decline in the Republican-Union vote compared to 1860.

== See also ==
- 1862–63 United States House of Representatives elections
- 1862–63 United States Senate elections

== Bibliography ==
- Allardice, Bruce S. (Spring–Summer 2011). "'Illinois is Rotten with Traitors!' The Republican Defeat in the 1862 State Election". Journal of the Illinois State Historical Society. 104 (1/2): 97–114. JSTOR 41201305.
- Carey, Charles Henry (1922). History of Oregon. Chicago: Pioneer Historical Publishing Company.
- Current, Richard N. (1976). The History of Wisconsin. Vol. 2: The Civil War Era, 1848–1873. Madison: State Historical Society of Wisconsin.
- Dell, Christopher (1975). Lincoln and the War Democrats: The Grand Erosion of Conservative Tradition. Rutherford, NJ: Farleigh Dickenson University Press.
- Donald, David (1970). Charles Sumner and the Rights of Man. New York: Alfred A. Knopf.
- Dubin, Michael J. (2007). Party Affiliations in State Legislatures: A Year by Year Summary, 1796–2006. Jefferson, NC: McFarland and Company.
- Dubin, Michael J. (March 1, 1998). United States Congressional Elections, 1788–1997: The Official Results of the Elections of the 1st through 105th Congresses. Jefferson, N.C.: McFarland and Company. ISBN 978-0-7864-0283-0.
- McPherson, James M. (1988). Battle Cry of Freedom: The Civil War Era. New York: Oxford University.
- Silbey, Joel H. (1977). A Respectable Minority: The Democratic Party in the Civil War Era, 1860–1868. New York: W. W. Norton and Company. ISBN 978-0-393-05648-8.
- Smith, Adam I. P. (2006). No Party Now: Politics in the Civil War North. New York: Oxford University Press. ISBN 978-0-19-518865-3.
- Thornbrough, Emma Lou (1995). Indiana in the Civil War Era, 1850–1880. Indianapolis: Indiana Historical Society.
