= 1865 Connecticut lieutenant gubernatorial election =

- April 3, 1865
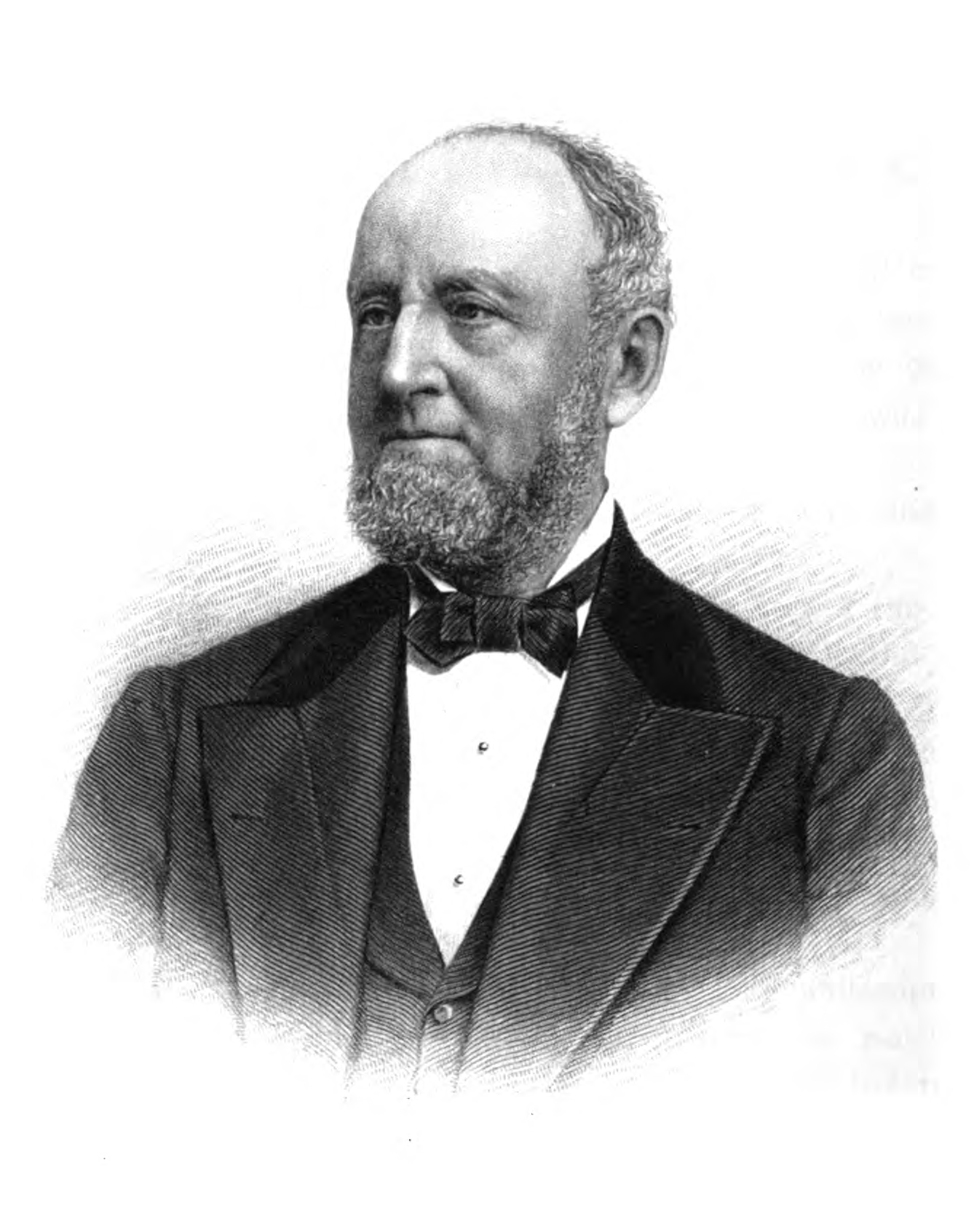

Nominee	Roger Averill	Thomas H. Bond
Party	National Union	Democratic
Popular vote	42,417	31,351
Percentage	57.50%	42.50%
Lieutenant Governor before election
Roger Averill
National Union
Elected Lieutenant Governor
Roger Averill
National Union

The 1865 Connecticut lieutenant gubernatorial election was held on April 3, 1865, to elect the lieutenant governor of Connecticut. Incumbent National Union lieutenant governor Roger Averill won re-election against Democratic nominee Thomas H. Bond in a rematch of the previous election.

== General election ==
On election day, April 3, 1865, incumbent National Union lieutenant governor Roger Averill won re-election with 57.50% of the vote, thereby retaining National Union control over the office of lieutenant governor. Averill was sworn in for his fourth term on May 3, 1865.

=== Results ===
Connecticut lieutenant gubernatorial election, 1865
Party	Candidate	Votes	%
National Union	Roger Averill (incumbent)	42,417	57.50
Democratic	Thomas H. Bond	31,351	42.50
	Scattering	4	0.00
Total votes		73,770	100.00
National Union hold			
