= Jacob D. Cox House =

Historic house in Ohio, United States

- U.S. National Register of Historic Places
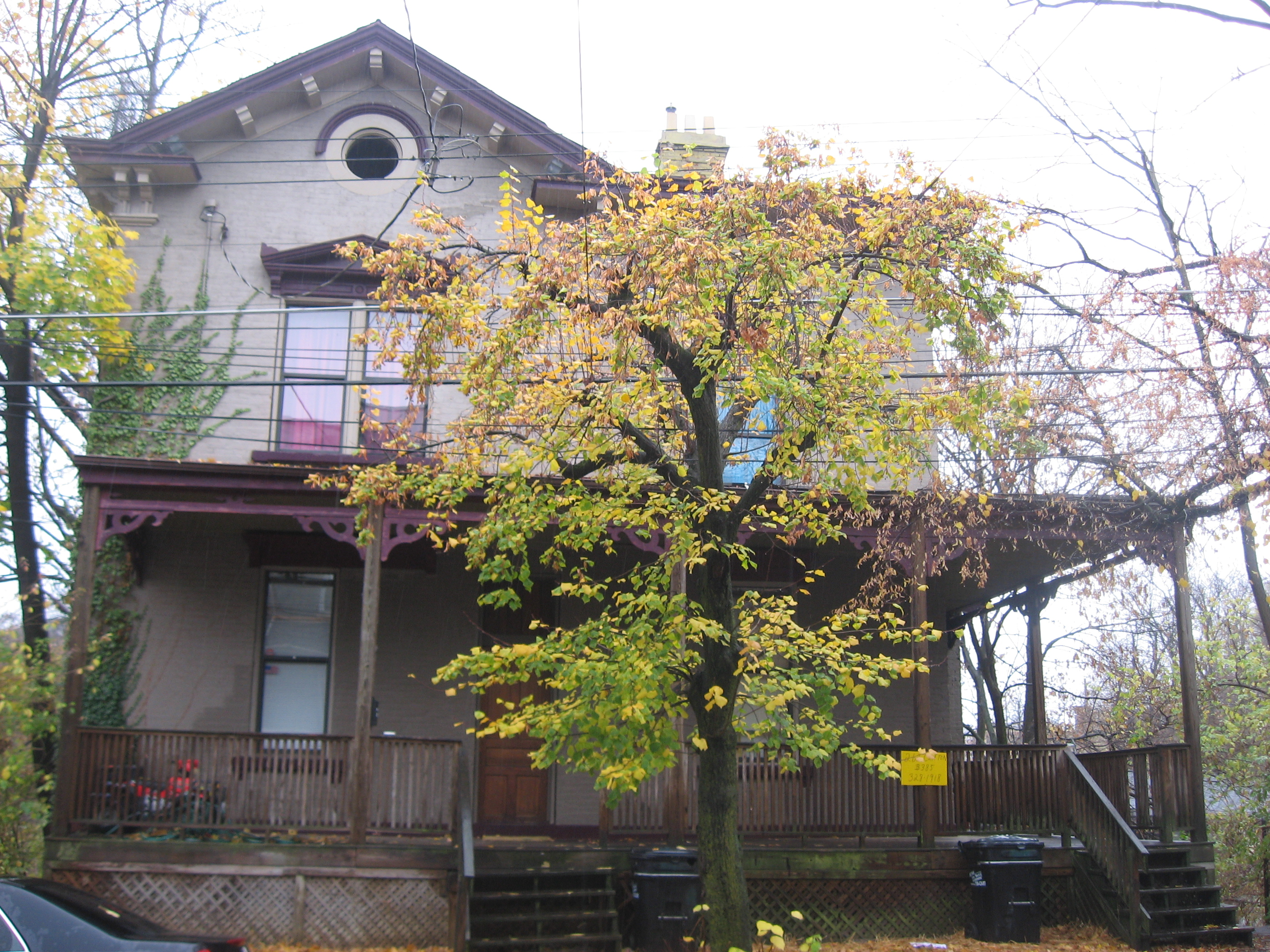
- Front of the house

- Location within Ohio Location within the United States
- Interactive map showing the location of Jacob D. Cox House
- Location: 241-243 Gilman Ave., Cincinnati, Ohio
- Coordinates: 39°7′19″N 84°30′19″W
- Area: less than one acre
- Built: 1880
- Architectural style: Italianate
- NRHP reference No.: 75001416
- Added to NRHP: April 14, 1975

The Jacob D. Cox House is a historic residence located on Gilman Avenue in the Mount Auburn neighborhood of Cincinnati, Ohio, United States. An Italianate structure built in 1880, it was the home of prominent politician Jacob Dolson Cox. A native of Montréal in Lower Canada, Cox settled in Ohio in the 1840s, served in the Ohio Senate from 1859 to 1861, and later served as the United States Secretary of the Interior during the Grant administration. A resident of Gilman Avenue from 1883 to 1897, Cox held office as the president of the Toledo, Wabash and Western Railway and as the dean of the University of Cincinnati's law school. His two-year service as president of the University of Cincinnati occurred during his residence at the house, which concluded upon his retirement to Oberlin, Ohio.

Cox's house is similar to many others constructed in Mount Auburn during the third quarter of the nineteenth century, at which time it was a suburban neighborhood. A two-story brick building, it features a rear gable and a hip roof over the main part of the house, plus various details of stone. Because of its historically distinctive architecture, and because of its connection to Cox, the house was listed on the National Register of Historic Places in 1975. It is currently a private residence.
