= 1865 Ohio gubernatorial election =

- October 10, 1865
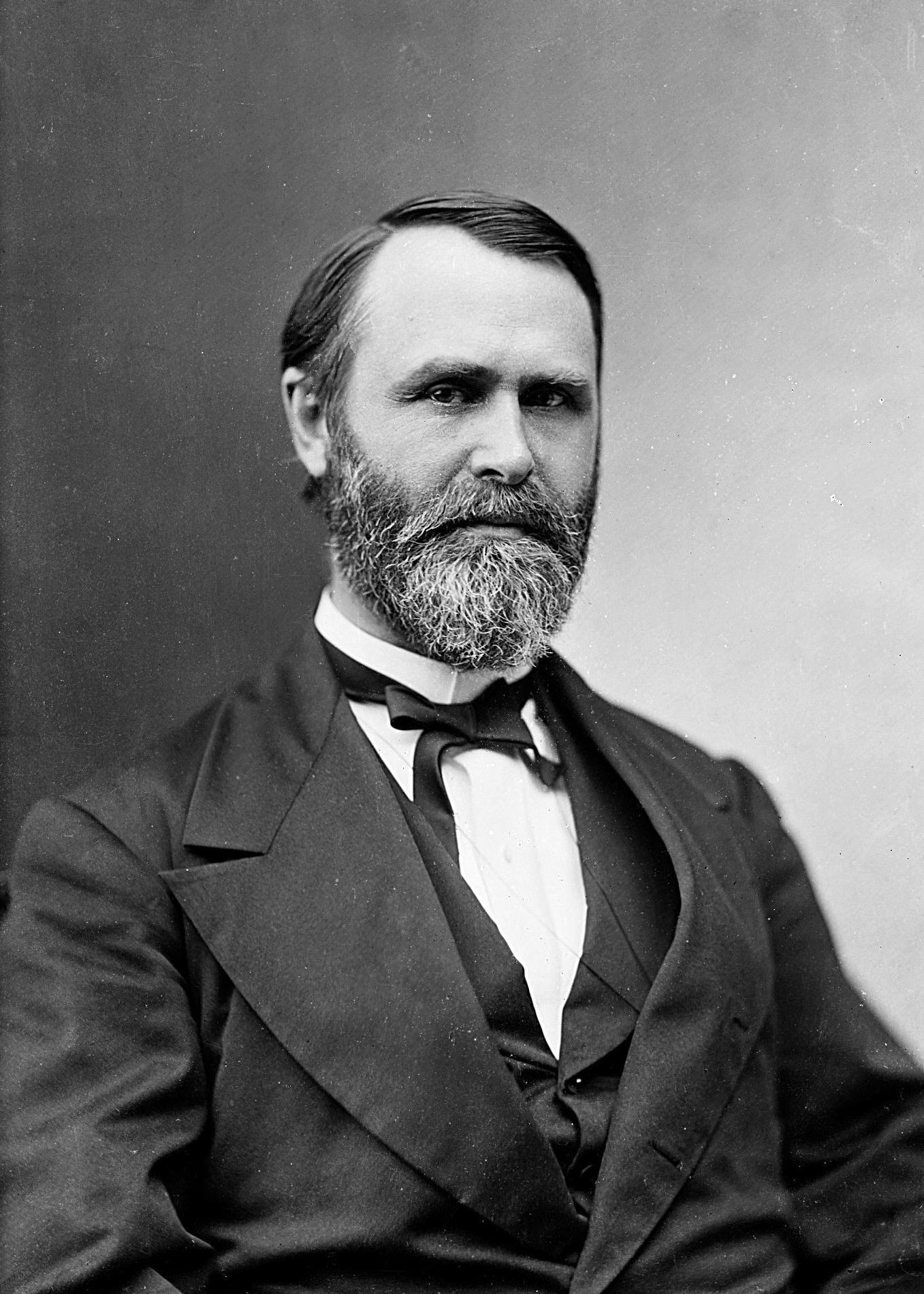

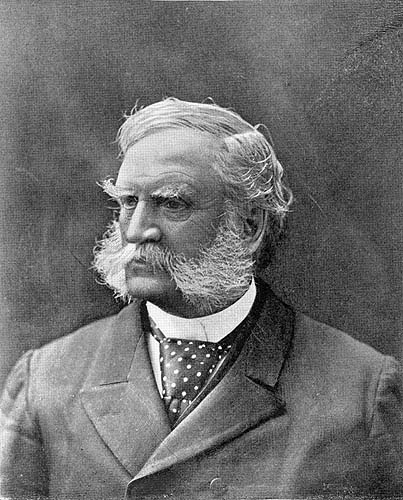
Nominee	Jacob Dolson Cox	George W. Morgan
Party	National Union	Democratic
Popular vote	223,633	193,797
Percentage	53.53%	46.39%
- County results Cox: 50–60% 60–70% 70–80% 80–90% Morgan: 50–60% 60–70% 70–80%
Governor before election
Charles Anderson
National Union
Elected Governor
Jacob Dolson Cox
National Union

The 1865 Ohio gubernatorial election was held on October 10, 1865. National Union nominee Jacob Dolson Cox defeated Democratic nominee George W. Morgan with 53.53% of the vote.

== General election ==
=== Candidates ===
- Jacob Dolson Cox, National Union
- George W. Morgan, Democratic

=== Results ===
1865 Ohio gubernatorial election
Party	Candidate	Votes	%	±%
National Union	Jacob Dolson Cox	223,633	53.53%	
Democratic	George W. Morgan	193,797	46.39%	
Majority		29,836		
Turnout				
National Union hold		Swing		
