= 1864 Connecticut lieutenant gubernatorial election =

- April 4, 1864
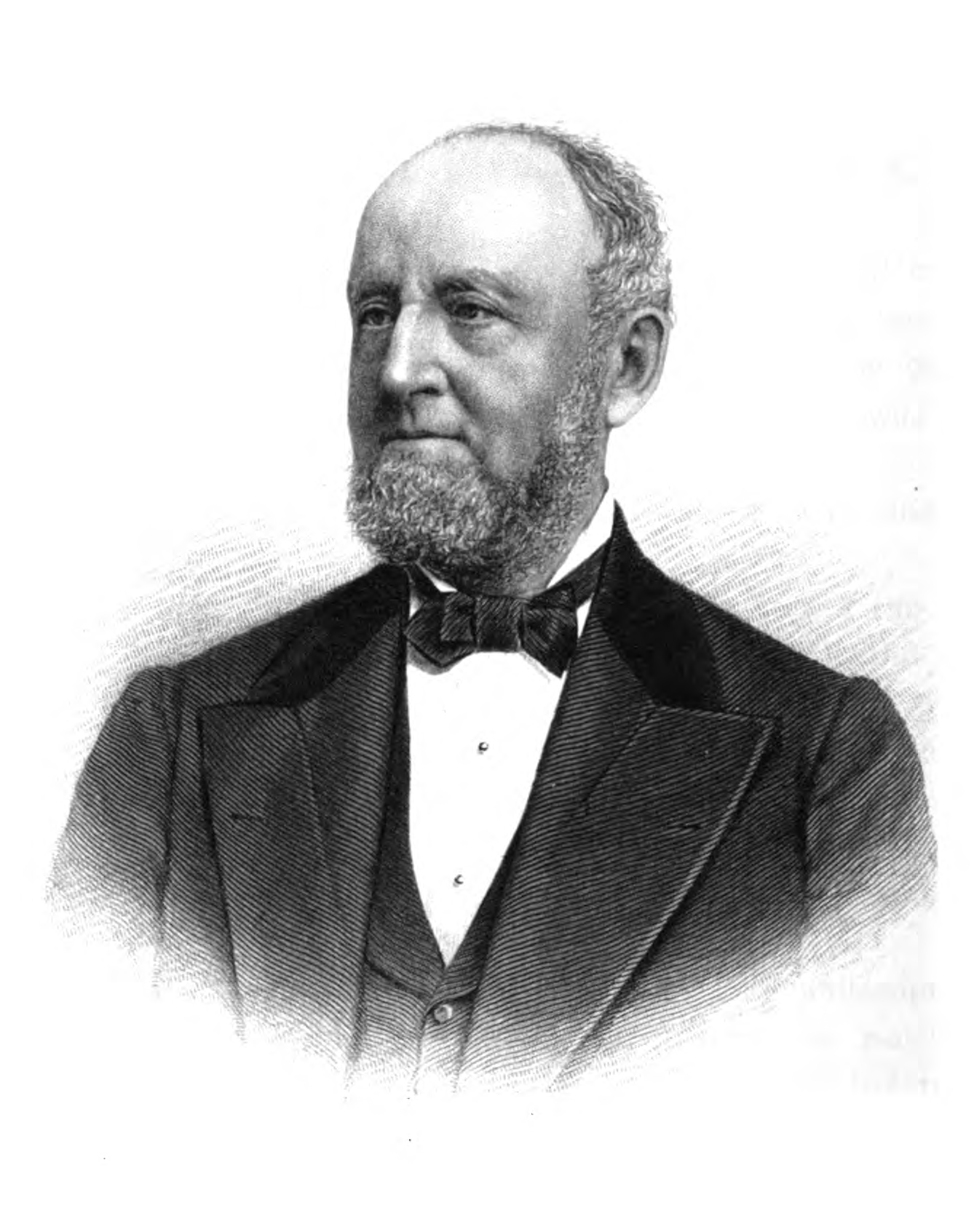

Nominee	Roger Averill	Thomas H. Bond
Party	National Union	Democratic
Popular vote	39,940	33,949
Percentage	54.10%	45.90%
Lieutenant Governor before election
Roger Averill
National Union
Elected Lieutenant Governor
Roger Averill
National Union

The 1864 Connecticut lieutenant gubernatorial election was held on April 4, 1864, to elect the lieutenant governor of Connecticut. Incumbent National Union lieutenant governor Roger Averill won re-election against Democratic nominee Thomas H. Bond.

== General election ==
On election day, April 4, 1864, incumbent National Union lieutenant governor Roger Averill won re-election with 54.10% of the vote, thereby retaining National Union control over the office of lieutenant governor. Averill was sworn in for his third term on May 4, 1864.

=== Results ===
Connecticut lieutenant gubernatorial election, 1864
Party	Candidate	Votes	%
National Union	Roger Averill (incumbent)	39,940	54.10
Democratic	Thomas H. Bond	33,949	45.90
	Scattering	3	0.00
Total votes		73,893	100.00
National Union hold			
