= 1863 Connecticut lieutenant gubernatorial election =

- April 6, 1863
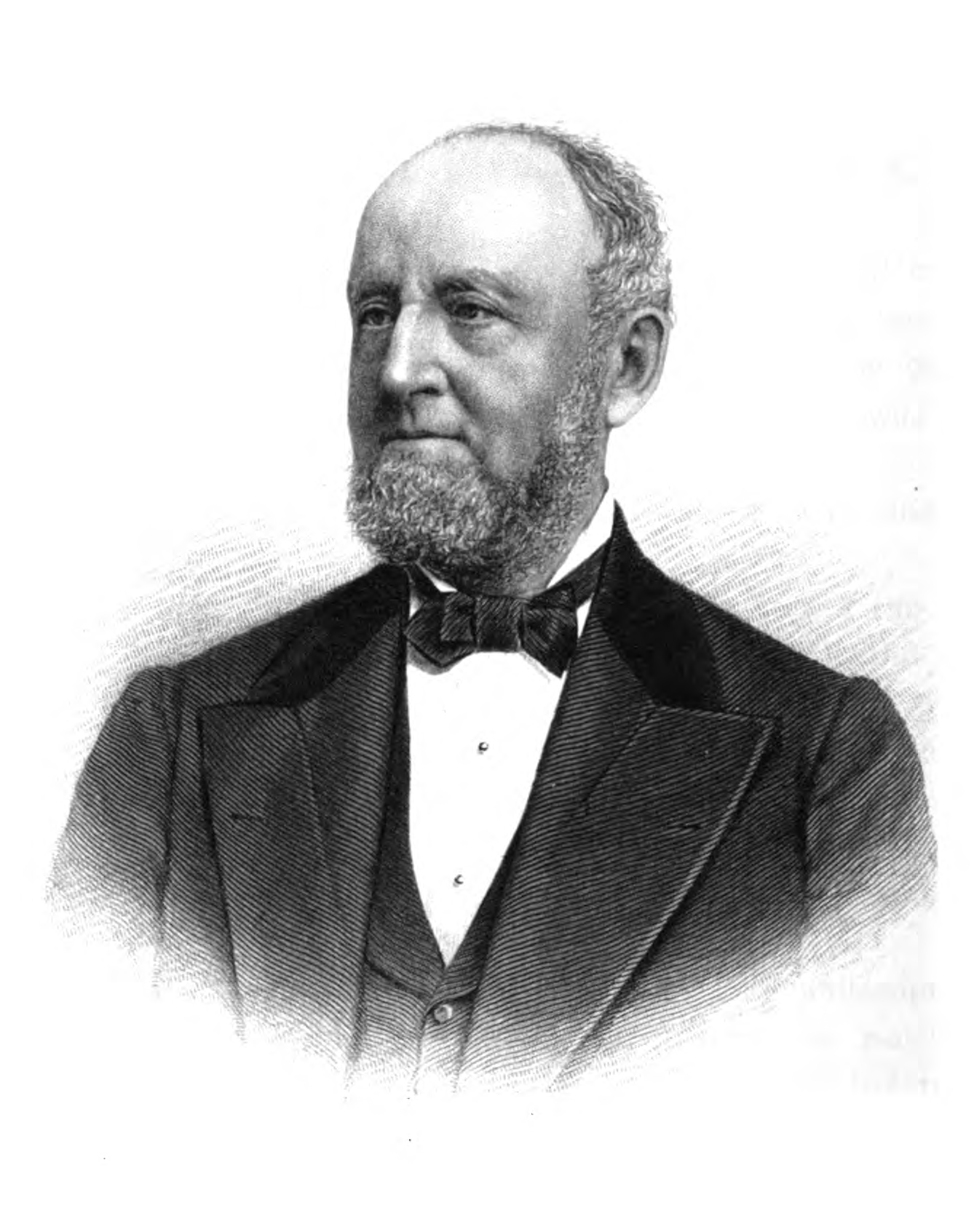

Nominee	Roger Averill	James A. Hovey
Party	National Union	Democratic
Popular vote	41,199	38,204
Percentage	51.60%	47.80%
Lieutenant Governor before election
Roger Averill
National Union
Elected Lieutenant Governor
Roger Averill
National Union

The 1863 Connecticut lieutenant gubernatorial election was held on April 6, 1863, to elect the lieutenant governor of Connecticut. Incumbent National Union lieutenant governor Roger Averill won re-election against Democratic nominee James A. Hovey.

== General election ==
On election day, April 6, 1863, incumbent National Union lieutenant governor Roger Averill won re-election with 51.60% of the vote, thereby retaining National Union control over the office of lieutenant governor. Averill was sworn in for his second term on May 6, 1863.

=== Results ===
Connecticut lieutenant gubernatorial election, 1863
Party	Candidate	Votes	%
National Union	Roger Averill (incumbent)	41,199	51.60
Democratic	James A. Hovey	38,204	47.80
	Scattering	502	0.60
Total votes		79,905	100.00
National Union hold			
