= 1865 Georgia gubernatorial election =

- 15 November 1865
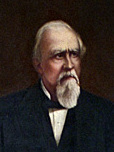
Nominee	Charles J. Jenkins
Party	Democratic
Popular vote	37,200
Percentage	98.20%
- Results by County; Jenkins : 50–60% 70–80% 80–90% >90% No Data
Governor before election
James Johnson
Elected Governor
Charles J. Jenkins
Democratic

The 1865 Georgia gubernatorial election was held on November 15, 1865, in order to elect the Governor of Georgia. It was the first gubernatorial election in Georgia following the American Civil War and saw Democratic nominee Charles J. Jenkins win effectively unopposed as no other candidate had been nominated.

== General election ==
The Savannah daily herald noted that it was the most orderly and quiet election it had ever witnessed.

=== Results ===
As given by the Macon Telegraph

Georgia gubernatorial election, 1868
Party	Candidate	Votes	%
Democratic	Charles J. Jenkins	37,200	98.20
Write-in	Joseph E. Brown	500	1.32
Write-in	Alexander H. Stephens	83	0.22
Write-in	B. L. Benning	32	0.08
Write-in	Herschel V. Johnson	24	0.06
Write-in	John B. Gordon	4	0.01
Write-in	Alfred H. Colquitt	3	0.01
Write-in	Bill Arp	3	0.01
Write-in	James Gardner	2	0.01
Write-in	George W. Crawford	2	0.01
Write-in	Scattering	29	0.08
Total votes		37,882	100.00
