= 1863 Orange Free State presidential election =

| ← 1860 | 5 November 1863 | 1868 → |
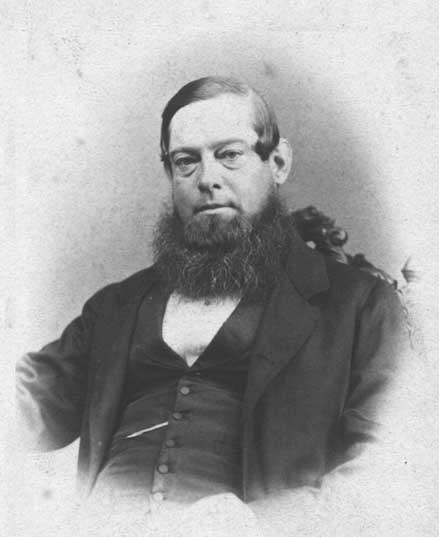
| Nominee | Johannes Brand |
President before election
Marthinus Wessel Pretorius
Elected President
Johannes Brand

Presidential elections were held in the Orange Free State on 5 November 1863. The result was a victory for Johannes Brand, who was inaugurated as the fourth President of the country on 2 February 1864.
