= 1865 Wisconsin lieutenant gubernatorial election =

- November 7, 1865
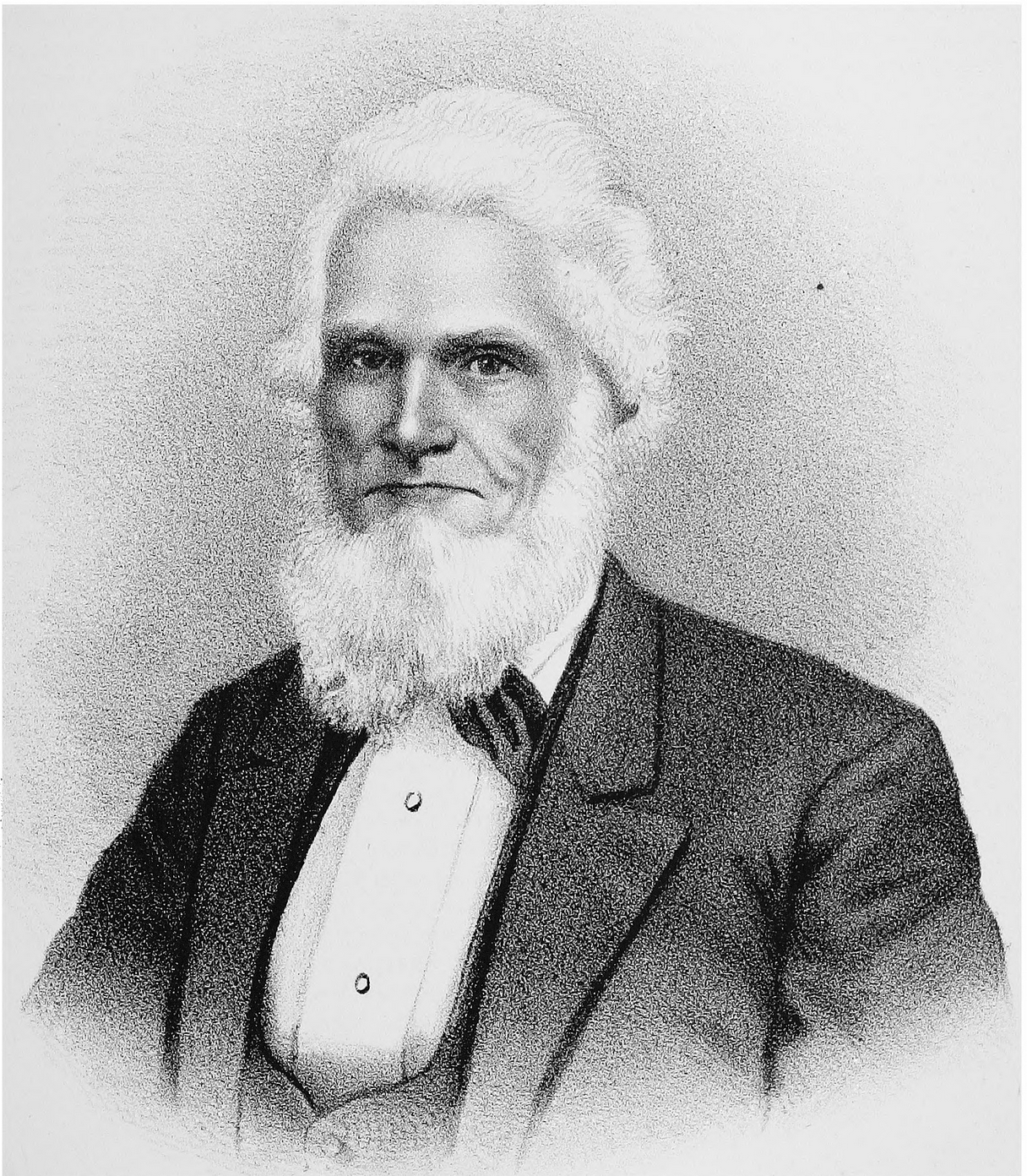

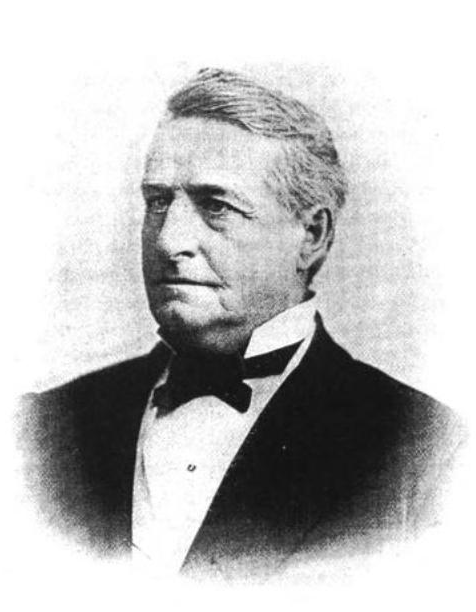
Nominee	Wyman Spooner	Densmore Maxon
Party	Republican	Democratic
Popular vote	58,356	48,185
Percentage	54.77%	45.22%
Lieutenant Governor before election
Wyman Spooner
Republican
Elected Lieutenant Governor
Wyman Spooner
Republican

The 1865 Wisconsin lieutenant gubernatorial election was held on November 7, 1865, in order to elect the lieutenant governor of Wisconsin. Incumbent Republican lieutenant governor Wyman Spooner defeated Democratic nominee and former member of the Wisconsin Senate Densmore Maxon. This election marked the first time in the state's history a sitting lieutenant governor was re-elected.

== General election ==
On election day, November 7, 1865, incumbent Republican lieutenant governor Wyman Spooner won re-election by a margin of 10,171 votes against his opponent Democratic nominee Densmore Maxon, thereby retaining Republican control over the office of lieutenant governor. Spooner was sworn in for his second term on January 1, 1866.

=== Results ===
Wisconsin lieutenant gubernatorial election, 1865
Party	Candidate	Votes	%
Republican	Wyman Spooner (incumbent)	58,356	54.77
Democratic	Densmore Maxon	48,185	45.22
	Scattering	11	0.01
Total votes		106,552	100.00
Republican hold			
