= 1863 Faroese general election =

Danish territorial election

Partial general elections were held in the Faroe Islands in 1863 to elect nine of the eighteen elected members of the Løgting. The Danish administrator (Amtmaður) and the local dean (Próstur) were also members, with the administrator serving as the speaker.

== Electoral system ==
Members of the Løgting were elected by first-past-the-post voting, with voters having as many votes as there were seats available in their constituency. Nine of the 18 seats were elected every two years. Voting was restricted to men aged 25 or over who met certain tax-paying criteria.

== Results ==
Constituency	Elected members	Notes
Eysturoy	Jógvan Joensen	
Eysturoy	Gregorius Johannesen	
Eysturoy	Johannes Petersen	
Eysturoy	Peter Christian Weihe	Re-elected
Norðurstreymoy	Joen Olsen	
Norðurstreymoy	Johan Olsen	
Suðurstreymoy	Enok Bærentsen	Previously elected in Norðurstreymoy
Vágar	Hans Christoffer Joensen	
Vágar	Zacharias Nielsen	
Source: Løgting

=== By constituency ===
Norðurstreymoy
Candidate	Votes	%
Johan Olsen	14	43.75
Joen Olsen	7	21.88
Joen David Olsen	7	21.88
Hans Christopher Müller	2	6.25
Hans Jacob Jacobsen	1	3.12
Ole Jacob Mikkelsen	1	3.12
Total	32	100.00
Total votes	9	–
Registered voters/turnout	138	6.52
Source: Løgting
