= 1865 North Carolina gubernatorial election =

- November 9, 1865
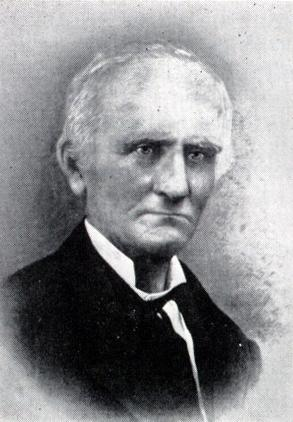

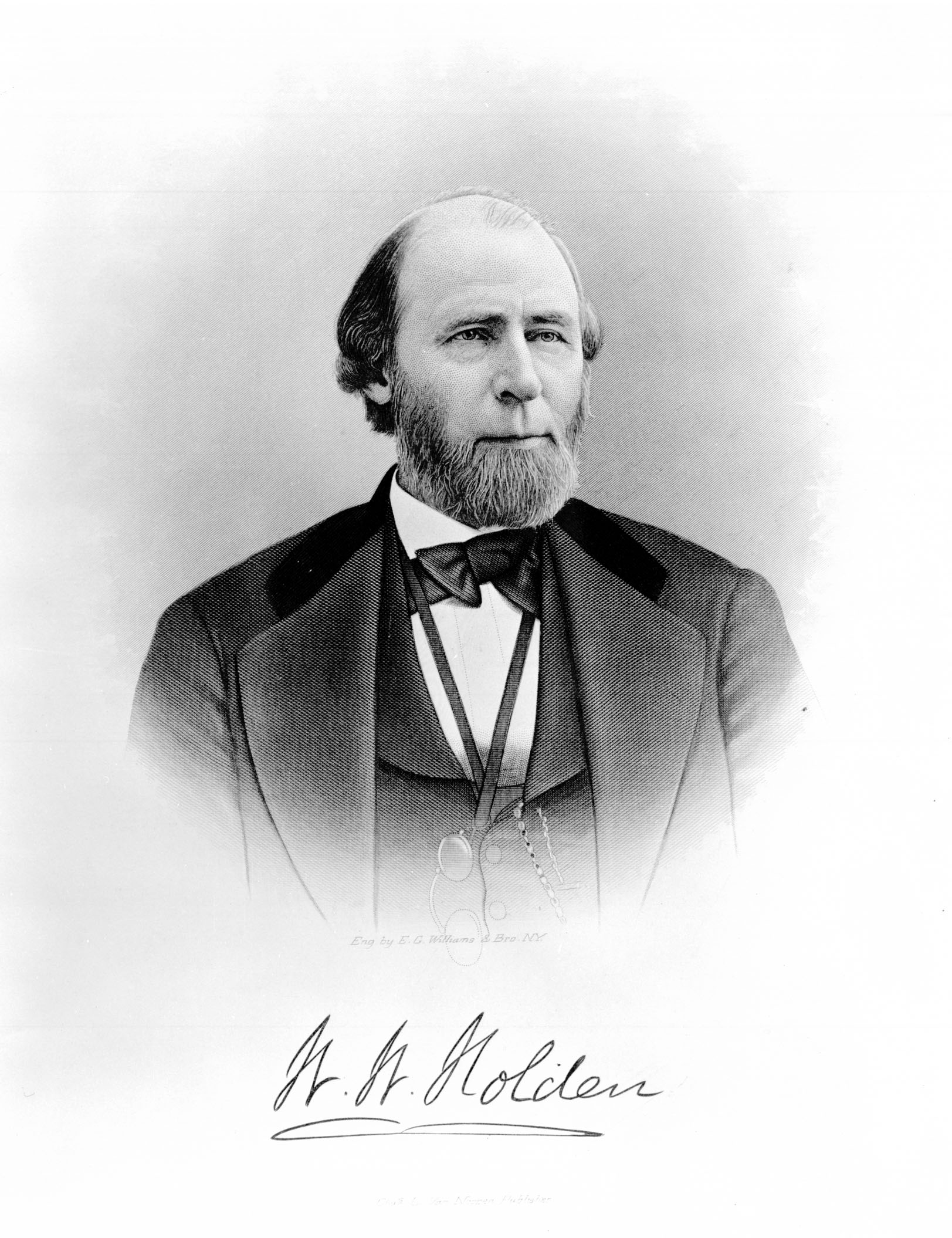
Nominee	Jonathan Worth	William Woods Holden
Party	Nonpartisan	Nonpartisan
Popular vote	32,549	25,809
Percentage	55.49%	44.00%
- County results Worth: 50–60% 60–70% 70–80% 80–90% >90% Holden: 50–60% 60–70% 70–80% 80–90% >90% No Data
Governor before election
William Woods Holden (as Provisional Governor)
Nonpartisan
Elected Governor
Jonathan Worth
Nonpartisan

The 1865 North Carolina gubernatorial election was held on November 9, 1865, in order to elect the Governor of North Carolina. This was the first election held in North Carolina following the end of the American Civil War. The former North Carolina State Treasurer Jonathan Worth defeated the incumbent provisional governor William Woods Holden. Both candidates ran as Unionists.

== Results ==
North Carolina gubernatorial election, 1865
Party	Candidate	Votes	%
Nonpartisan	Jonathan Worth	32,539	55.77
Nonpartisan	William Woods Holden (incumbent)	25,809	44.23
	Scattering	296	0.51
Total votes		58,654	100.00
Nonpartisan hold			
