= 1863 California lieutenant gubernatorial election =

- September 2, 1863

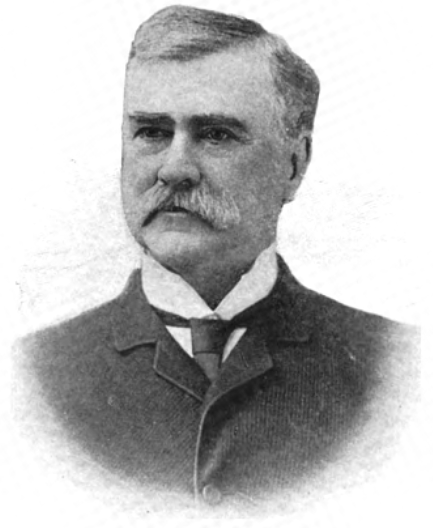
Nominee	Tim N. Machin	Elisha W. McKinstry
Party	National Union	Democratic
Popular vote	64,873	43,923
Percentage	59.63%	40.37%
County results
Machin
50–60%
60–70%
70–80%
80–90%
McKinstry
50–60%
70–80%
80–90%
No Data
Lieutenant Governor before election
John F. Chellis
Republican
Elected Lieutenant Governor
Tim N. Machin
National Union

The 1863 California lieutenant gubernatorial election was held on September 2, 1863, in order to elect the lieutenant governor of California. National Union nominee and former Speaker of the California State Assembly Tim N. Machin defeated Democratic nominee and former member of the California State Assembly Elisha W. McKinstry.

== General election ==
On election day, September 2, 1863, National Union nominee Tim N. Machin won the election by a margin of 20,950 votes against his opponent Democratic nominee Elisha W. McKinstry, thereby gaining National Union control over the office of lieutenant governor. Machin was sworn in as the 10th lieutenant governor of California on December 10, 1863.

=== Results ===
California lieutenant gubernatorial election, 1863
Party	Candidate	Votes	%
National Union	Tim N. Machin	64,873	59.63
Democratic	Elisha W. McKinstry	43,923	40.37
Total votes		108,796	100.00
National Union gain from Republican			
