= 1863 Texas lieutenant gubernatorial election =

- August 3, 1863
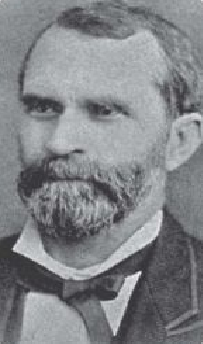

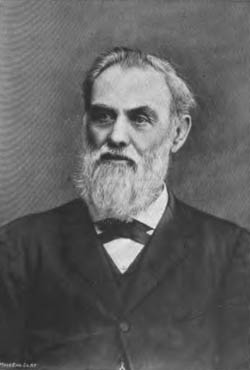

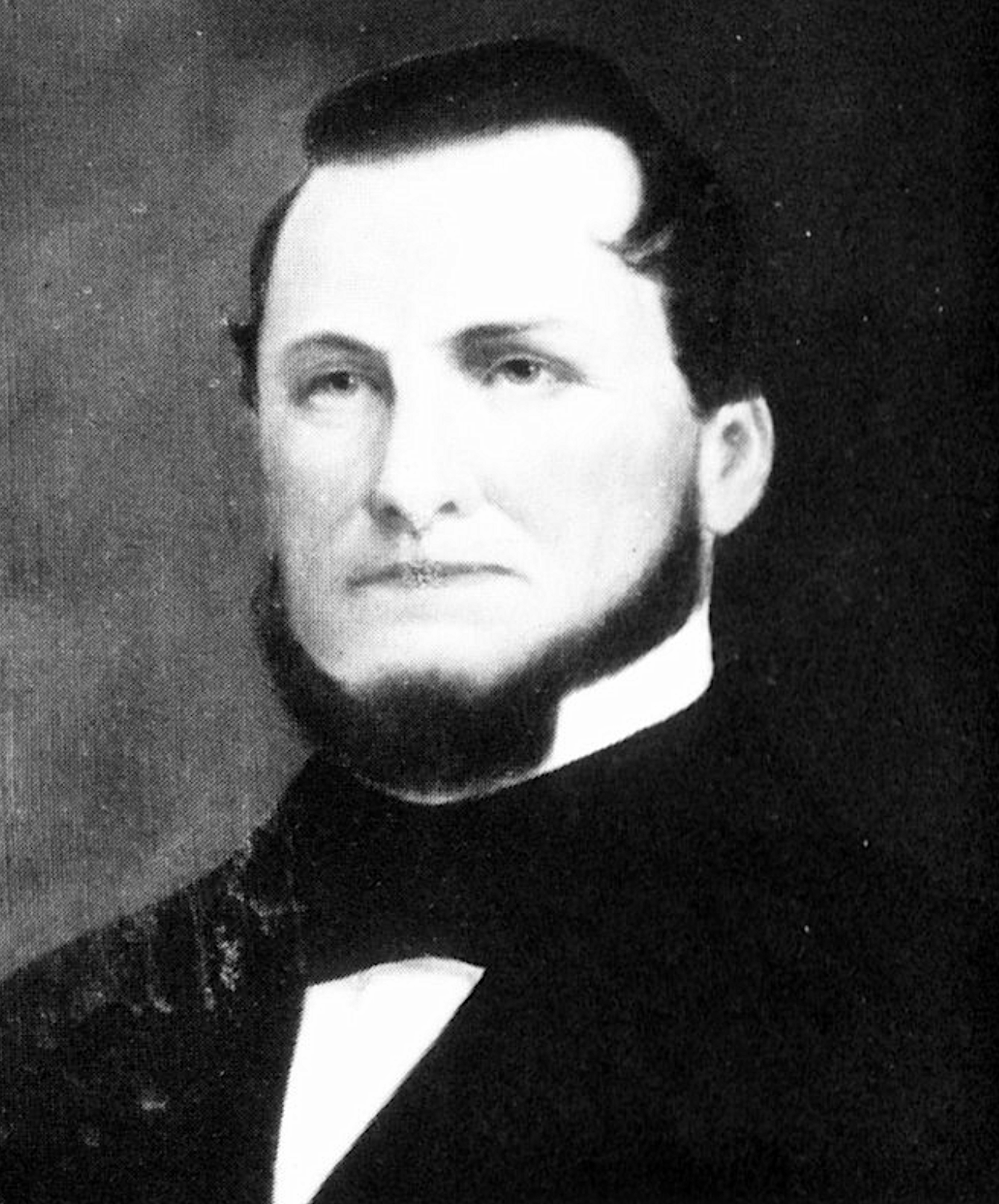
| Nominee | Fletcher Stockdale | Stephen Heard Darden |
| Party | Independent | Independent |
| Popular vote | 11,928 | 8,214 |
| Percentage | 41.2% | 28.3% |
| Nominee | Frederick B. Gentry | Pleasant Williams Kittrell |
| Party | Independent | Independent |
| Popular vote | 4,625 | 4,216 |
| Percentage | 16.0% | 14.5% |
Lieutenant Governor before election
John McClannahan Crockett
Independent
Elected Lieutenant Governor
Fletcher Stockdale
Independent

The 1863 Texas lieutenant gubernatorial election was held on August 3, 1863, to elect the lieutenant governor of Texas. In a competitive four–way race former state senator Fletcher Stockdale won the election with over 41% to become the ninth lieutenant governor of the state.

== Background ==
The election took place during the American Civil War after Texas had joined the Confederate States, as such the main issues of the election were the conduct of the war and the candidate's staces towards the Jefferson Davis administration. The incumbent lieutenant governor, John McClannahan Crockett did not run for reelection.

== General election ==
=== Candidates ===
- Stephen Heard Darden, colonel of the 5th Texas Infantry, former state senator and representative
- Frederick Browder Gentry
- Pleasant Williams Kittrell, doctor, former state representative, former member of the Alabama Legislature, former member of the North Carolina House of Representatives
- Fletcher Summerfield Stockdale, lawyer, special aide to Governor Francis R. Lubbock, former state senator, delegate at the 1861 Secession Convention

=== Results ===
Texas lieutenant gubernatorial election, 1863
| Party | Candidate | Votes | % |
|---|---|---|---|
| Independent | Fletcher Stockdale | 11,928 | 41.16 |
| Independent | Stephen Heard Darden | 8,214 | 28.34 |
| Independent | Frederick B. Gentry | 8,214 | 28.34 |
| Independent | Pleasant Williams Kittrell | 4,216 | 14.55 |
| Total votes | | 54,612 | 100.00 |
| Independent hold | | | |

== Aftermath ==
With the surrender of Robert E. Lee's forces at Appomatox Courthouse, Governor Pendleton Murrah advocated a continuation of the war effort. However, when it became clear that the Union army was going to occupy the state he fled to Mexico, vacating the office. Fletcher Stockdale served as acting governor until Andrew Jackson Hamilton was appointed provisional governor of Texas to oversee the first stages of Reconstruction and the ratification of the XIII Amendment.
