= 1865 Peruvian presidential referendum =

A referendum on Mariano Ignacio Prado becoming provisional President was held in Peru on 28 November 1865. Prado had come to power in April 1865 after launching a military coup against President Juan Antonio Pezet.

After his position was approved in the referendum, on 28 July 1866 he called elections for a Constitutional Council. The Council met for the first time on 15 February 1867, and a new constitution came into force on 19 August. However, Prado left the country on 8 January 1868 after riots, and the following day Congress annulled the new constitution.
