= 1865 Ecuadorian presidential election =

- 1865
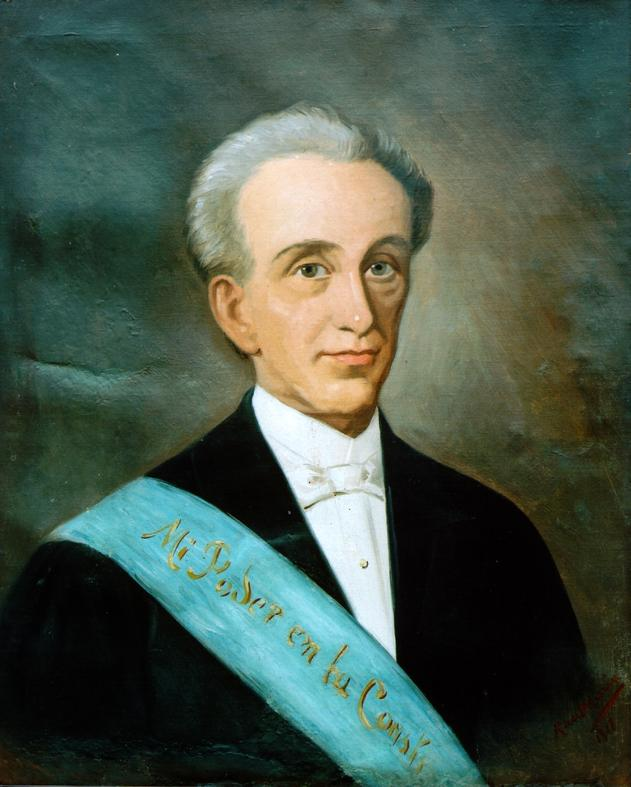

Nominee	Jerónimo Carrión	Manuel Gómez de la Torre Gangotena
Popular vote	21,733	8,211
Percentage	72.58%	27.42%
President before election
Gabriel García Moreno
Elected President
Jerónimo Carrión

Presidential elections were held in Ecuador in 1865. The result was a victory for Jerónimo Carrión, who received 73% of the vote. He took office on 7 September.

== Results ==
Candidate	Votes	%
Jerónimo Carrión	21,733	72.58
Manuel Gómez de la Torre Gangotena	8,211	27.42
Total	29,944	100.00
Source: TSE
