= 1863 Wisconsin lieutenant gubernatorial election =

- November 3, 1863
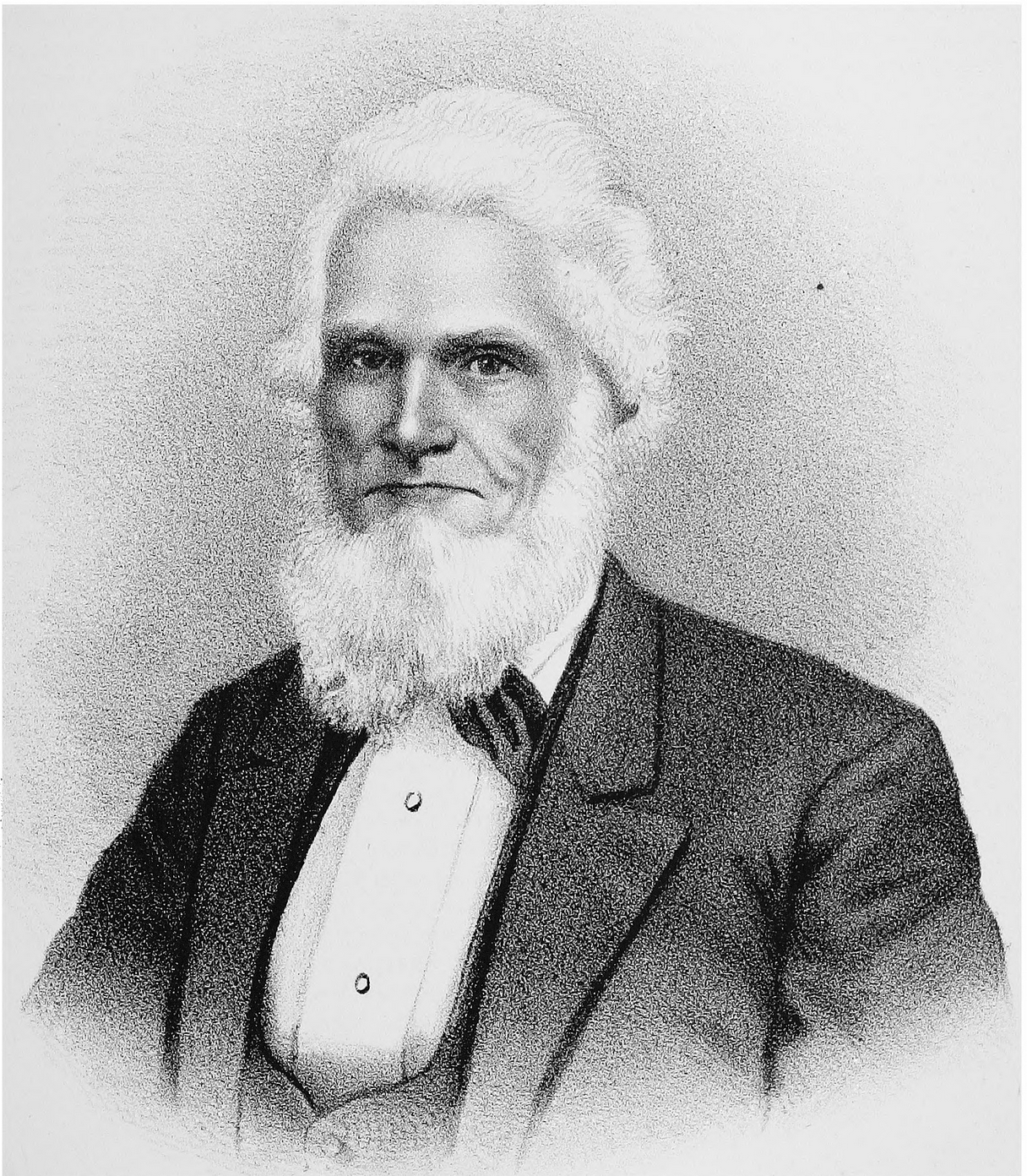

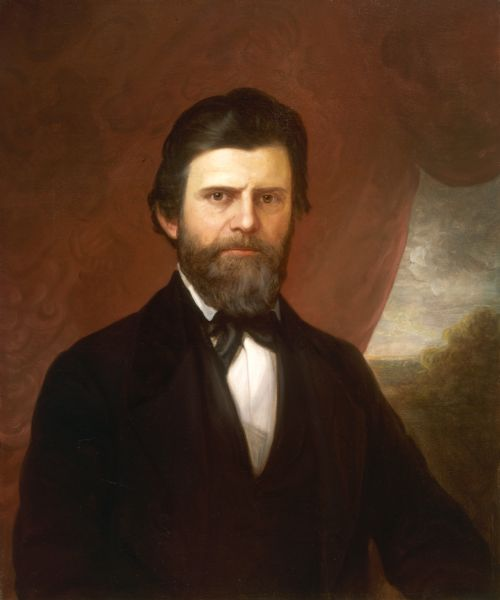
Nominee	Wyman Spooner	Nelson Dewey
Party	Republican	Democratic
Popular vote	72,526	49,282
Percentage	59.53%	40.45%
Lieutenant Governor before election
Edward Salomon
Republican
Elected Lieutenant Governor
Wyman Spooner
Republican

The 1863 Wisconsin lieutenant gubernatorial election was held on November 3, 1863, in order to elect the lieutenant governor of Wisconsin. Republican nominee and incumbent president pro tempore of the Wisconsin Senate Wyman Spooner defeated Democratic nominee and former Governor of Wisconsin Nelson Dewey.

== General election ==
On election day, November 3, 1863, Republican nominee Wyman Spooner won the election by a margin of 13,244 votes against his opponent Democratic nominee Nelson Dewey, thereby retaining Republican control over the office of lieutenant governor. Spooner was sworn in as the 9th lieutenant governor of Wisconsin in January 1864.

=== Results ===
Wisconsin lieutenant gubernatorial election, 1863
Party	Candidate	Votes	%
Republican	Wyman Spooner	72,526	59.53
Democratic	Nelson Dewey	49,282	40.45
	Scattering	19	0.02
Total votes		121,827	100.00
Republican hold			
