= Jacob D. Cox =

U.S. Politician from Ohio (1828–1900)

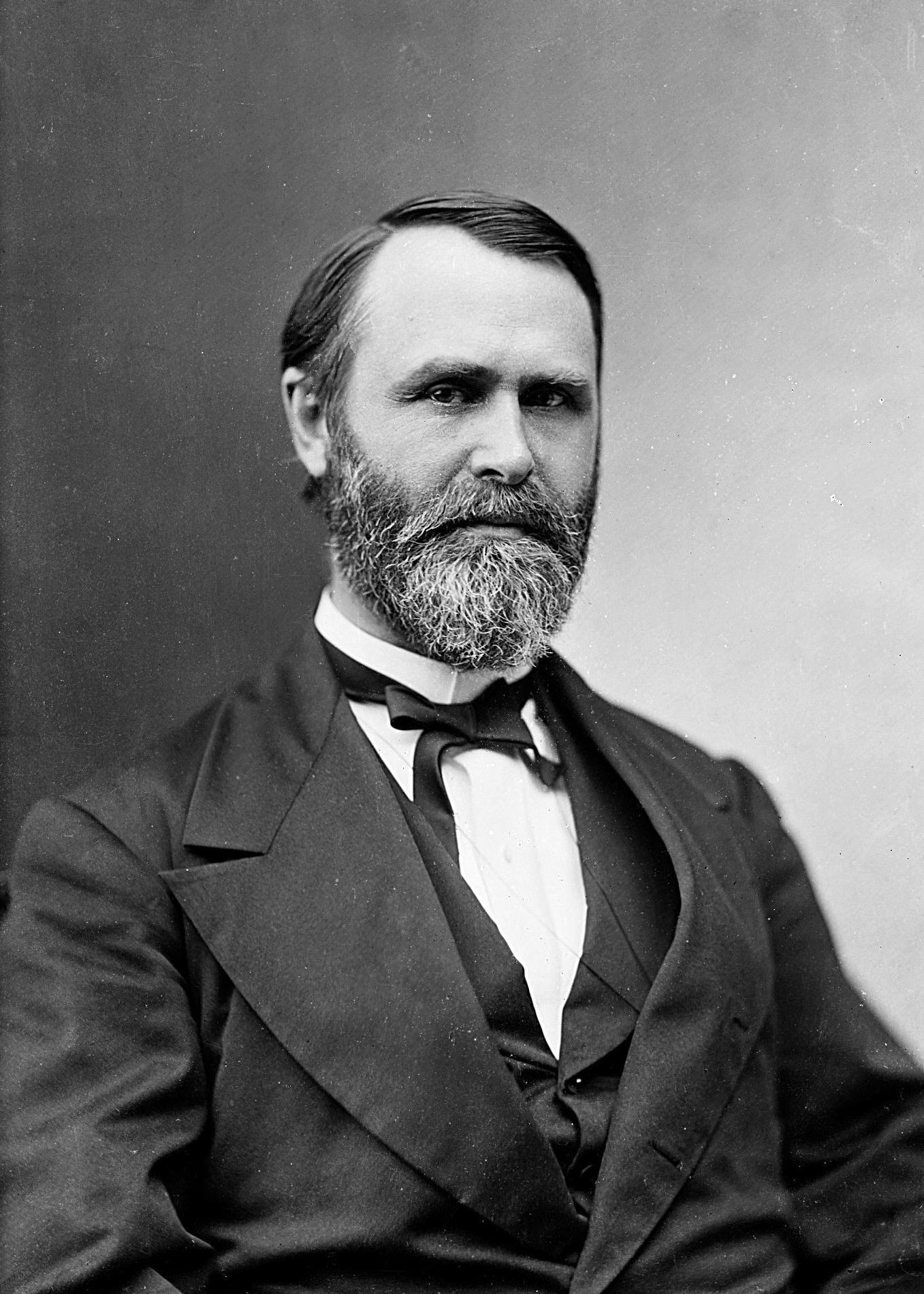
- Cox, 1870–1880

Member of the U.S. House of Representatives from Ohio's 6th district
- In office March 4, 1877 – March 3, 1879
- Preceded by: Frank H. Hurd
- Succeeded by: William D. Hill

15th President of the University of Cincinnati
- In office 1885–1889

10th United States Secretary of the Interior
- In office March 5, 1869 – October 31, 1870
- President: Ulysses S. Grant
- Preceded by: Orville Hickman Browning
- Succeeded by: Columbus Delano

28th Governor of Ohio
- In office January 8, 1866 – January 13, 1868
- Lieutenant: Andrew McBurney
- Preceded by: Charles Anderson
- Succeeded by: Rutherford B. Hayes

Member of the Ohio Senate from the 23rd district
- In office January 2, 1860 – January 5, 1862
- Preceded by: Robert Walker Tayler Sr.
- Succeeded by: Samuel Quinby

Personal details
- Born: Jacob Dolson Cox Jr. October 27, 1828 Montreal, Lower Canada
- Died: August 4, 1900 (aged 71) Gloucester, Massachusetts, U.S.
- Party: Republican
- Spouse: Helen Finney
- Education: Oberlin College (BA, MA)
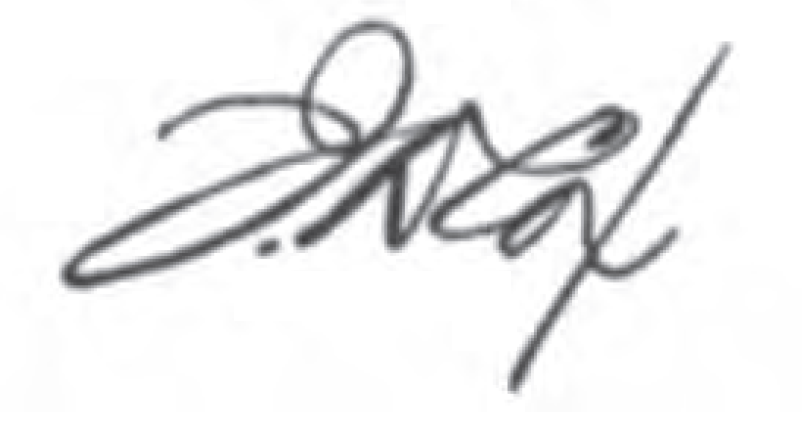
- Signature

Military service
- Allegiance: United States
- Branch/service: United States Army • Union Army
- Years of service: 1861–1866
- Rank: Major General
- Commands: Kanawha Division; XXIII Corps
- Battles/wars: American Civil War; Battle of Scary Creek; Battle of South Mountain; Battle of Antietam; Atlanta campaign; Battle of Utoy Creek; Battle of Franklin; Battle of Nashville; Battle of Wilmington; Battle of Wyse Fork

Jacob Dolson Cox Jr. (October 27, 1828 – August 4, 1900), was a statesman, lawyer, Union Army general during the American Civil War, Republican politician from Ohio, Liberal Republican Party founder, educator, author, and recognized microbiologist. He served as president of the University of Cincinnati, the 28th governor of Ohio and as United States Secretary of the Interior. As Governor of Ohio, Cox sided for a time with President Andrew Johnson's Reconstruction plan and was against African American suffrage in the South, though he supported it in Ohio. However, Cox increasingly expressed racist and segregationist viewpoints, advocating a separate colony for blacks to "work out their own salvation." Seeing himself caught between Johnson and the Radical Republicans, Cox decided not to run for reelection. He stayed out of politics for a year, though both Sherman and Grant advocated that Cox replace Stanton as Secretary of War as a means of stemming the demands for Johnson's impeachment. But Johnson declined. When Ulysses S. Grant became president, he nominated Cox Secretary of Interior, and Cox immediately accepted.

Secretary of Interior Cox implemented the first civil service reform in a federal government department, including examinations for most clerks. Grant initially supported Cox and civil service reform, creating America's first Civil Service Commission. However, Cox was opposed by Republican Party managers, who ultimately convinced Grant to cease civil service reforms in the Interior, a large department coveted for its vast Congressional patronage. President Grant and Secretary Cox were at odds over the fraudulent McGarahan Claims and the Dominican Republic annexation treaty. Secretary Cox advocated a lasting, honest, and comprehensive Indian policy legislated by Congress after the Piegan Indian massacre. Cox resigned as Secretary of Interior having been unable to gain Grant's support over civil service reform. Although Cox was a reformer, Grant had believed Cox had overstepped his authority as Secretary of Interior and had undermined his authority as president. In 1871 Cox helped found the Liberal Republicans in opposition to Grant's renomination. In 1876, Cox returned to politics and served one term as a United States Congressman from Ohio. Congressman Cox supported President Hayes's reform efforts, but his term as Congressman was unsuccessful at establishing permanent Civil Service reform.

Cox was elected as a member to the American Philosophical Society in 1870.

Cox was elected U.S. Representative (Ohio) and served in Congress from 1877 to 1879. Afterward, Cox never returned to active politics. Cox served as president and receiver of a railroad, Dean of Cincinnati Law School, and as president of the University of Cincinnati. Cox also studied microscopy and made hundreds of photo-micrographs, and in 1881 he was elected fellow of the Royal Microscopical Society. In 1882, Cox started a series of books he authored on Civil War campaigns, which remain today respected histories and memoirs. After Cox retired in 1897, he died in Massachusetts in 1900. Throughout the 20th century, Cox's life was mostly forgotten by historians, however, there has been renewed interest during the 21st century in Cox's military career as Union general during the Civil War, and his implementation of civil service while Secretary of Interior under President Grant, the first cabinet officer to do so in U.S. history.

== Early years and education ==
Jacob Dolson Cox was born in Montreal (then located in the British colonial Province of Lower Canada) on October 27, 1828. His father and mother respectively were Jacob Dolson Cox and Thedia Redelia (Kenyon) Cox, both Americans and residents of New York. His father Jacob was of Dutch origin, descended from Hanoverian emigrant Michael Cox (Koch) who arrived in New York in 1702. His mother Thedia was descended from Revolutionary War Connecticut soldier Payne Kenyon who was there when British General John Burgoyne surrendered at Saratoga in 1777. Thedia also was descended from Revolutionary War Connecticut soldier Freeman Allyn, who fought against Benedict Arnold at Groton. The Allyns were the early settlers of Salem and Manchester, Massachusetts. Thedia was additionally descended from the Elder William Brewster who emigrated to the Plymouth Colony on the Mayflower in 1620.

The elder Jacob was a New York building contractor and superintended the roof construction of the Church of Notre Dame in Montreal. Cox returned with his parents to New York City a year later. His early education included private readings with a Columbia College student. His family suffered a financial setback during the Panic of 1837, and Cox was unable to afford a college education and obtain a law degree. New York State law mandated that an alternative to college would be to work as an apprentice in the legal firm for seven years before entering the bar. In 1842, Cox entered into an apprenticeship for a legal firm and worked for two years. Having changed his mind on becoming a lawyer, Cox worked as a bookkeeper in a brokerage firm and studied mathematics and classical languages in his off hours. In 1846 he enrolled at Oberlin College in the preparatory school having been influenced by the Reverends Samuel D. Cochran and Charles Grandison Finney, leaders of Oberlin College to study theology and become a minister. Oberlin College was a progressive educational facility that was coeducational and admitted students of different races. He graduated from Oberlin with a degree in theology in 1850 or 1851. After a disagreement with his father-in-law over theology, Cox left his ministerial studies and became superintendent of the Warren, Ohio, school system. He studied law and was admitted to the bar in 1853.

== Marriage and family ==
While attending Oberlin, Cox married the eldest daughter of college president Finney in 1849; at age 19, Helen Clarissa Finney was already a widow with a small son. The couple lived with the president, but Cox and his father-in-law became estranged due to theological disputes. Cox was the father of the painter Kenyon Cox; his grandson, Allyn Cox, was a noted muralist.

== Political and military career ==
Cox was a Whig and had voted for Winfield Scott in 1852, having strong family abolitionist ties. As the Whig party dissolved, in 1855 Cox helped to organize the Republican Party in Ohio and stumped for its candidates in counties surrounding Warren. Cox was elected to the Ohio State Senate in 1859 and formed a political alliance with Senator and future President James A. Garfield, and with Governor Salmon P. Chase. While in the legislature, he accepted a commission with the Ohio Militia as a brigadier general and spent much of the winter of 1860–61 studying military science.

== Civil War ==
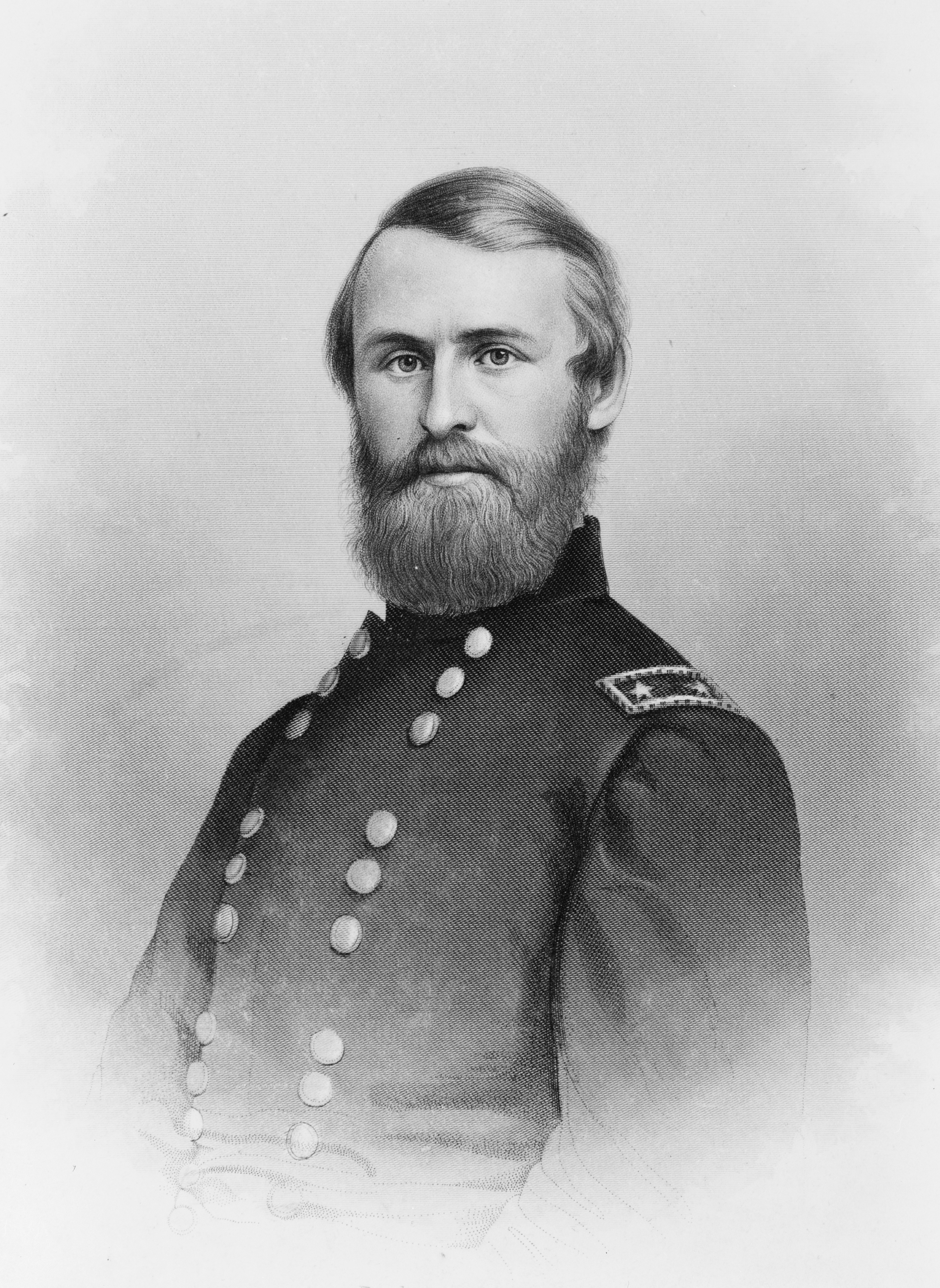
Major General Jacob D. Cox

At the start of the war, Cox was the father of six children (of the eight he and Helen eventually had), but he chose to enter Federal service as an Ohio volunteer. Cox had remained a member of the Ohio state Senate when the Civil War broke out at the Battle of Fort Sumter. Cox joined the Union Army to fulfill Ohio's Union quota of troops. On April 3, 1861, Cox was appointed Brigadier General of Ohio Volunteers by Ohio Governor William Dennison.

His first assignment was to command a recruiting camp near Columbus, and then the Kanawha Brigade of the Department of the Ohio. His brigade joined the Department of Western Virginia and fought successfully in the early Kanawha Valley campaign under Maj. Gen. George B. McClellan. In 1862 the brigade moved to Washington, D.C., and was attached to John Pope's Army of Virginia, but was delayed by McClellan and so did not see action at the Second Battle of Bull Run with the rest of the army. At the beginning of the Maryland Campaign, Cox's brigade became the Kanawha Division of the IX Corps of the Army of the Potomac. In the Maryland campaign, Cox's men took the important city of Frederick, Maryland, and Cox led the assault on the Confederates on September 14, 1862, at the Battle of South Mountain. When corps commander Maj. Gen. Jesse L. Reno was killed at South Mountain, Cox assumed command of the IX Corps. He suggested to Maj. Gen. Ambrose Burnside, formally the commander of IX Corps, but who was commanding a two-corps "wing" of the Army, that he be allowed to return to division command, which was more in keeping with his level of military experience. Burnside refused the suggestion but kept Cox under his supervision at the Battle of Antietam. Burnside allowed Cox to execute all orders from McClellan at the battle, while he remained behind the lines. Cox's advancing IX Corps came within minutes of overwhelming the Confederate right wing at Antietam, when they were hit by A.P. Hill's division, which forced Cox to withdraw closer to Union lines.

After Antietam, Cox was appointed major general to rank from October 6, 1862, but this appointment expired the following March when the United States Senate felt that there were too many generals of this rank already serving. He was later renominated and confirmed on December 7, 1864. Most of 1863 was quiet for Cox, who was assigned to command the District of Ohio, and later the District of Michigan, in the Department of Ohio.

During the Atlanta, Franklin-Nashville, and Carolinas campaigns of 1864–65, Cox commanded the 3rd Division of the XXIII Corps of the Army of the Ohio, under Maj. Gen. John M. Schofield. His 3rd Division provided the main effort in the assault at the Battle of Utoy Creek, August 6, 1864. Cox's men broke the Confederate supply line on the Macon and Western Railroad on August 31, leading Confederate General John Bell Hood to abandon Atlanta. During Hood's Tennessee Campaign, Cox and his troops narrowly escaped being surrounded by Hood at Spring Hill, Tennessee, and he is credited with saving the center of the Union battle line at the Battle of Franklin in November 1864. Cox led the 3rd Division at the Battle of Wilmington in North Carolina, then took command of the District of Beaufort and a Provisional Corps, which he led at the Battle of Wyse Fork, before it was officially designated the XXIII Corps.

== Governor of Ohio ==
Before mustering out of the Army on January 1, 1866, Cox was elected governor of Ohio in October 1865. He served from 1866 to 1868, and post-war issues were dealt with during his tenure. However, his regressive views on African-American suffrage and his earlier endorsement of President Andrew Johnson's Reconstruction policy caused him to decide not to run for reelection, having lacked the ability to resolve the division between Ohio Radical Republicans and President Johnson. Cox viewed opposition towards black suffrage and advocacy of segregation as a winning formula for the Ohio GOP, telling Radical Republican colleague James Garfield regarding racial equality: "On that issue, if made, you will be beaten."

Cox then moved to Cincinnati to practice law.

== Secretary of the Interior (1869–1870) ==
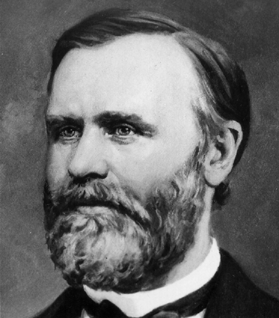
Jacob D. Cox Secretary of Interior

Cox was appointed Secretary of the Interior by President Ulysses S. Grant upon his March 4, 1869 Inauguration. Cox served from March 5 to October 31, 1870, a total of 575 days in office. Cox was an effective advocate of civil service reform and introduced a merit system and testing for appointees. His nomination was accepted by reformers and he was immediately confirmed by the Senate. Grant initially gave Cox the freedom to run his department as he saw fit "focused on public service as an advocation, not a career." However, after Grant failed to back him up against Republican politicians who thrived on the patronage system then rampant in the Interior Department, Cox resigned. As Secretary of Interior Cox was considered an independent thinker. This countered Grant's instincts as a military general believing Cox was acting insubordinate to his presidency. Grant's own view on Cox's resignation, possibly unfairly, was that, "The trouble was that General Cox thought the Interior Department was the whole government, and that Cox was the Interior Department."

=== Implemented civil service reform ===
After the Mexican–American War the United States acquired more territories and the Interior Department expanded enormously. Cox's responsibilities varied widely, and he administered the Patent, Land, Pensions, and Indian Affairs Offices, the Census, marshalls, and officials of federal court, and was in charge of transcontinental railroads. The growth of the Interior Department had also expanded a spoils system of patronage that many reformers believed was corrupt. The distribution of federal jobs by Congressional legislators was considered vital for their reelection to Congress. Grant required that all applicants to federal jobs apply directly to the Department heads, rather than the president. This gave Cox the authority and opportunity to reform the Interior Department's personnel system.

Secretary Cox was an enthusiastic advocate of civil service reform and upon assuming office he was the first federal department head to implement a civil service merit system in a federal department. Cox's reforms were to limit the spoils system and check the expansion of the federal government's power and influence. Cox fired a third of the clerks unqualified to hold office, and he instituted examinations in the Patent and Census Offices for most applicants, while he requested clerks working in the Patent Office to take the examinations to prove they were worthy to hold office. Many clerks resigned on their own rather than take the examinations. Cox even declined to give his brother a job in the Interior, saying he did not want to be charged with nepotism. Cox's moralistic approach to civil service reform would eventually clash with President Grant's practical use of patronage appointment powers.

By mid-May 1870, Cox's reforms clashed with the patronage driven political system and its leaders. Congressional Republican committee leaders demanded that Cox give departmental employees the "opportunity" to give political assessments. Cox responded that "no subscriptions to political funds or show of political zeal will secure their retention." Cox made contributions voluntary, but the ability to pass civil service examinations would remain mandatory, to keep their jobs. Cox said that mandatory contributions would be distressful to the employees families financially.

The breaking point came between Cox and Congressional patronage powers, when Cox implemented a 30-day paid leave policy on federal employees at the Interior Department, in part used for the fall campaign. Workers would not be paid for extra days off after the 30-day limit. Prior to electric air conditioning, the hot Summer of 1870 caused employees to use up most of their 30-day vacation time, leaving only a few days of paid campaigning. Many clerks complained to party leaders Senator Zachariah Chandler and Senator Simon Cameron, saying they could not campaign, putting the blame on Cox's 30 vacation policy. Cameron was reported to have said, "Damn Secretary Cox ! We'll see the President about this fool business." The pressure from party leaders worked, and on October 3, 1870, Grant overturned Cox's 30 day vacation rule.

=== Dominican Republic annexation treaty ===
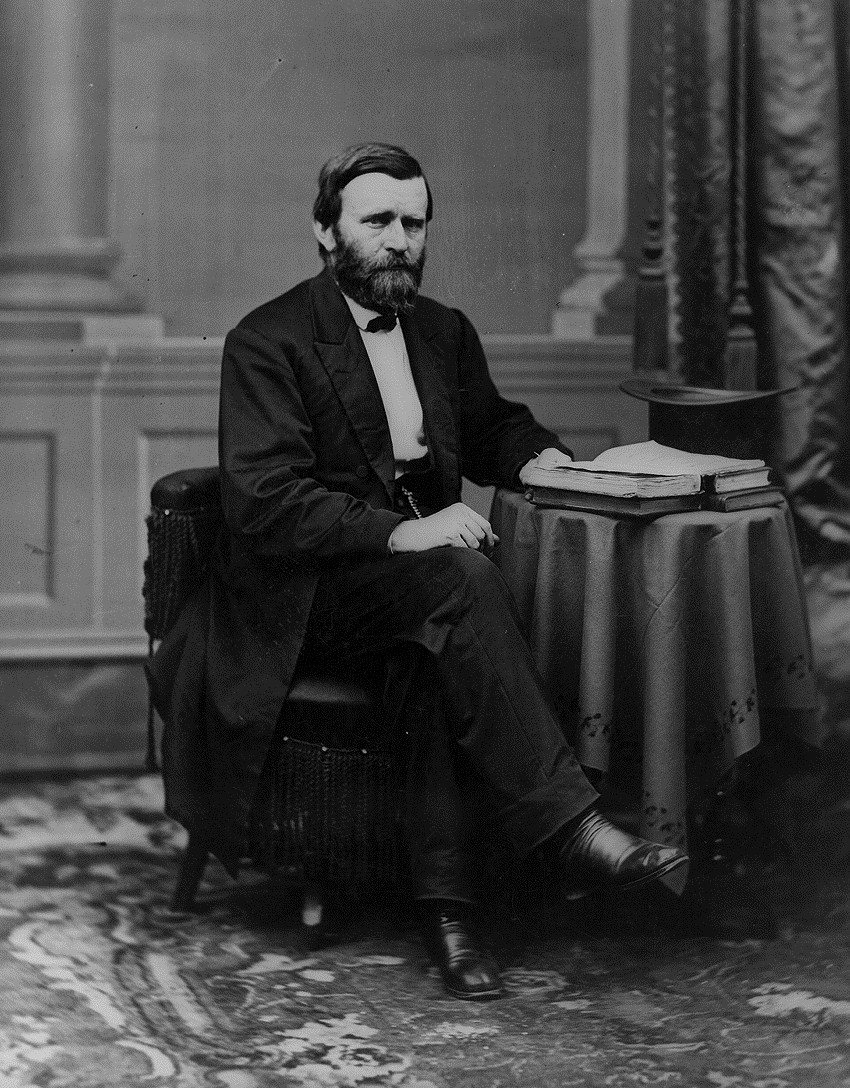
Ulysses S. Grant President of the United States

Even before Grant became president, an annexationist faction in American politics desired control over the Caribbean islands. William H. Seward, Secretary of State under Lincoln and Johnson, having purchased Alaska from the Russians and attempted to buy the Danish West Indies from the Danes, began negotiations to purchase the Dominican Republic, then referred to as Santo Domingo. These negotiations continued under Grant, led by Orville E. Babcock, a confidant who had served on Grant's staff during the Civil War. Grant was initially skeptical, but at the urging of Admiral Porter, who wanted a naval base at Samaná Bay, and Joseph W. Fabens, a New England businessman employed by the Dominican government, Grant examined the matter and became convinced of its wisdom. Grant believed in peaceful expansion of the nation's borders and thought the majority-black island would allow new economic opportunities for freedmen. The acquisition, according to Grant, would ease race relations in the South, clear slavery from Brazil and Cuba, and increase American naval power in the Caribbean.

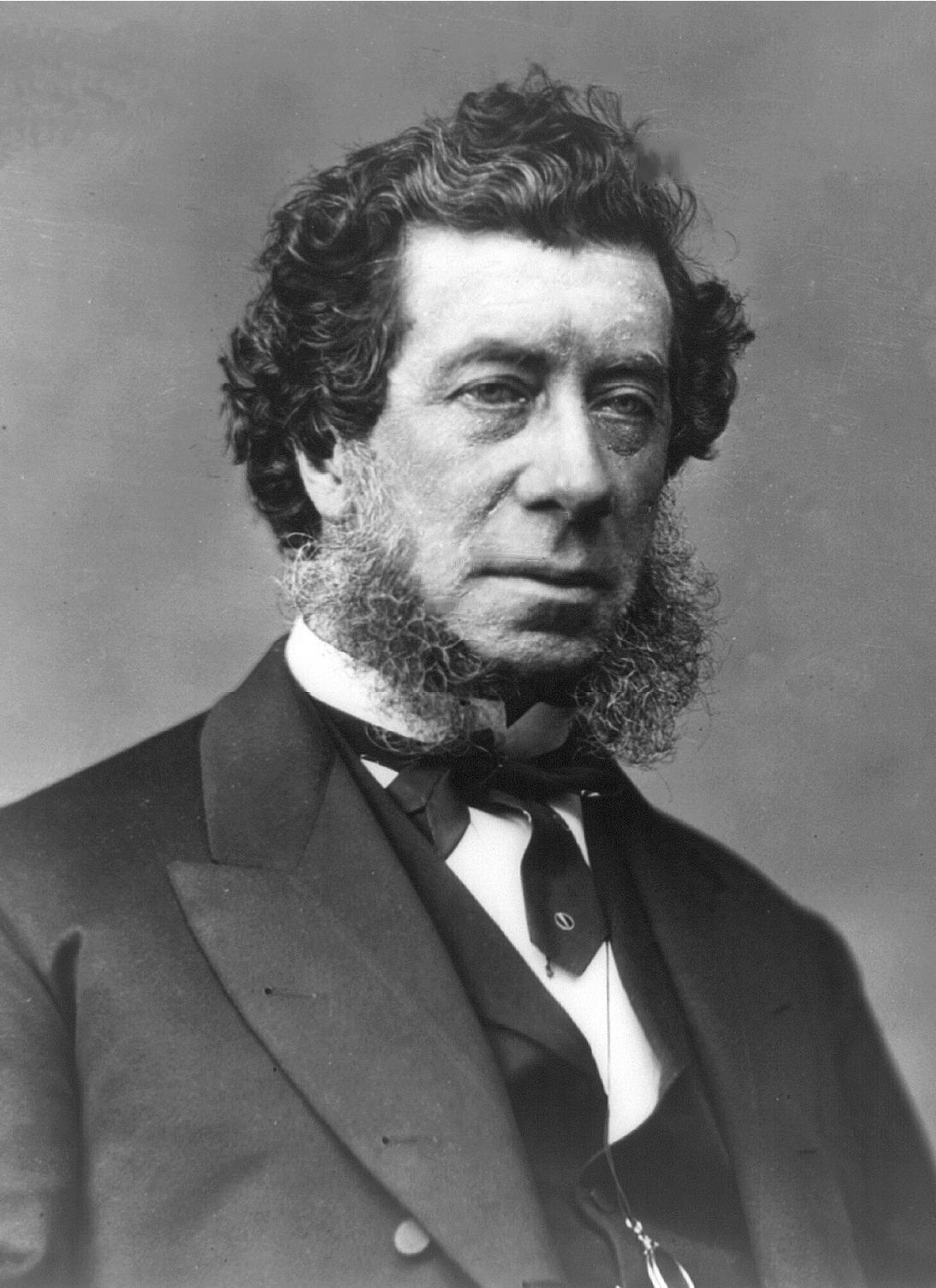
Hamiltion Fish Secretary of State

Grant sent Babcock to consult with Buenaventura Báez, the pro-annexation Dominican president, to see if the proposal was practical; Babcock returned with a draft treaty of annexation in December 1869. Secretary of State Hamilton Fish told Cox in a private meeting that Babcock had no authorization to make such a treaty. Going against his normal protocol of listening to each Cabinet member, Grant revealed Babcock's unauthorized treaty to his cabinet without discussion. Grant casually told his Cabinet he knew Babcock had no authority to make the treaty but he could remedy this by having the treaty authorized by the United States Dominican Republic Consul. All of the Cabinet kept quiet until Secretary Cox spoke up and asked Grant, "But Mr. President, has it been settled, then, that we want to annex Santo Domingo?" Grant blushed and was embarrassed by Cox's direct questioning. Grant then turned to his left looking at Secretary Fish and then turned to his right looking at Secretary of Treasury George S. Boutwell, puffing hard on his cigar. The uncomfortable silence continued until President Grant ordered another item of business. The assembled Cabinet never again spoke on Santo Domingo. Grant personally lobbied Senators to pass the treaty, going so far as to visit Charles Sumner at his home. Fish out of loyalty to Grant authorized and submitted the treaty. The Senate, led by the opposition of Sumner, refused to pass the treaty.

=== Indian affairs ===
After the Piegan Indian massacre in January 1870, Secretary Cox in March 1870 demanded that Congress implement definitive and lasting legislation on Indian Policy. President Grant, who desired that Indians become "civilized," had created the Board of Indian Commissioners in 1869 under his Peace policy. Cox defended the integrity of the Commissioners appointed by President Grant. The massacre indirectly helped keep the Bureau of Indian Affairs under the Department of Interior, rather than be transferred to the Department of War. Cox believed that industrial progress such as railroads and telegraph lines were no excuse to break treaties with the Indians. Cox believed that Native Americans derived no benefits from frontier towns that took away pasture lands from the buffalo herds, an Indian food staple. Cox believed that keeping promises to the Indians, rather than breaking treaties, was essential for peace. Cox, however, viewed Indians had low intelligence, were conceited, and made poor diplomats. In 1871, after Cox had resigned from office, Congress and President Grant created a comprehensive law that ended the Indian treaty system; the law treated individual Native Americans as wards of the federal government, rather than dealing with the tribes as sovereign entities.

Sioux Chiefs meet with Cox in June 1870.

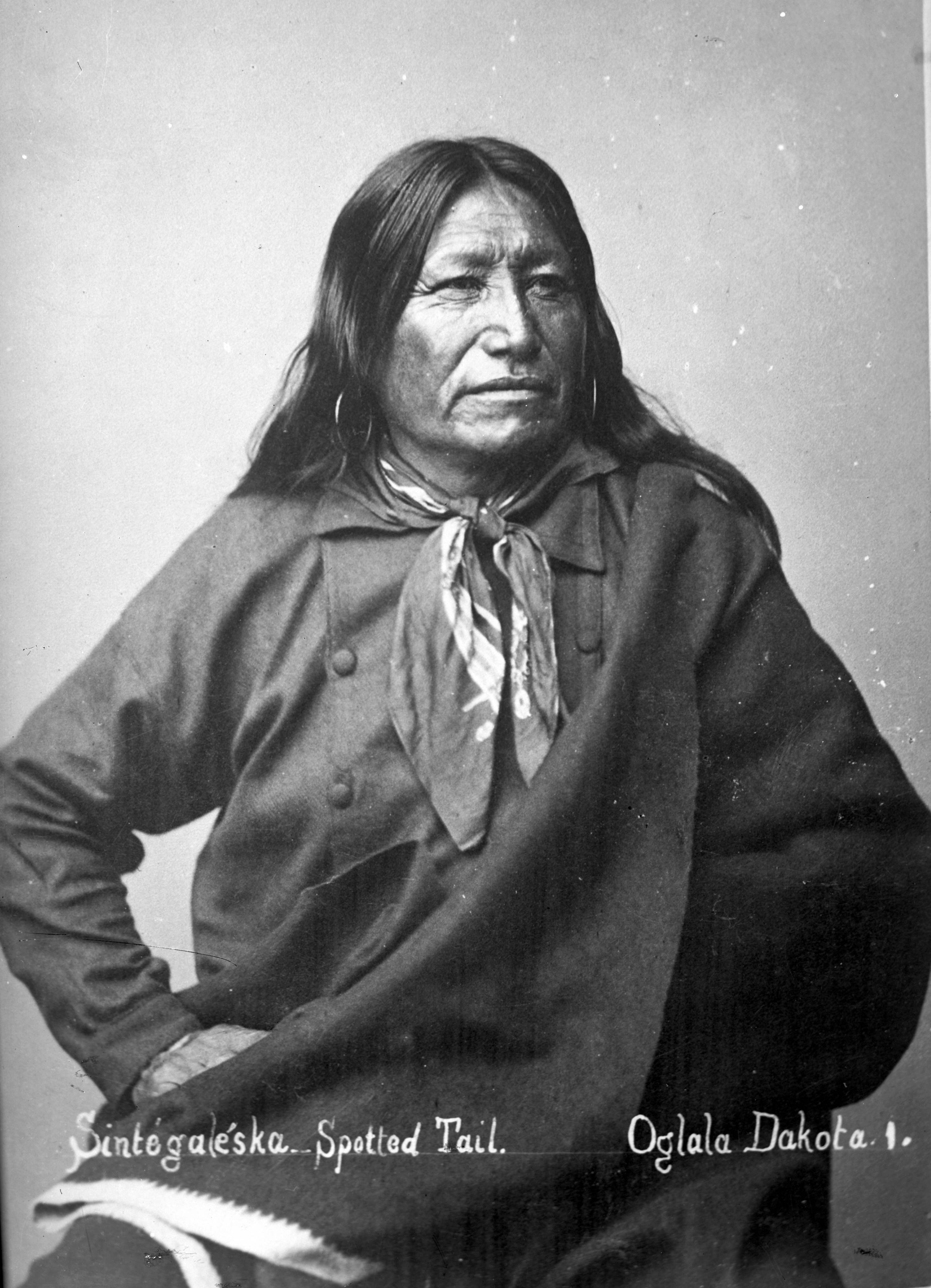
Spotted Tail

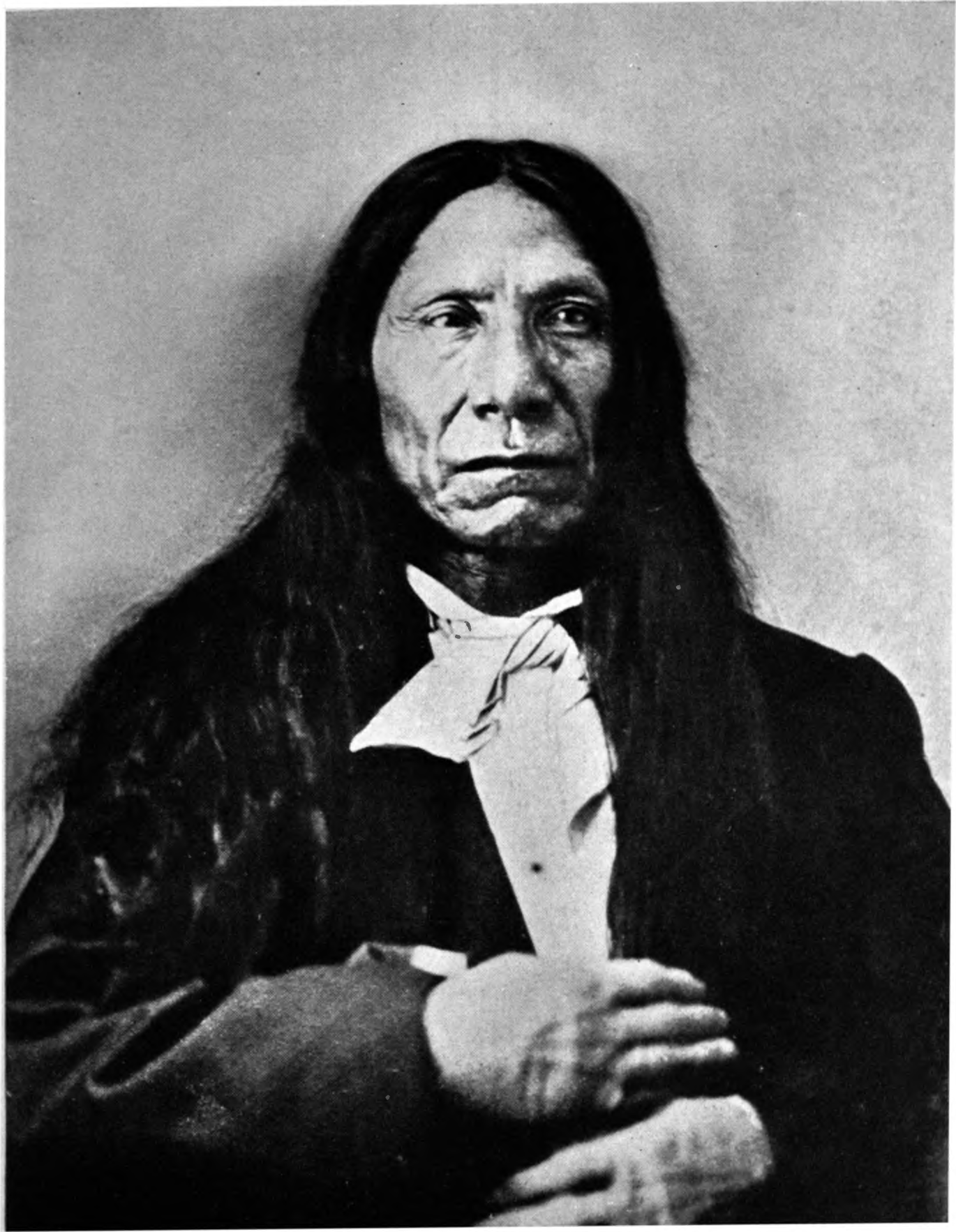
Red Cloud

In early 1870, Sioux Indians in Wyoming, under the leadership of Chief Red Cloud and Chief Spotted Tail, were upset as white settlers encroached on Indian land. To avoid war, Red Cloud asked to see President Grant, who along with Spotted Tail, were allowed to journey East to Washington. Cox looked forward to their visit, hoping to convince the Sioux chiefs of the federal government's commitment to Indian treaties, and also to impress them with the power and grandeur of the nation, so they would be fearful of making war. Arriving in Washington, the chiefs had conversations with Cox, Ely Parker, and President Grant. On June 1, the chiefs were given a tour of Washington, but failed to be awed into submission. On June 2, Cox was scolded by Spotted Tail for not keeping the Treaty of 1868. In response, Cox lectured Spotted Tail that complaining was not manly, and that the Grant administration's Indian policies had positive results. Spotted Tail jested to Cox, that Cox would have slit his throat if he had to live through the troubles Spotted Tail was forced to endure. On June 3, Red Cloud took a similar tack as Spotted Tail, emphasizing he would not give up the old ways. Red Cloud asked Cox for food and ammunition so his people could hunt and not starve, railed against broken treaties, and forcing Indians into starvation. Cox put the chiefs off and told them they would speak with President Grant.

On June 7, Cox attempted to placate the Indian chiefs that President Grant, the "Great White Father", acted not out of fear, but had the desire to do the right thing. Cox told the Indians they would get all they asked for, except for guns, and Cox personally promised to see the treaties were kept to the letter. Meeting the Indians, President Grant was warm and welcome and emphasized the same sentiments as Cox. Grant gave the chiefs a formal State Dinner at the White House, that proved to emphasize a clash of two cultures. The chiefs were given fine foods and wine but were especially fond of strawberry ice cream. Spotted Tail was reported to have commented that his white hosts ate far better foods than the rations sent to the Indians. At their final meeting, Cox offered several more concessions, and allowed the Indians to give names of agents they would prefer to act as interlocutors with the government. Cox also promised to give the chiefs seventeen horses. Red Cloud apologized to Cox for his rudeness, while Cox promised to promote Indian interest. Before returning to Wyoming the Indians visited New York City, and the philanthropist eastern papers demanded a more generous Sioux policy. Cox sent the Indians the promised seventeen horses and arranged for a group of reformers to accompany the promised goods. The arrival of the aid package did much to calm the situation and war was averted. One historian noted that the Washington visit was a success, while Red Cloud adopted a policy of diplomacy rather than war.

=== McGarrahan claims and resignation ===
In August 1870, Secretary Cox came into conflict with President Grant over the fraudulent McGarrahan claims. Grant wanted the McGarrahan claims either settled by Congress or if Congress failed to do so then his administration. Although Grant believed there was fraud in the matter he wanted the McGarrahan claims settled. Cox, however, in a letter to the President, told Grant that he wanted nothing to do with the McGarrahan claims, believing that McGarrahan was entirely fraudulent in asking for a patent on land claims in California. Cox stated that one of McGarrahan's attorneys was instructed to bribe Cox $20,000 for him to approve that patent. McGarrahan had applied for a patent on California agriculture land to be bought up at a low price. However, the land was actually used for gold mining purposes. Cox appealed to Grant not to have Cox appear before a District Court in regards to the McGarrahan claims and to hold a Cabinet meeting over the matter. Cox believed that the District Court had no jurisdiction over that matter and that the Department of Interior had sole jurisdiction. When Grant gave no support to Cox over not appearing before the court, Cox saw this as an additional reason for not continuing in office—though civil service reform was the proximate cause of his resignation.

== Liberal Republican revolt (1870–1872) ==
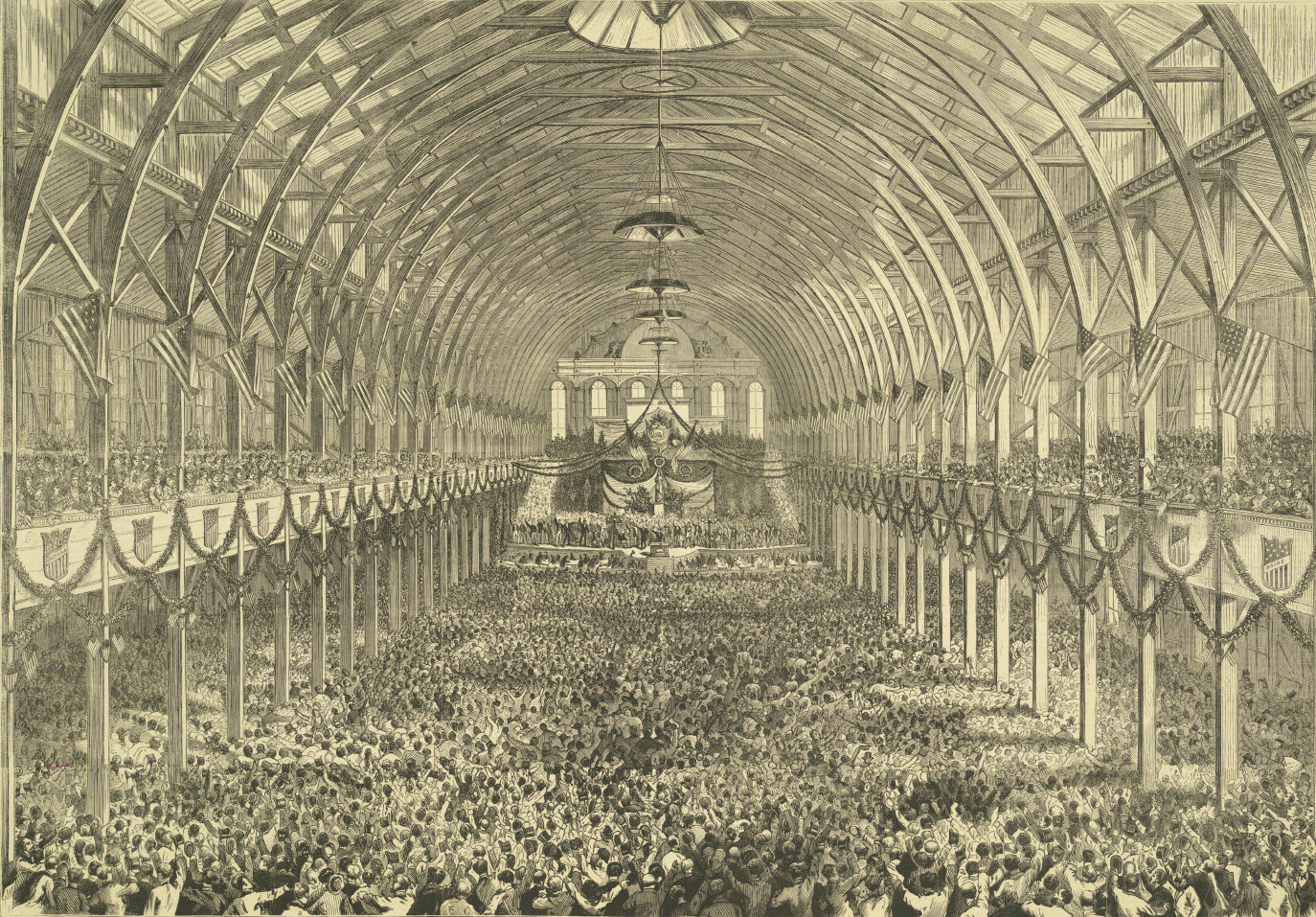
Liberal Republican Party Convention May 1872

Dissatisfaction over the Grant administration, his appointments of family and friends, corruption at the New York Customs House, and his attempt to annex Santo Domingo, led many reformers to seek new leadership. Grant's prosecution of the Ku Klux Klan alienated a fraction of former Republican allies, who believed civil service reform should have priority over civil rights of blacks. In 1870, Senator Carl Schurz of Missouri, a German immigrant, bolted from the regular Republican Party. After Cox resigned office the same year, many reformers believed that Grant was incapable of reforming civil service. Grant, however, had yet not given up on civil service reform and he created the Civil Service Commission, authorized and funded by Congress, whose rules would be effective January 1, 1872. Grant appointed reformer and Harper's Weekly editor George William Curtis to head the commission. Grant appointee Columbus Delano, Grant's third cousin and replacement of Cox, however, exempted the Interior Department from the commission's rules, later saying the department was too large for compliance.

In March 1871, a disgruntled Cox organized a breakaway nucleus of reforming Republicans in Cincinnati, when 100 Republicans signed a pact, separating themselves from the regular Republican Party, calling themselves Liberal Republicans. Schurz, now considered a Liberal Republican ringleader, advocated full amnesty for former Confederates. The new party demanded "civil service reform, sound money, low tariffs, and state's rights." Meeting on May 1, 1872, at their convention held in Cincinnati, the Liberal Republicans nominated New York Tribune editor Horace Greeley for President of the United States. Cox had been mentioned for the presidency, but he was not put on the ballot. Reformers had favored Charles Francis Adams for president and he was put on the ballot, but he could not obtain enough votes to capture the nomination. Cox was against Greeley's nomination and withdrew his support for the Liberal Republican revolt. Greeley, in effect, took the campaign from reformers, attacking Grant's Reconstruction policy, rather than making reform the primary goal. Grant, who was renominated by the regular Republican Party, easily won reelection over Greeley, having captured 56% of the popular vote.

Cox was considered as a U.S. Senate candidate in the 1872 election, but the Ohio legislature selected a more pro-civil rights Republican. At this time U.S. Senators were chosen by state legislatures rather than by popular vote.

== Later years ==
=== Railroad president and receiver (1873–78) ===
In October 1873, Cox was made President and Receiver of the Toledo and Wabash Railroad. Cox moved to Toledo, Ohio, to take charge of the property. He served from 1873 to 1878.

=== U.S. Representative (1877–79) ===
Republican Party candidate Cox was elected to the United States House of Representatives from Toledo in 1876. Cox served a single term in the Forty-Fifth Congress from 1877 to 1879. Cox defeated Democratic Party candidate Frank H. Hurd. Cox received 17,276 votes against Hurd who received 15,361 votes. Cox represented the Sixth District of Ohio that included Fulton, Henry, Lucas, Ottawa, Williams, and Wood counties. Cox declined to run for a second term.

=== Cincinnati Law School dean (1881–97) ===
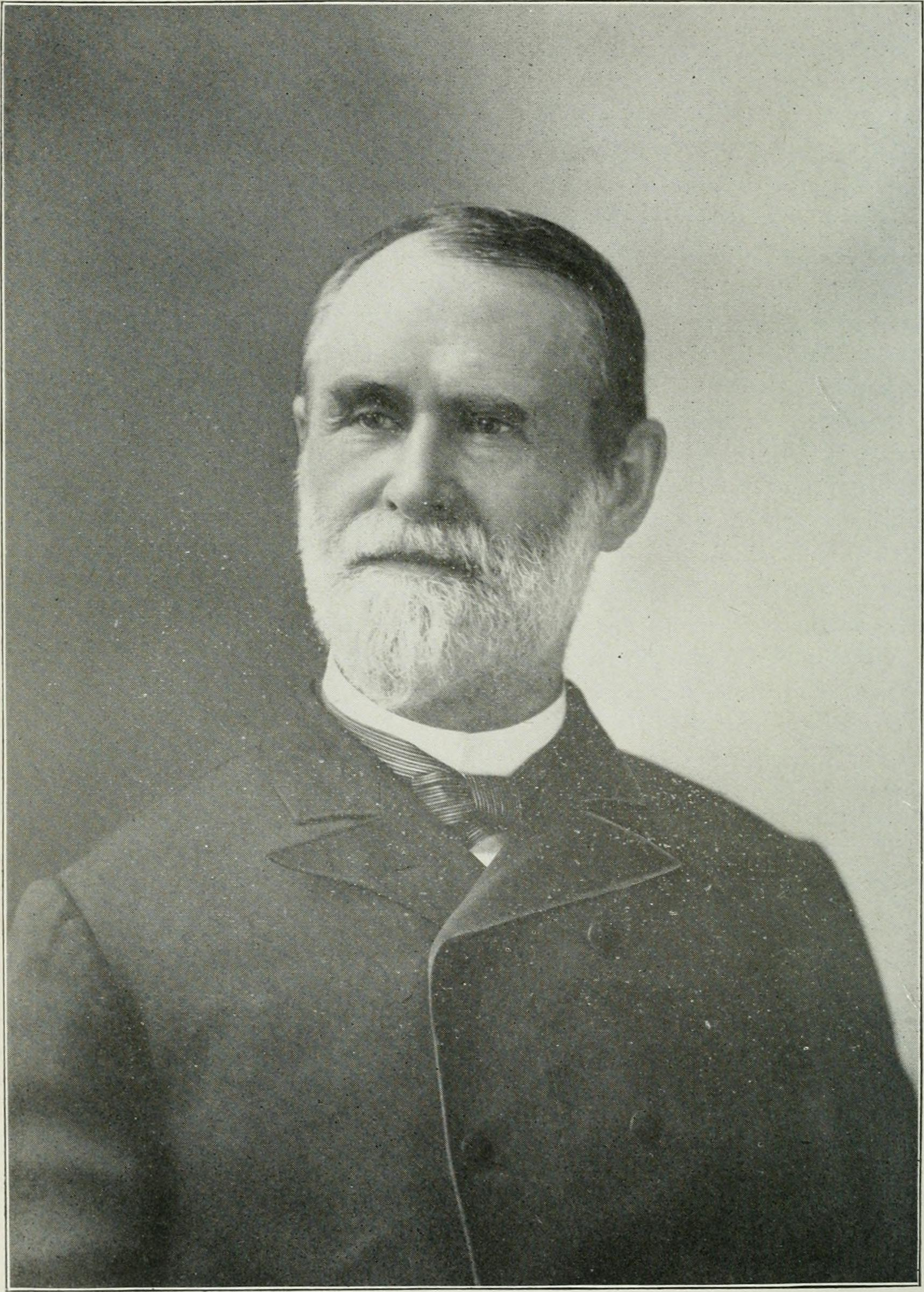
Jacob Dolson Cox

He then returned to Cincinnati, serving as Dean of the Cincinnati Law School from 1881 to 1897. After retiring from his position as dean, he was urged by President William McKinley to accept the position of U.S. ambassador to Spain, but declined, having strong anti-imperialist views

=== University of Cincinnati president (1885–89) ===
Cox was President of the University of Cincinnati from 1885 to 1889.

=== Military historian and author ===
During his later years, Cox was a prolific author. His works include Atlanta (published in 1882); The March to the Sea: Franklin and Nashville (1882); The Second Battle of Bull Run (1882); The Battle of Franklin, Tennessee (1897); and Military Reminiscences of the Civil War (1900). His books are still cited by scholars, and his memoirs contain incisive analyses of military practice and events.

== Death and burial ==
Cox died on summer vacation at Gloucester, Massachusetts. He is buried in Spring Grove Cemetery, Cincinnati.

== Historical reputation ==
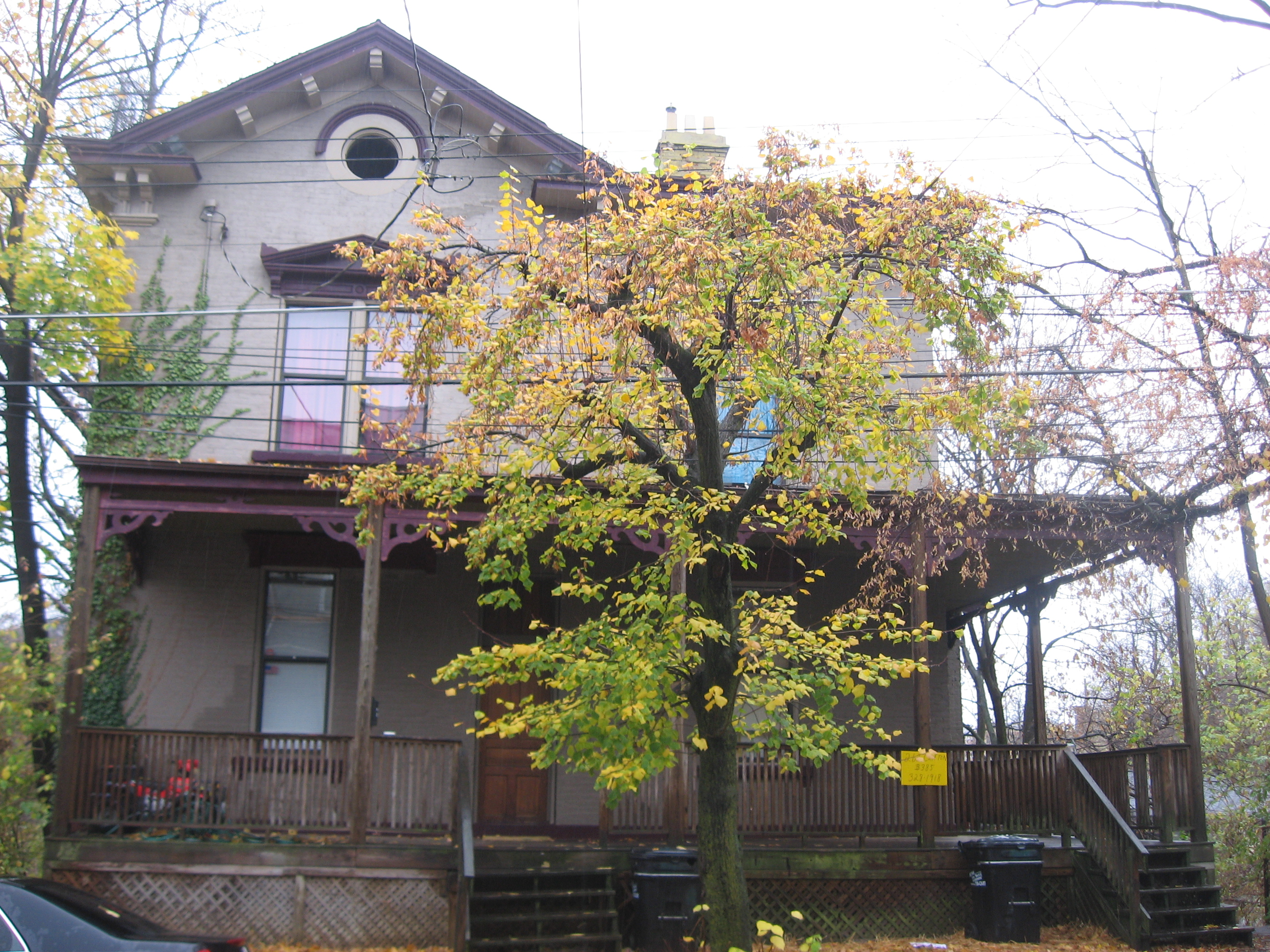
Cox's home in Cincinnati

With the exception of dissertations and a few biographical articles, there were no 20th-century book biographies of Cox's entire life. In 1901, historian William Cox Cochran authored a 35-page book titled General Jacob Dolson Cox: Early Life and Military Services published by Bibliotheca Sacra Company in Oberlin, Ohio. The Biographical Dictionary of America published in 1906 by the American Biographical Society, edited by Rossiter Johnson, had a biographical article on Cox, that included a sketch portrait of Cox. Volume 4 of Dictionary of American Biography, edited by Dumas Malone, published in 1930 by Charles Scribner's Sons, has a biographical article on Cox, authored by Homer Carey Hockett (H.C.H.). In 2014, historian Eugene D. Schmiel authored Citizen-General: Jacob Dolson Cox and the Civil War Era book biography on Cox's entire life.

According to historian Donald K. Pickens, Cox "was a fascinating figure, very much part of his time, yet his various interests and achievements set him apart from his contemporaries." Pickens said Cox was an effective Secretary of Interior, "following Grant's policy of eventual assimilation of American Indians." Cox's endorsement of civil service reform was in opposition to powerful Republican Senators. Historian Ron Chernow said Cox was a conservative on Grant's cabinet, preaching against black suffrage and favored racial segregation, but "he enjoyed a reputation of an efficient administrator and an energetic ally of civil service reform." Historian Eugene D. Schmiel said Cox, as Grant's Secretary of Interior, "implemented one of the most far-reaching attempts to reform Indian Policy and instituted the federal government's first extensive civil service reform." Schmiel said "knowledge of Cox the citizen-general is limited, and he remains a relative unknown except to specialists and buffs." Concerning Cox's published military works, historian H.C.H. said that Cox, in general, was "recognized as an elegant and forceful writer, of fine critical ability and impartial judgement, one of the foremost military historians of the country."

Built in 1880, Cox's home in Cincinnati is listed on the National Register of Historic Places. The Cox Administration Building (designed by Cass Gilbert) at Oberlin College is named in his honor.

== Microscopy studies (1873–1895) ==
Around 1873, Cox became interested the study of microscopy and took it up as a recreational hobby. Cox's first studies were on fresh water forms, including rotatoria and diatomaceae. Cox displayed painstaking thoroughness and logical analysis in his microscopical studies, keeping notes of his work and observations. In 1874, Cox took up the study of photo-micrography, and in 1875 he began making a series of photo-micrographs of diatomaceae, that totaled several hundred in number.

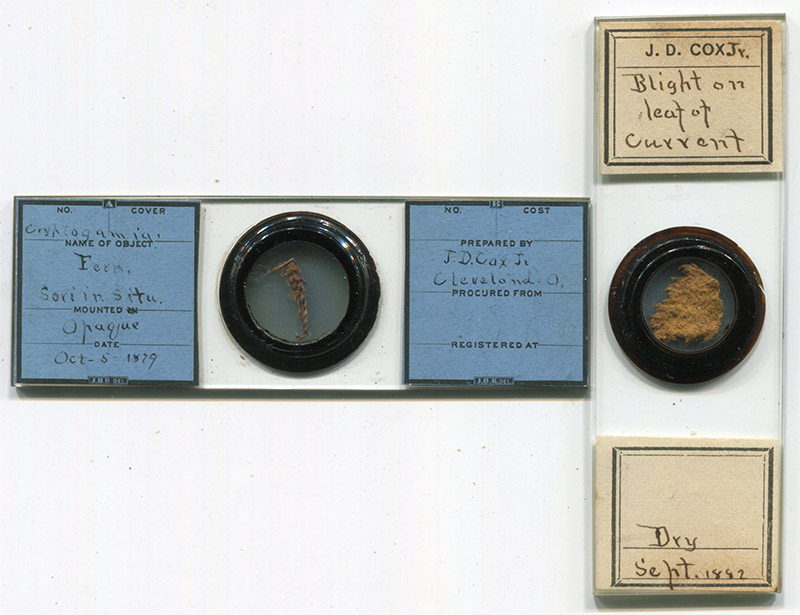
Two microscope slides prepared by Cox

In 1881, Cox was elected fellow of the Royal Microscopical Society. Cox gave up microscopical study in 1895, believing it damaged his eyes, but his interest in microscopy remained lifelong.

== See also ==
- List of American Civil War generals (Union)
- List of United States governors born outside the United States

== Sources ==
Books by author

- Brands, H. W. (2012). The Man Who Saved the Union: Ulysses S. Grant in War and Peace. New York: Doubleday. ISBN 978-0-385-53241-9.
- Chernow, Ron (2017). Grant. New York: Penguin Press. ISBN 978-1-5942-0487-6.
- Eicher, John H.; Eicher, David L. (2001). Civil War High Commands. Stanford, CA: Stanford University Press. ISBN 0-8047-3641-3.
- Hockett, Homer Carey (1930). Allen Johnson; Dumas Malone (eds.). Dictionary of American Biography Cox Jacob Dolson. New York City: Charles Scribner's Sons.
- Martin, Edward Winslow (1869). The New Administration. New York: George S. Wilcox. pp. 93–121.
- McFeely, William S. (1981). Grant: A Biography. Norton. ISBN 0-393-01372-3.
- Pickens, Donald K. (2006). Richard Zuczek (ed.). Encyclopedia of the Reconstruction Era: A-L. Vol. 1. Westport, Connecticut: Greenwood Press. pp. 180–181. ISBN 0-313-33074-3.
- Reid, Whitelaw (1895). "Jacob Dolson Cox". Ohio in the War Her Statesmen Generals and Soldiers. Vol. 1. Cincinnati: The Robert Clarke Company. pp. 770–777.
- Schmiel, Eugene D. (2014). Citizen-General: Jacob Dolson Cox and the Civil War Era. Athens, Ohio: Ohio University Press. ISBN 978-0-8214-2082-9.
- Smith, Jean Edward (2001). Grant. New York: Simon & Schuster. ISBN 978-0684849270.
- Simon, John Y. (2002). "Ulysses S. Grant". In Graff, Henry (ed.). The Presidents: A Reference History (7th ed.). pp. 245–260. ISBN 0-684-80551-0.
- Vorce, C.M. (1901). Transactions of the American Microscopical Society Necrology Jacob Dolson Cox. Vol. XXII. State Journal Company, Printers. pp. 197–202.
- Warner, Ezra J. (1964). Generals in Blue: Lives of the Union Commanders. Baton Rouge: Louisiana State University Press. ISBN 0-8071-0822-7.
- White, Ronald C. (2016). American Ulysses: A Life of Ulysses S. Grant. Random House Publishing Group. ISBN 978-1-5883-6992-5.

Books by editor

- Rossiter Johnson, ed. (1906). The Biographical Dictionary of America. Boston: American Biographical Society. pp. 21–22.
- Benjamin Perley Poore, ed. (1879). Official Congressional Directory (2 ed.). Government Printing Office.

New York Times

- "Secretary Cox and Our Indian Policy" (PDF). New York Times. March 18, 1870. PDF
- "The President and Gen. Cox" (PDF). New York Times (PDF). November 10, 1870.
- "Secretary Cox and the Assessment of Clerks" (PDF). New York Times. October 10, 1870. PDF

Internet

- "Jacob Dolson Cox". Ohio Historical Society. Archived from the original on July 9, 2006.

Journals

- Cox, Jacob Dolson (August 1895). "How Judge Hoar Ceased To Be Attorney-General". Atlantic Monthly. 76. Boston.
- Hidalgo, Dennis (1997). "Charles Sumner and the Annexation of the Dominican Republic". Itinerario. 21 (2): 51–66. doi:10.1017/S0165115312000034. S2CID 162876421.
- Waltmann, Henry G. (Winter 1971). "Circumstantial Reformer: President Grant & the Indian Problem". Arizona and the West. 13 (4): 323–342. JSTOR 40168089.

Ohio Senate
Preceded by Robert Walker Tayler Sr.	Member of the Ohio Senate from the 23rd district 1860–1861	Succeeded by Samuel Quinby
Party political offices
Preceded by John Brough	Republican nominee for Governor of Ohio; 1865	Succeeded by Rutherford B. Hayes
Political offices
Preceded by Charles Anderson	Governor of Ohio; 1866–1868	Succeeded by Rutherford B. Hayes
Preceded by Orville Hickman Browning	United States Secretary of the Interior; 1869–1870	Succeeded by Columbus Delano
U.S. House of Representatives
Preceded by Frank H. Hurd	Member of the U.S. House of Representatives from Ohio's 6th congressional district 1877–1879	Succeeded by William D. Hill
