= 1863 Iowa gubernatorial election =

- October 13, 1863
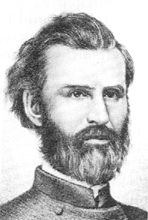

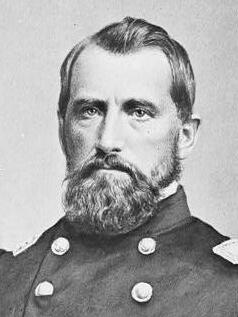
Nominee	William M. Stone	James M. Tuttle
Party	National Union	Democratic
Popular vote	86,118	56,169
Percentage	60.51%	39.47%
Governor before election
Samuel J. Kirkwood
Republican
Elected Governor
William M. Stone
National Union

The 1863 Iowa gubernatorial election was held on October 13, 1863, in order to elect the Governor of Iowa. National Union nominee William M. Stone defeated Democratic nominee James M. Tuttle.

== General election ==
1863 Iowa gubernatorial election
Party	Candidate	Votes	%
National Union	William M. Stone	86,107	60.54
Democratic	James M. Tuttle	56,132	39.46
Total votes		142,239	100.00
National Union hold			
