= Roger Averill =

American politician

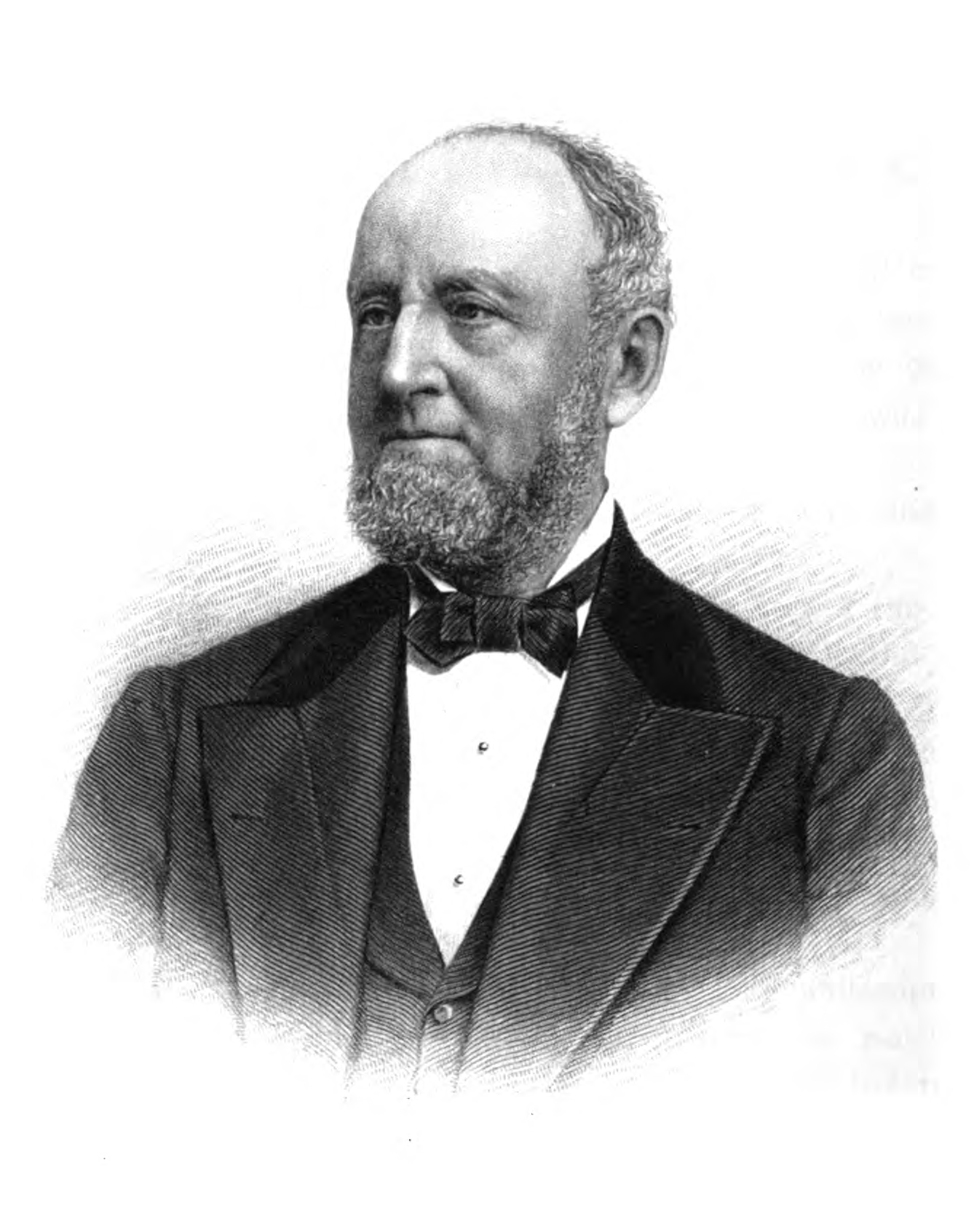
- Born: 14 August 1809; Salisbury
- Died: 9 December 1883 (aged 74); Danbury
- Occupation: Politician, lawyer
- Position held: Member of the Connecticut House of Representatives, Lieutenant Governor of Connecticut

Roger Averill (August 14, 1809 – December 9, 1883) was an American politician who was the 51st lieutenant governor of Connecticut.

== Early life ==
Roger Averill was born in Salisbury, Connecticut. Some of his ancestors were among the earliest European settlers of Connecticut. His grandfathers, Samuel Averill and John Whittlesey, were natives of Washington, Connecticut. His parents, Nathaniel P. Averill and Mary Whittlesey, moved to Salisbury in 1805. He was one of seven children reared on a small farm, and his education was mainly of his own earning. He went to the common school and used a public library and prepared for college under the guidance of his brother Chester, who was a professor at Union College, and he graduated from that college with honour in 1832. He studied law and was admitted to the bar in 1837. He opened his first practice in Salisbury, but attained a more successful practice after moving to Danbury in 1849.

He married Maria D. White, of Danbury, in October, 1844. Four of their children survived him and all of his sons also became lawyers.

== Political career ==
Roger Averill fulfilled many functions in public service, such as member of the Connecticut General Assembly. In the spring of 1861, he was a prominent leader of the Democratic party, which opposed the election of Abraham Lincoln for President. However, the instance that he heard the news of the assault of Fort Sumter, he hastened to raise his flag and refuse any compromise or surrender. From then on, he devoted himself to the success of the Union army. He was elected Lieutenant Governor of Connecticut along with Republicans on the Union ticket (called the "Union Party of Connecticut") in the spring of 1862 and continued in that function throughout the war, during the last four of the eight years in which William A. Buckingham was Governor of the state, until 1866. In both 1862 and 1863, the Republicans and Unionists had two separate conventions each year within days of each other, both of which would endorse the fusion Union tickets; in 1864 and 1865, they merged to form the National Union Party, which simply had one convention each year.

== Later years ==
Averill's wife Maria died in February 1860. In September 1861, he married Mary A. Perry, of Southport, who survived him.

After the time as lieutenant governor, Averill was one of the organizers of the American Bar Association, and was for many years acting chairman of the bar of his home county.

He died in Danbury, December 9, 1883, aged 74.

== See also ==
- List of governors of Connecticut
- National Union Party (United States)

Political offices
Preceded by Benjamin Douglas	Lieutenant Governor of Connecticut; 1862–1866	Succeeded by Oliver F. Winchester
