= 1864–65 United States Senate elections =

- January 8, 1864– December 28, 1865
- Class 2

38 (Note: 24 Class 2 seats, including concurrent special and regular elections in Maine; 12 special elections; and 2 new seats representing Nevada.) of the 72 (Note: 20 seats were vacant as a consequence of secession and Reconstruction.) seats in the United States Senate 37 (Note: Because 20 seats remained vacant during Reconstruction, the actual number needed for a majority was 27.) seats needed for a majority
	Majority party	Minority party
		Dem
Leader	Henry B. Anthony (Note: As chairman of the Senate Republican Conference.)	No formal leadership
Party	Union	Democratic
Alliance	Republican–Union	—
Leader's seat	Rhode Island	N/A
Seats before	36	9
Seats after	41	9 (Note: The remaining Unionists joined the Democratic Party at the beginning of the 39th Congress, increasing their caucus to 11 seats.)
Seat change	▲5	Steady
Seats up	11	4
Races won	16	4
	Third party
Party	Union
Seats before	5
Seats after	2 (Note: The remaining Unionists joined the Democratic Party at the beginning of the 39th Congress, dissolving their caucus.)
Seat change	▼3
Seats up	3
Races won	0
- Results: Democratic hold Democratic gain Union hold Union gain Republican hold Radical gain Conservative gain Not seated Unreconstructed states not holding elections

The 1864–65 United States Senate elections were held from January 8, 1864, to December 28, 1865. Regularly scheduled elections were held for 22 out of the 72 seats in the United States Senate, and Delaware, Maine, and Maryland held special elections. Nine former Confederate states held elections during presidential Reconstruction. The Republican–Union coalition increased its majority, flipping one Democratic-held seat and filling four new seats representing Nevada and Tennessee.

U.S. senators are divided into three classes with staggered six-year terms, such that one-third of the Senate is elected every two years. Senators in Class 2 were elected in 1864 and 1865. Prior to the ratification of the Seventeenth Amendment in 1913, senators were elected by the U.S. state legislatures. There was no fixed calendar, and states held elections on various dates preceding the first session of Congress. In states with split partisan control of the legislature, multiple rounds of voting could be required to elect a senator, leading to extended vacancies.

Republicans and Unionists held 41 seats following the 1862–63 United States Senate elections, which took place against the backdrop of the American Civil War. Thirty-six Republicans and Unionists formed the Republican–Union coalition at the beginning of the 38th United States Congress, while five Unionists from the border states caucused separately from the majority. The Union Party won a landslide victory in the 1864 United States elections, retaining control of the White House and expanding their majority in the United States House of Representatives. Following the assassination of Abraham Lincoln in 1865, Andrew Johnson succeeded Lincoln as president and attempted to implement his Reconstruction policy.

Republican–Unionists won the majority of races in the Union, flipping the Democratic-held seat in Illinois and replacing incumbents in Maine, Minnesota, New Hampshire, and Oregon. In Maryland, Unionist Thomas Holliday Hicks won the 1864 special election for the seat he had held since 1862; Hicks died early the following year and was succeeded by fellow Unionist John Creswell in a second special election. Democrats flipped one Union-held seat in New Jersey, but the winner was subsequently unseated due to election irregularities.

Alabama, Arkansas, Florida, Louisiana, Mississippi, North Carolina, South Carolina, Tennessee, and Virginia held elections following the end of the war. (Georgia and Texas failed to hold regularly-scheduled elections leading to the 39th United States Congress.) Unionists won both elections in Tennessee, sending Conservative David T. Patterson and Radical Joseph S. Fowler to the Senate. State suppression of the civil and political rights of freedpeople and Southern Unionists in the Southern United States led Congress to refuse to seat the remaining senators from the former Confederacy in December 1865. The exclusion of the Southern members contributed to conflict between Congress and Johnson's administration during the period of congressional Reconstruction.

== Results summary ==
Parties						Total
Parties	Democratic	Republican–Union	Union	Others	Vacant	Total
Last elections (1862–63)	10	33	4	3	20	70
Before these elections	9	36	5	—	20	70
Not up	5	25	2	—	2	34
Class 1 (1858–59→1868–69)	3	13	1	—	1	18
Class 3 (1860–61→1866–67)	2	12	1	—	1	16
Up	4	11	3	—	20	38
Class 2 (1858–59→1870–71)	3	11	1	—	9	24
Special: Class 1 & 3	1	—	2 (Note: Including the Maryland Class 3 seat. Maryland held two special elections for this seat in 1864 and 1865, due to the deaths of James Pearce and Thomas Holliday Hicks.)	—	9	12
Special: Class 2	—	1	—	—	2	3
New states	—	—	—	—	2 (Note: Kansas)	2
General election
1864	—	4	1	—	3	8
Held by same party	—	4	—	—	1	5
Replaced by other party	▼2 vacancies replaced by ▲2 Republican–Unionists ▼1 Unionist replaced by ▲1 vacancy					3
Result	—	6	—	—	2	8
1865	3	7	—	—	8	18
Held by same party	2	7	—	—	6	15
Replaced by other party	▼1 Democrat replaced by ▲1 Republican–Unionist ▼1 Republican–Unionist replaced by ▲1 Democrat ▼1 vacancy replaced by ▲1 Republican–Unionist					3
Result	3	8	—	—	7	18
Special elections
1864	1	—	2	—	4	7
Held by same party	1	—	—	—	4	5
Replaced by other party	▼1 Unionist replaced by ▲1 Republican–Unionist ▼1 Unionist replaced by ▲1 vacancy					2
Result	1	1	—	—	5	7
1865	—	2	—	—	7	9
Held by same party	—	2	—	—	6	8
Replaced by other party	▼1 vacancy replaced by ▲1 Republican–Unionist					1
Result	—	3	—	—	6	18
Result	9	41	2	0	20	72
Other changes	▲2	Steady	▼2	Steady	Steady	70

== Maps ==
Elections held in 1864

Elections held in 1865

== Change in Senate composition ==
Each block represents one of the 70 seats in the U.S. Senate. (The admission of Nevada on October 31, 1864, increased the number of seats in the Senate to 72.) "D_{#}" is a Democratic senator, "RU_{#}" is a Republican–Union senator, "U_{#}" is a Union senator, and "V_{#}" is a vacant seat. They are arranged so that the parties are separated, and a majority is clear by crossing the middle.

=== Before the elections ===
V_{5} Ala.	V_{4} Texas No election	V_{3} Ga. No election	V_{2}	V_{1}					
V_{6} Ala. (sp)	V_{7} Ark.	V_{8} Ark. (sp)	V_{9} Fla. (1-sp)	V_{10} Fla. (3-sp)	D_{1}	D_{2}	D_{3}	D_{4}	D_{5}
RU_{36} Ore. Retired	U_{5} Va. Retired	U_{4} Md. (sp) Ran	U_{3} Va. (sp) Died	U_{2}	U_{1}	D_{9} Ky. Retired	D_{8} Del. (sp) Resigned	D_{7} Ill. Ran	D_{6} Del. Ran
RU_{35} Maine Retired	RU_{34} W. Va. Ran	RU_{33} R.I. Ran	RU_{32} N.J. Ran	RU_{31} N.H. Ran	RU_{30} Minn. Ran	RU_{29} Mich. Ran	RU_{28} Mass. Ran	RU_{27} Kan. Ran	RU_{26} Iowa Ran
Majority →									RU_{25}
RU_{16}	RU_{17}	RU_{18}	RU_{19}	RU_{20}	RU_{21}	RU_{22}	RU_{23}	RU_{24}	RU_{25}
RU_{15}	RU_{14}	RU_{13}	RU_{12}	RU_{11}	RU_{10}	RU_{9}	RU_{8}	RU_{7}	RU_{6}
V_{16} N.C. (sp)	V_{17} S.C.	V_{18} S.C. (sp)	V_{19} Tenn.	V_{20} Tenn. (sp)	RU_{1}	RU_{2}	RU_{3}	RU_{4}	RU_{5}
V_{15} N.C.	V_{14} Miss. (sp)	V_{13} Miss.	V_{12} La. (sp)	V_{11} La.					

=== As a result of the elections ===
V_{6} Ark. (sp) Hold	V_{5} Ark. Hold	V_{4} Ala. (sp) Hold	V_{3} Ala. Hold	V_{2}	V_{1}				
V_{7} Fla. (1-sp) Hold	V_{8} Fla. (3-sp) Hold	V_{9} Ga. Hold	V_{10} La. Hold	D_{1}	D_{2}	D_{3}	D_{4}	D_{5}	D_{6} Del. Hold
RU_{37} Md. (sp) Gain (Note: Unionist interim appointee Thomas Holliday Hicks was re-elected as a Republican–Unionist in 1864. Hicks died in 1865 and was succeeded in the special election by Republican–Unionist John Creswell.)	RU_{38} Nev. Gain	RU_{39} Nev. Gain	RU_{40} Tenn. Gain	RU_{41} Tenn. (sp) Gain	U_{2}	U_{1}	D_{9} N.J. Gain	D_{8} Ky. Hold	D_{7} Del. (sp) Hold
RU_{36} Ill. Gain	RU_{35} Ore. Hold	RU_{34} N.H. Hold	RU_{33} Minn. Hold	RU_{32} Maine Hold (Note: Republican–Unionist interim appointee Nathan A. Farwell won the special election for this seat. Farwell did not seek re-election to the next term and was succeeded by Republican–Unionist William P. Fessenden.)	RU_{31} W. Va. Re-elected	RU_{30} R.I. Re-elected	RU_{29} Mich. Re-elected	RU_{28} Mass. Re-elected	RU_{27} Kan. Re-elected
Majority →									RU_{26} Iowa Re-elected
RU_{17}	RU_{18}	RU_{19}	RU_{20}	RU_{21}	RU_{22}	RU_{23}	RU_{24}	RU_{25}	RU_{26} Iowa Re-elected
RU_{16}	RU_{15}	RU_{14}	RU_{13}	RU_{12}	RU_{11}	RU_{10}	RU_{9}	RU_{8}	RU_{7}
V_{17} S.C. (sp) Hold	V_{18} Texas Hold	V_{19} Va. U Loss	V_{20} Va. (sp) U Loss	RU_{1}	RU_{2}	RU_{3}	RU_{4}	RU_{5}	RU_{6}
V_{16} S.C. Hold	V_{15} N.C. (sp) Hold	V_{14} N.C. Hold	V_{13} Miss. (sp) Hold	V_{12} Miss. Hold	V_{11} La. (sp) Hold				

=== Beginning of the first session ===
V_{6}	V_{5}	V_{4}	V_{3}	V_{2}	V_{1}				
V_{7}	V_{8}	V_{9}	V_{10}	D_{1}	D_{2}	D_{3}	D_{4}	D_{5}	D_{6}
RU_{36}	RU_{37}	RU_{38}	RU_{39}	RU_{40}	D_{11} Ky. Changed	D_{10} Md. Changed	D_{9}	D_{8}	D_{7}
RU_{35}	RU_{34}	RU_{33}	RU_{32}	RU_{31}	RU_{30}	RU_{29}	RU_{28}	RU_{27}	RU_{26}
Majority →									RU_{25}
RU_{16}	RU_{17}	RU_{18}	RU_{19}	RU_{20}	RU_{21}	RU_{22}	RU_{23}	RU_{24}	RU_{25}
RU_{15}	RU_{14}	RU_{13}	RU_{12}	RU_{11}	RU_{10}	RU_{9}	RU_{8}	RU_{7}	RU_{6}
V_{17}	V_{18}	V_{19}	V_{20}	V_{21} Iowa Resigned	RU_{1}	RU_{2}	RU_{3}	RU_{4}	RU_{5}
V_{16}	V_{15}	V_{14}	V_{13}	V_{12}	V_{11}				

Key:

D_{#}	Democratic
RU_{#}	Republican–Union
U_{#}	Union
V_{#}	Vacant

== Race summaries ==
=== Elections during the preceding Congress ===
Special elections were held to fill vacancies in the 38th United States Congress and two new seats created by the admission of Nevada.

State	Incumbent			This race	
State	Senator	Party	Electoral history	Results	Candidates
Maryland (Class 3)	Thomas Holliday Hicks	Union (Note: Caucused separately from the Republican–Union majority coalition.)	1862 (ap.) (Note: Hicks served as a non-aligned "Conditional" Unionist before his election and afterwards caucused with the Republican–Union majority.)	Interim appointee elected as a Unionist January 11, 1864. Union gain.	First ballot (January 8, 1864): ▌ ✓ Thomas Holliday Hicks (Union) 67; ▌ Samuel Hambleton (Democratic) 18; ▌ Thomas A. Spence (Union) 2; Blank 4
Delaware (Class 1)	James A. Bayard Jr.	Democratic	1851; 1857; 1863	Incumbent resigned January 29, 1864. New senator elected January 29, 1864. Democratic hold.	First ballot (January 29, 1864): ▌ ✓ George R. Riddle (Democratic) 18; Blank 8
Arkansas (Class 3)	Vacant			Seat vacant since July 11, 1861. Winner not seated.	Fourth ballot (May 2, 1864): ▌ ✓ Elisha Baxter (Unknown) 38; ▌William M. Fishback (Unknown) 34; ▌Jesse Shortis (Unknown) 2
Arkansas (Class 2)	Vacant			Seat vacant since July 11, 1861. Winner not seated.	Twenty-first ballot (May 5, 1864): ▌ ✓ William M. Fishback (Unknown) 41; ▌William D. Snow (Unknown) 16; ▌Solomon Clark (Unknown) 5; ▌L. C. White (Unknown) 5; ▌William J. Patton (Unknown) 4; Scattering 2
Louisiana (Class 3)	Vacant			Seat vacant since February 4, 1861. Winner not seated.	First ballot (October 10, 1864): ▌ ✓ R. King Cutler (Free State) 77; ▌Cuthbert Bullitt (Conservative) 20; ▌Edward H. Durell (Free State) 7
Louisiana (Class 2)	Vacant			Seat vacant since March 14, 1861. Winner not seated.	First ballot (October 10, 1864): ▌ ✓ Charles Smith (Free State) 62; ▌Cuthbert Bullitt (Conservative) 35; ▌Edward H. Durell (Free State) 7
Nevada 2 seats	None (new state)			Seat created October 31, 1864. Union gain.	First ballot (December 15, 1864): ▌ ✓ William M. Stewart (Union) 33; ▌James W. Nye (Union) 23; ▌Charles E. DeLong (Union) 23; ▌Bernard C. Whitman (Union) 13; ▌John Cradlebaugh (Independent Union) 12
Nevada 2 seats	None (new state)			Seat created October 31, 1864. Union gain.	Ninth ballot (December 16, 1864): ▌ ✓ James W. Nye (Union) 29; ▌Charles E. DeLong (Union) 16; ▌John Cradlebaugh (Independent Union) 7
Virginia (Class 1)	Lemuel J. Bowden	Union	1863	Incumbent died January 2, 1864. Winner not seated. Union loss.	First ballot (December 8, 1864): ▌ ✓ Joseph Segar (Union) 11; ▌John C. Underwood (Union) 3; ▌S. Ferguson Beach (Union) 1; ▌Lewis McKenzie (Union) 1
Maine (Class 2)	Nathan A. Farwell	Union	1864 (ap.)	Appointee re-elected.	First ballot (January 11, 1865): ▌ ✓ Nathan A. Farwell (Union) 118 H; 27 S; ▌William P. Haines (Democratic) 21 H; 0 S

=== Elections leading to the next Congress ===
These senators were elected for the term beginning March 4, 1865.

State	Incumbent			This race	
State	Senator	Party	Electoral history	Results	Candidates
Alabama	Vacant			Seat vacant since March 14, 1861. Winner not seated.	First ballot (November 28, 1865): ▌ ✓ Lewis E. Parsons (Unknown) 116; Scattering 4
Arkansas	Vacant			Seat vacant since July 11, 1861. Winner not seated.	Third ballot (December 30, 1864): ▌ ✓ William D. Snow (Unknown) 35; ▌Orville Jennings (Unknown) 23; Scattering 2
Delaware	Willard Saulsbury Sr.	Democratic	1858	Incumbent re-elected.	First ballot (January 24, 1865): ▌ ✓ Willard Saulsbury (Democratic) 19; ▌Edward G. Bradford (Union) 10
Georgia	Vacant			Seat vacant since March 14, 1861. No election.	None.
Illinois	William Alexander Richardson	Democratic	1863 (sp.)	Incumbent retired. Union gain.	First ballot (January 4, 1865): ▌ ✓ Richard Yates (Union) 64; ▌James C. Robinson (Democratic) 43
Iowa	James W. Grimes	Republican	1858	Incumbent re-elected.	First ballot (January 16, 1864): ▌ ✓ James W. Grimes (Republican) 128; ▌John D. Jennings (Democratic) 5; ▌James M. Love (Democratic) 1
Kansas	Jim Lane	Republican	1861	Incumbent re-elected.	First ballot (January 12, 1865): ▌ ✓ Jim Lane (Republican) 82; ▌William A. Phillips (Republican) 7; ▌William C. McDowell (Democratic) 4; ▌Claudius B. Brace (Unknown) 2; ▌William Y. Roberts (Republican) 2; ▌B. M. Hughes (Unknown) 1
Kentucky	Lazarus W. Powell	Democratic	1858	Incumbent retired. Democratic hold.	First ballot (January 11, 1865): ▌ ✓ James Guthrie (Democratic) 65; ▌Lovell Rousseau (Unconditional Union) 56; ▌John B. Huston (Democratic) 3; ▌William O. Butler (Democratic) 2; ▌Landaff Andrews (Unknown) 1
Louisiana	Vacant			Seat vacant since February 4, 1861. Winner not seated.	First ballot (January 9, 1865): ▌ ✓ Michael Hahn (Free State Republican) 92; ▌Charles Smith (Free State Republican) 2
Maine	Nathan A. Farwell	Union	1864 (ap.); 1865 (sp.)	Incumbent retired. Union hold.	First ballot (January 11, 1865): ▌ ✓ William P. Fessenden (Union) 116 H; 27 S; ▌William P. Haines (Democratic) 23 H; 0 S
Massachusetts	Henry Wilson	Republican	1855 (sp.); 1859	Incumbent re-elected.	First ballot (January 10 & 20, 1865): ▌ ✓ Henry Wilson (Republican) 207 H; 37 S; ▌John A. Andrew (Republican) 12 H; 3 S; ▌Robert C. Winthrop (Democratic) 4 H; 0 S; ▌Alexander Bullock (Republican) 1 H; 0 S; ▌Charles G. Loring (Unknown) 1 H; 0 S
Michigan	Jacob M. Howard	Republican	1862 (sp.)	Incumbent re-elected.	First ballot (January 5, 1865): ▌ ✓ Jacob M. Howard (Republican) 70 H; 27 S; ▌George V. N. Lothrop (Democratic) 27 H; 3 S
Minnesota	Morton S. Wilkinson	Republican	1859	Incumbent lost renomination. Union gain.	First ballot (January 10, 1865): ▌ ✓ Daniel S. Norton (Union) 46; ▌James George (Democratic) 13
Mississippi	Vacant			Seat vacant since March 14, 1861. Winner not seated.	Fourth ballot (October 20, 1865): ▌ ✓ James L. Alcorn (Whig) 74; ▌Samuel J. Gholson (Democratic) 33; ▌William Yerger (Whig) 19
New Hampshire	John P. Hale	Republican	1846; 1853 (ret.); 1855 (sp.); 1859	Incumbent lost re-nomination. Republican hold.	First ballot (June 15, 1864): ▌ ✓ Aaron H. Cragin (Republican) 201 H; 8 S; ▌John H. George (Democratic) 113 H; 3 S; ▌Gilman Marston (Republican) 4 H; 0 S; ▌Ira Allen Eastman (Unknown) 1 H; 0 S
New Jersey	John C. Ten Eyck	Union	1858 (Note: Ten Eyck was elected as an Oppositionist in 1858 and became a Unionist in 1862.)	Incumbent lost re-election. Democratic gain. Winner later unseated.	First ballot (March 15, 1865): ▌ ✓ John P. Stockton (Democratic) 40; ▌John C. Ten Eyck (Union) 37; Scattering 4
North Carolina	Vacant			Seat vacant since July 11, 1861. Winner not seated.	First ballot (December 5, 1865): ▌ ✓ William Alexander Graham (Unknown) 138; ▌Nathaniel Boyden (Unknown) 8; ▌Robert P. Dick (Unknown) 7; ▌Bedford Brown (Unknown) 1
Oregon	Benjamin F. Harding	Union	1862 (sp.)	Incumbent retired. Union hold.	Third ballot (September 15, 1864): ▌ ✓ George Henry Williams (Union) 31; ▌Thomas H. Pearne (Union) 16; ▌John F. Miller (Democratic) 6; ▌W. H. Watkins (Union) 2
Rhode Island	Henry B. Anthony	Union	1858 (Note: Anthony was elected as a Republican and became a Unionist in 1864.)	Incumbent re-elected.	First ballot (June 1, 1864): ▌ ✓ Henry B. Anthony (Union) 75; ▌George H. Browne (Democratic) 27; Scattering 2
South Carolina	Vacant			Seat vacant since July 11, 1861. Winner not seated.	First ballot (October 30, 1865): ▌ ✓ Benjamin Franklin Perry (Unknown) 109; ▌John Lawrence Manning (Unknown) 24
Tennessee	Vacant			Seat vacant since July 11, 1861. Radical gain.	Fourth ballot (May 4, 1865): ▌ ✓ Joseph S. Fowler (Radical) 49; ▌William H. Wisener (Radical) 28; ▌Return J. Meigs III (Unknown) 12; ▌J. B. Rodgers (Unknown) 2
Texas	Vacant			Seat vacant since July 11, 1861. No election.	None.
Virginia	John S. Carlile	Union	1861 (sp.) (Note: Carlisle was elected as a Unionist and became a Democrat before the end of his term on March 4, 1865.)	Incumbent retired. Winner not seated. Union loss.	First ballot (December 9, 1864): ▌ ✓ John C. Underwood (Union) 12; ▌S. Ferguson Beach (Union) 2; ▌Lewis McKenzie (Union) 2
West Virginia	Waitman T. Willey	Union	1863 (Note: Willey was elected as a border state unionist and joined the Republican–Union coalition in 1864.)	Incumbent re-elected.	First ballot (January 31, 1865): ▌ ✓ Waitman T. Willey (Union) 53; ▌Lee Roy Kramer (Union) 7; ▌Daniel Polsley (Unknown) 6; ▌Archibald Campbell (Unknown) 2; ▌David Hunter Strother (Unknown) 1

=== Special elections during the next Congress ===
State	Incumbent			This race	
State	Senator	Party	Electoral history	Results	Candidates
Maryland (Class 3)	Vacant			Incumbent died February 14, 1865. Union hold.	First ballot (March 9, 1865): ▌ ✓ John Creswell (Union) 63; ▌Cathrill Humphries (Unknown) 2; ▌James E. Pilkington (Unknown) 2; ▌A. J. Willis (Unknown) 1; Blank 25
Tennessee (Class 1)	Vacant			Seat vacant since March 4, 1862. Conservative gain.	Fifth ballot (May 4, 1865): ▌ ✓ David T. Patterson (Conservative) 52; ▌Horace Maynard (Radical) 38; ▌Nathaniel Green Taylor (Conservative) 1
Mississippi (Class 1)	Vacant			Seat vacant since March 14, 1861. Winner not seated.	First ballot (October 19, 1865): ▌ ✓ William L. Sharkey (Whig) 100; ▌Fulton Anderson (Whig) 26
South Carolina (Class 3)	Vacant			Seat vacant since November 11, 1860. Winner not seated.	Third ballot (November 1, 1865): ▌ ✓ John Lawrence Manning (Unknown) 95; ▌T. N. Dawkins (Unknown) 50
Alabama (Class 3)	Vacant			Seat vacant since January 21, 1861. Winner not seated.	Fourth ballot (November 28, 1865): ▌ ✓ George S. Houston (Unknown) 64; ▌John Forsyth Jr. (Unknown) 28; ▌A. B. Cooper (Unknown) 18; ▌Thomas H. Watts (Unknown) 17
North Carolina (Class 3)	Vacant			Seat vacant since July 11, 1861. Winner not seated.	Second ballot (December 4, 1865: ▌ ✓ John Pool (Unknown) 93; ▌Thomas Samuel Ashe (Unknown) 60; ▌William N. H. Smith (Unknown) 9; ▌Nathaniel Boyden (Unknown) 1
Florida (Class 1)	Vacant			Seat vacant since March 14, 1861. Winner not seated.	First ballot (December 28, 1865): ▌ ✓ Wilkinson Call (Unknown) 51; ▌James Patton Anderson (Unknown) 21; Blank 4
Florida (Class 3)	Vacant			Seat vacant since January 21, 1861. Winner not seated.	Ninth ballot (December 28, 1865): ▌ ✓ William Marvin (Unknown) 49; ▌Jesse J. Finley (Unknown) 24; Blank 3

== Alabama ==
Alabama held two elections due to the withdrawal of its senators during the Civil War. The winners were not seated by the Senate.

=== Alabama (regular) ===
Alabama election
- November 28, 1865

Members of the Alabama Legislature Majority of voting members needed to win
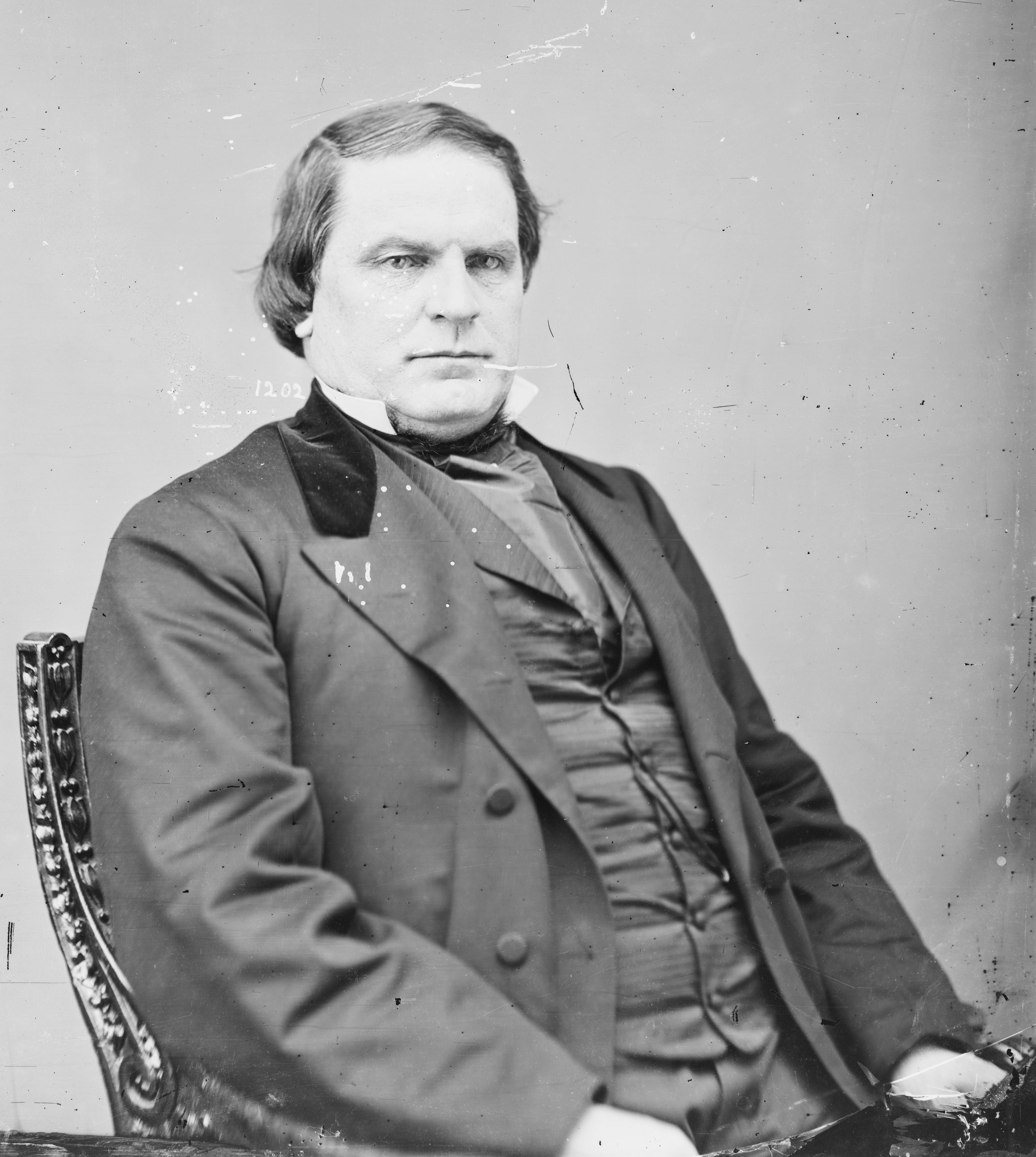

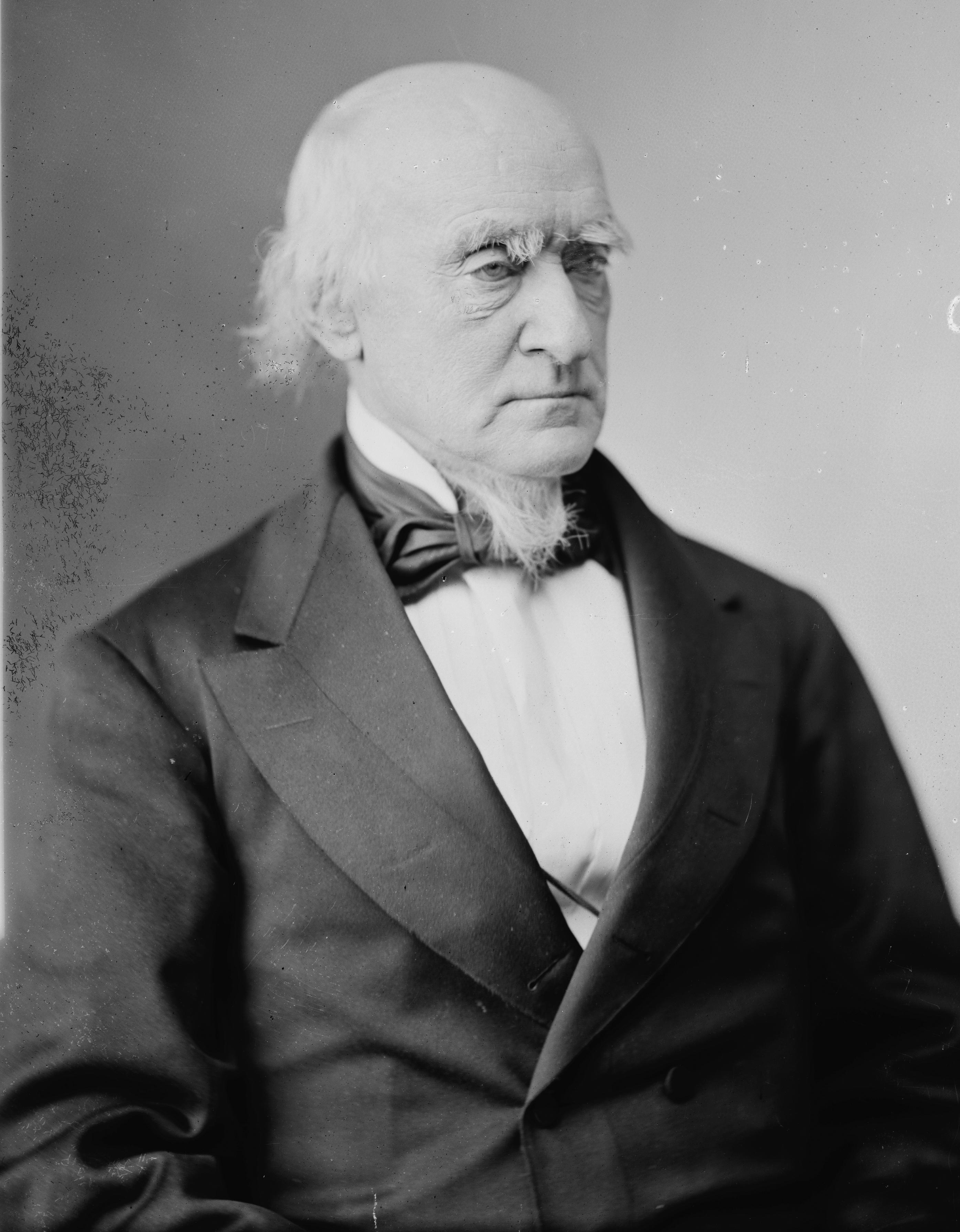

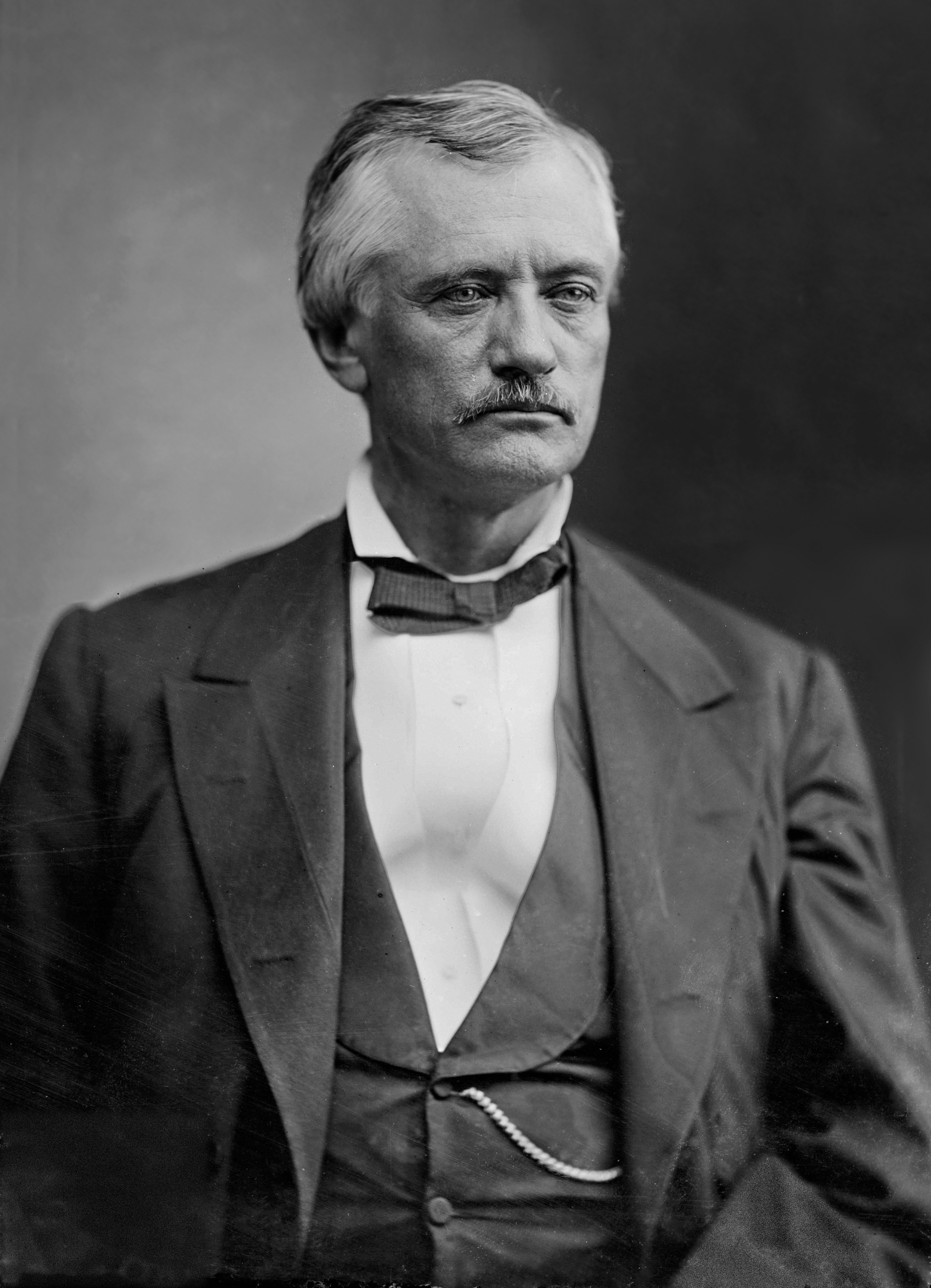

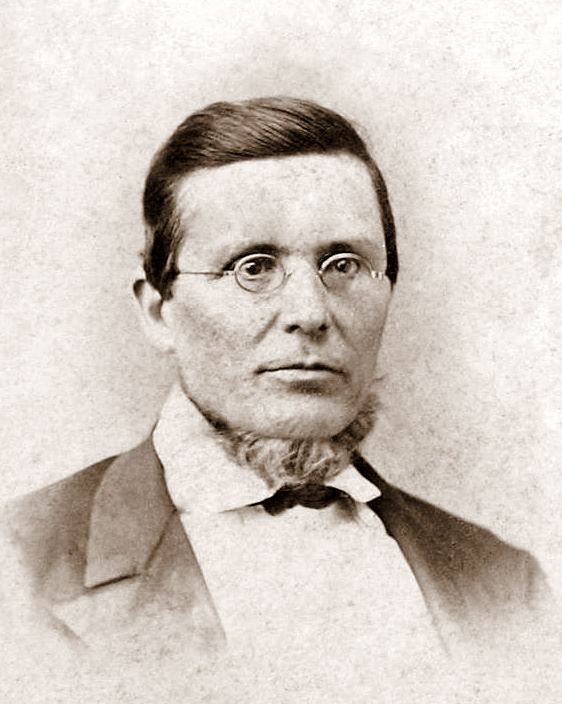
Nominee	Lewis E. Parsons	John Archibald Campbell	John T. Morgan
1st ballot	116 (96.7%)	1 (0.8%)	1 (0.8%)
Nominee	F. W. Sykes	Thomas H. Watts
1st ballot	1 (0.8%)	1 (0.8%)
Senator before election
None (vacant from March 14, 1861)
Elected Senator
Lewis E. Parsons (not seated)

Two-term Democrat Clement Claiborne Clay withdrew from the Senate on March 14, 1861, following the secession of Alabama.

The Alabama Legislature met on November 28, 1865, to hold an election for the next term. Lewis E. Parsons defeated four other candidates on the first ballot.

=== Alabama (special) ===
Alabama special election
- November 28, 1865

Members of the Alabama Legislature Majority of voting members needed to win
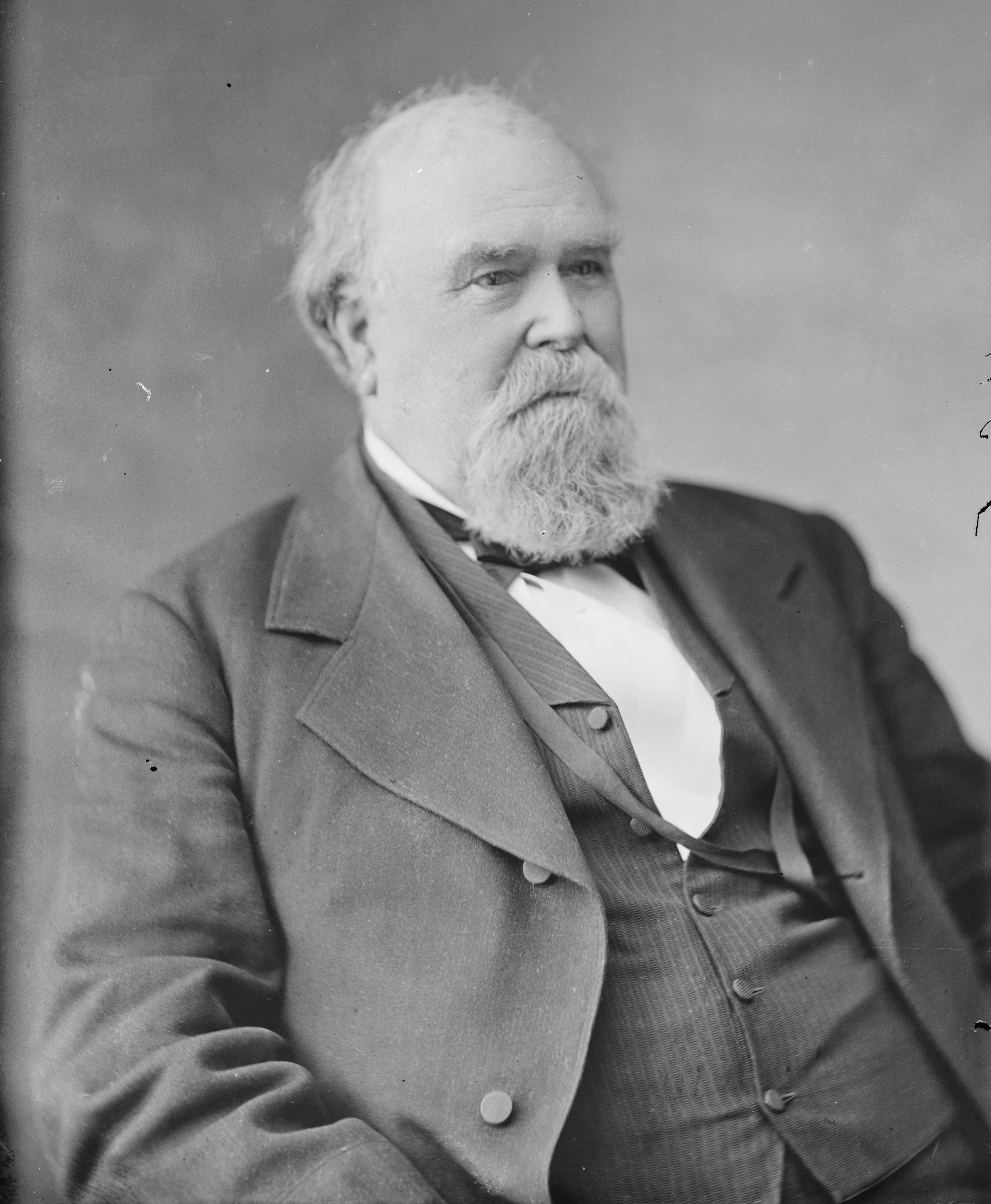

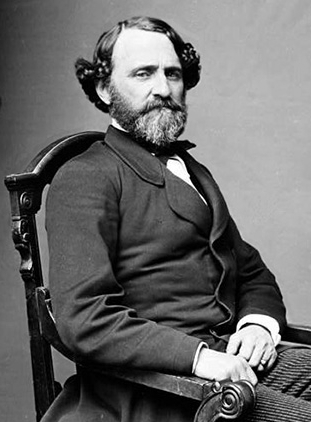

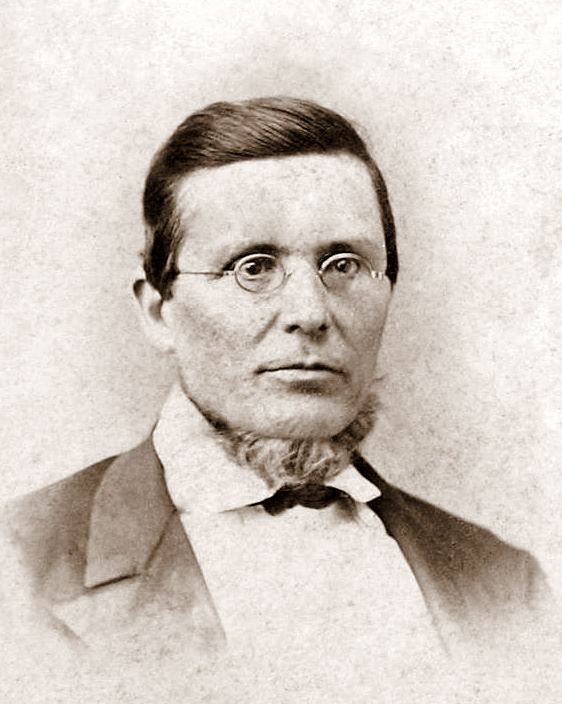
Nominee	George S. Houston	John Forsyth Jr.
1st ballot	61 (47.3%)	34 (26.4%)
4th ballot	64 (50.4%)	28 (22.0%)
Nominee	A. B. Cooper	Thomas H. Watts
1st ballot	34 (26.4%)	—
4th ballot	18 (14.2%)	17 (13.4%)
Senator before election
None (vacant from January 21, 1861)
Elected Senator
George S. Houston (not seated)

Two-term Democrat Benjamin Fitzpatrick withdrew from the Senate on January 21, 1861, following the secession of Alabama.

The Alabama Legislature met on November 28, 1865, to hold a special election for the unexpired term. George S. Houston defeated John Forsyth Jr. on the fourth ballot.

== Arkansas ==
Arkansas held two special elections, in addition to the regular election for the Class 2 seat, due to the expulsion of the state's senators during the Civil War. The winners were not seated by the Senate.

=== Arkansas (Class 3 special) ===
Arkansas special election (Class 3)
- May 2, 1864

Members of the Arkansas General Assembly Majority of voting members needed to win
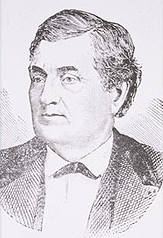

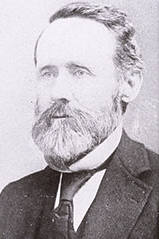

Nominee	Elisha Baxter	William Meade Fishback	Horace Bull Allis
1st ballot	17 (23.3%)	29 (39.7%)	7 (9.6%)
4th ballot	38 (51.4%)	34 (45.9%)	—
Nominee	William D. Snow	John Kirkwood
1st ballot	5 (6.8%)	4 (5.5%)
4th ballot	—	—
Senator before election
None (vacant from July 11, 1861)
Elected Senator
Elisha Baxter (not seated)

One-term Democrat Charles B. Mitchel was expelled from the Senate on July 11, 1861.

The Arkansas General Assembly met on May 2, 1864, to hold a special election for the unexpired term. Elisha Baxter defeated William Meade Fishback on the fourth ballot.

=== Arkansas (Class 2 special) ===
Arkansas special election (Class 2)
- May 3–5, 1864

Members of the Arkansas General Assembly Majority of voting members needed to win
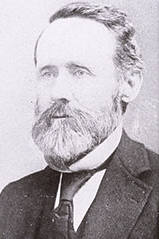

Nominee	William Meade Fishback	William D. Snow	Solomon Clark
21st ballot	41 (56.2%)	16 (21.9%)	5 (6.8%)
Nominee	L. C. White	William J. Patton
21st ballot	5 (6.8%)	4 (5.5%)
Senator before election
None (vacant from July 11, 1861)
Elected Senator
William Meade Fishback (not seated)

Three-term Democrat William K. Sebastian was expelled from the Senate on July 11, 1861.

The Arkansas General Assembly met from May 3–5, 1864, to hold a special election for the unexpired term. William Meade Fishback defeated William D. Snow on the 21st ballot.

=== Arkansas (regular) ===
Arkansas election
- December 30, 1864

Members of the Arkansas General Assembly Majority of voting members needed to win

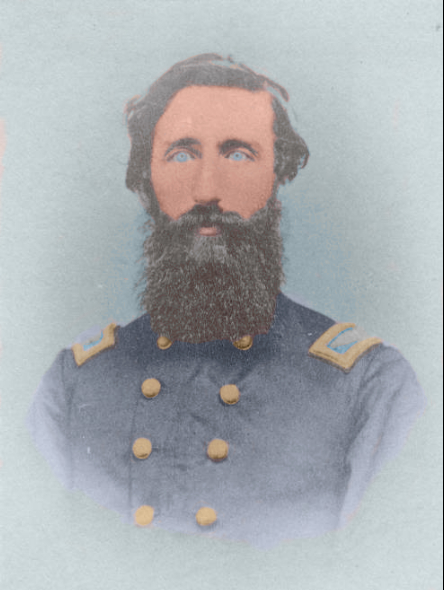

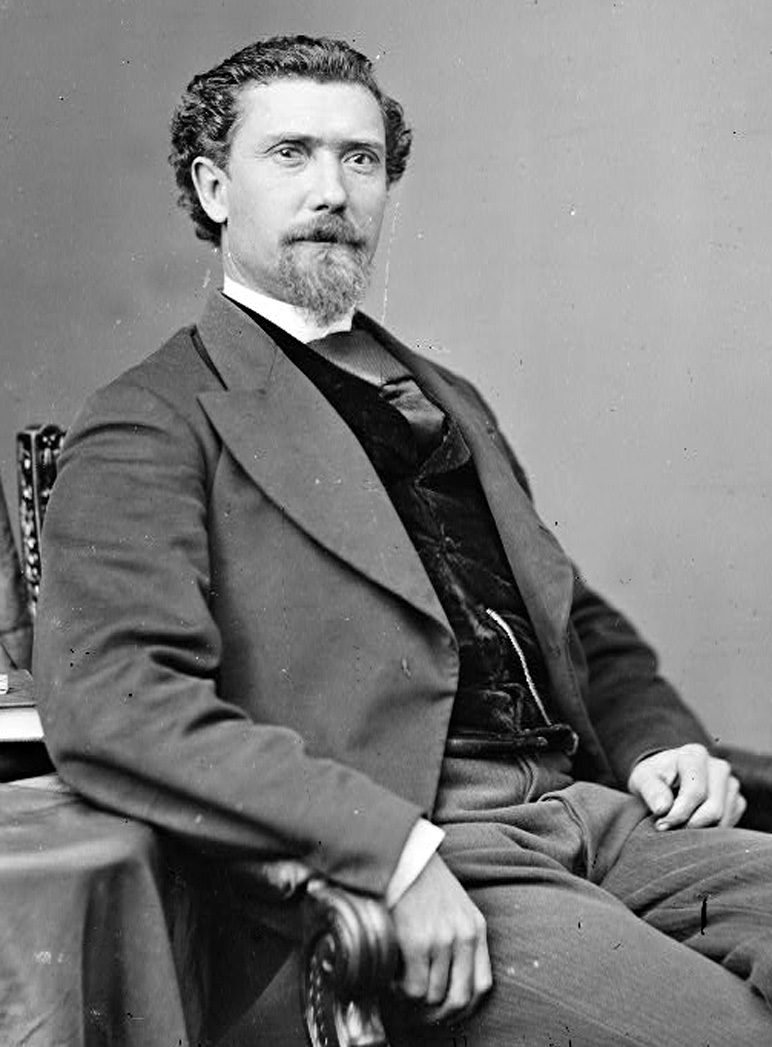

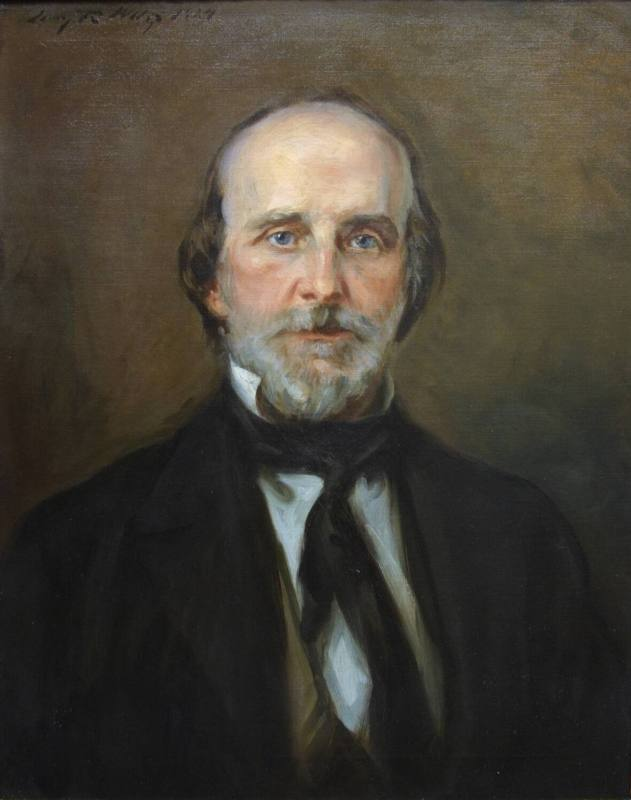
Nominee	William D. Snow	Orville Jennings	John Kirkwood
1st ballot	21 (35.0%)	10 (16.7%)	11 (18.3%)
3rd ballot	35 (58.3%)	23 (38.3%)	—
Nominee	James M. Johnson	Oliver P. Snyder	Isaac Murphy
1st ballot	8 (13.3%)	6 (10.0%)	3 (5.0%)
3rd ballot	—	—	—
Senator before election
None (vacant from July 11, 1861)
Elected Senator
William Meade Fishback (not seated)

William Meade Fishback was elected in 1864, but was not seated by the Senate.

The Arkansas General Assembly met on December 30, 1864, to hold an election for the next term. William D. Snow defeated Orville Jennings on the third ballot.

== Delaware ==
Two elections were held in Delaware, due to the resignation of James A. Bayard, Jr.

=== Delaware (special) ===
Delaware special election
- January 29, 1864

Members of the Delaware General Assembly Majority of voting members needed to win
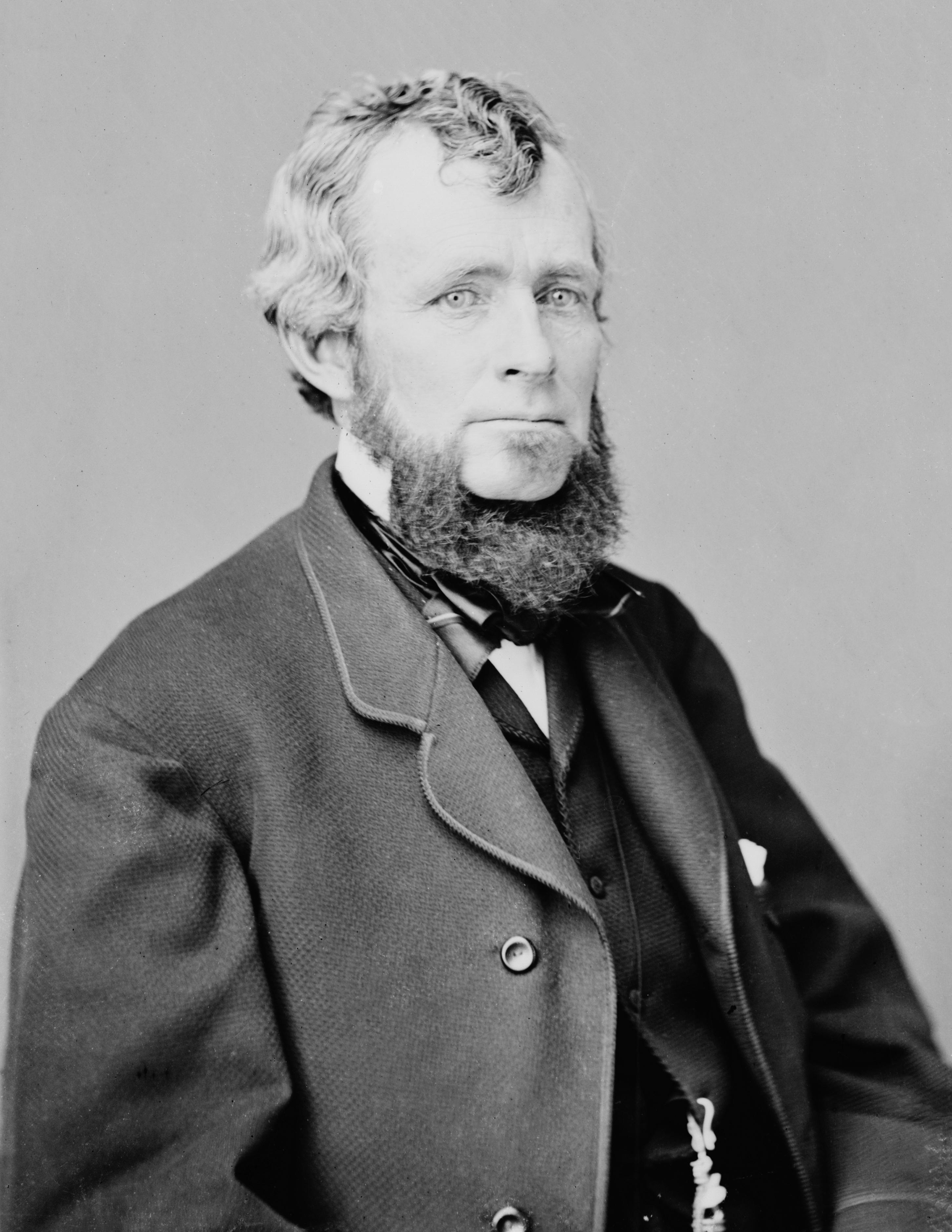

Nominee	George R. Riddle	Blank
Party	Democratic
1st ballot	18 (69.2%)	8 (30.8%)
Senator before election
James A. Bayard Jr.
Democratic
Elected Senator
George R. Riddle
Democratic

Three-term Democrat James A. Bayard Jr. resigned on January 29, 1864.

The Delaware General Assembly met on January 29, 1864, to hold a special election for the unexpired term. Democratic candidate George R. Riddle was elected on the first ballot. The Union members of the legislature cast blank ballots.

=== Delaware (regular) ===
Delaware election
- January 24, 1865

Members of the Delaware General Assembly Majority of voting members needed to win
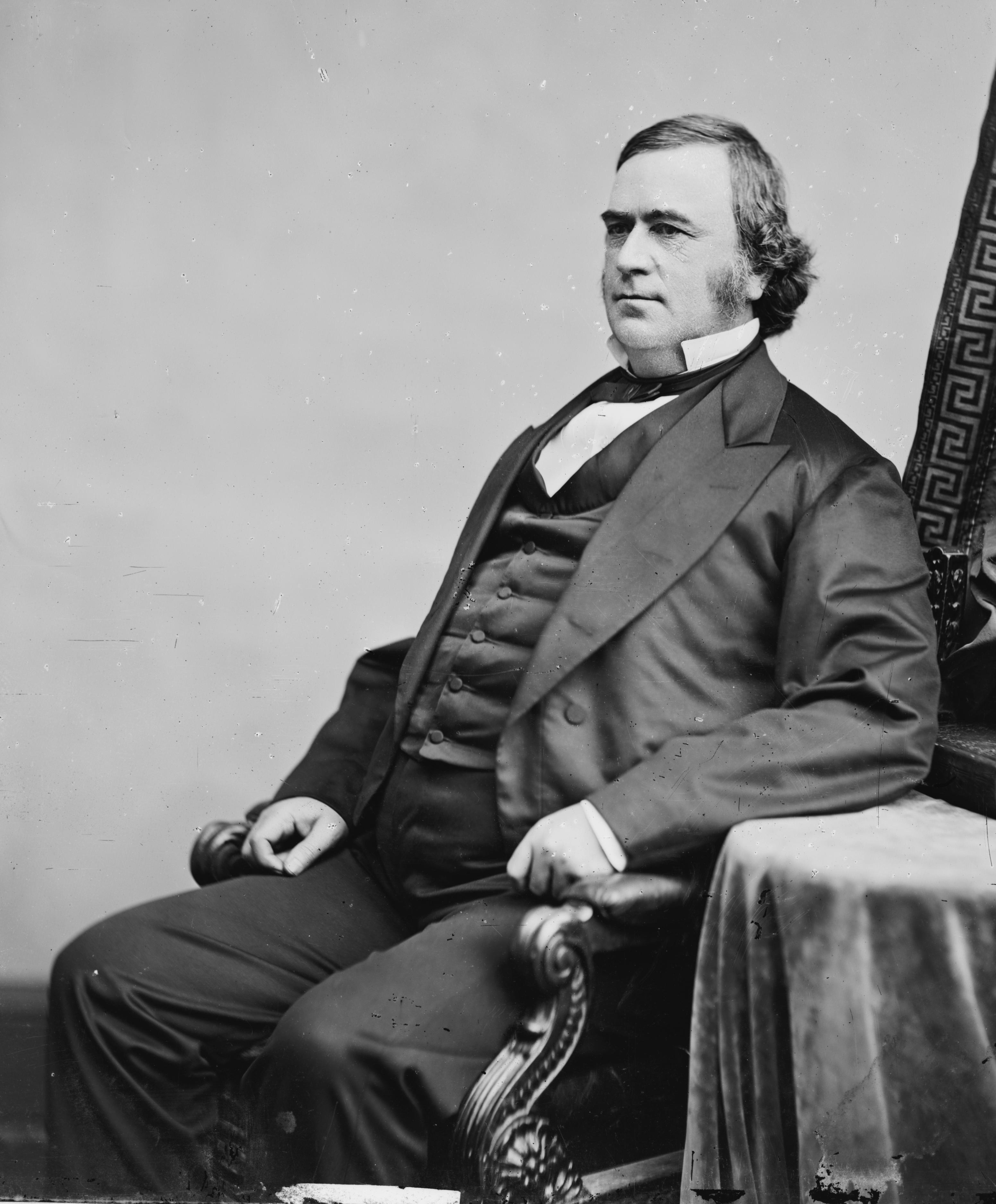

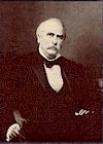
Nominee	Willard Saulsbury Sr.	Edward Green Bradford
Party	Democratic	Union
1st ballot	19 (65.5%)	10 (34.5%)
Senator before election
Willard Saulsbury Sr.
Democratic
Elected Senator
Willard Saulsbury Sr.
Democratic

One-term Democrat Willard Saulsbury Sr. was elected in 1858.

The Delaware General Assembly met on January 24, 1865, to hold an election for the next term. Saulsbury defeated Union candidate Edward Green Bradford on the first ballot.

== Florida (specials) ==
Florida held two special elections due to the withdrawal of its senators during the Civil War. The winners were not seated by the Senate.

=== Florida (Class 1 special) ===
Florida special election (Class 1)
- December 28, 1865

Members of the Florida Legislature Majority of voting members needed to win
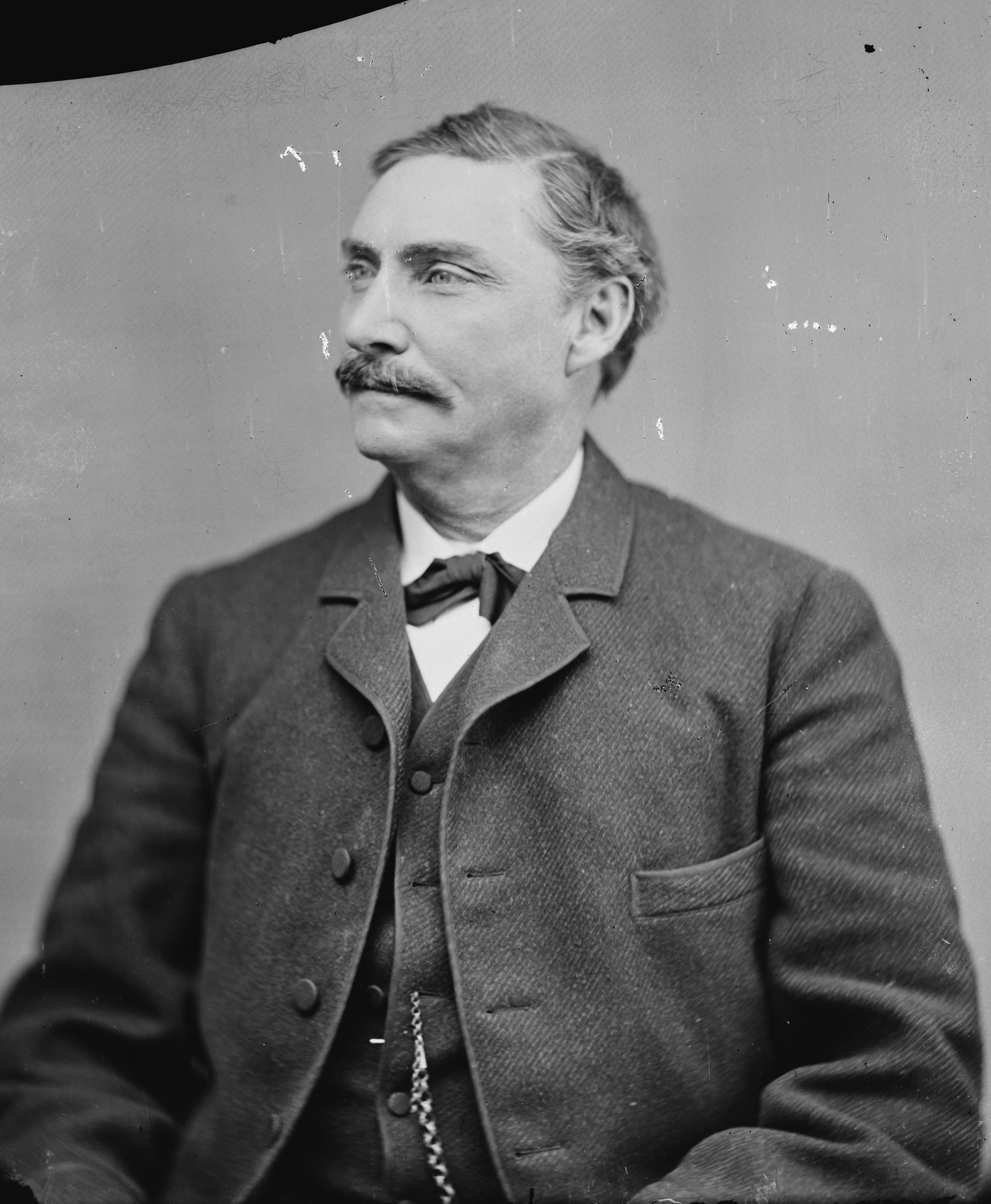

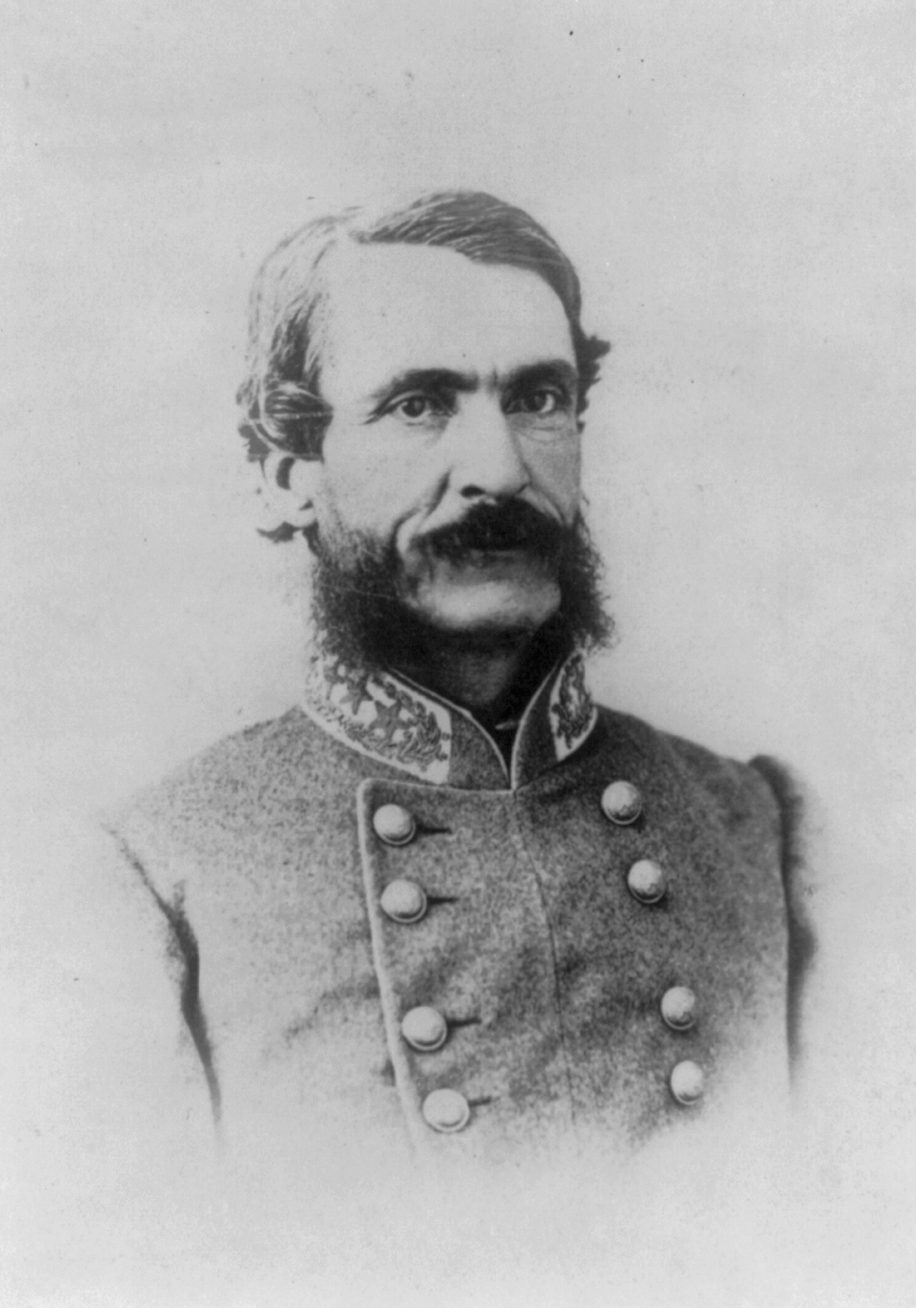
Nominee	Wilkinson Call	James Patton Anderson
1st ballot	51 (67.1%)	21 (27.6%)
Senator before election
None (vacant from March 14, 1861)
Elected Senator
Wilkinson Call (not seated)

Two-term Democrat Stephen Mallory withdrew from the Senate on March 14, 1861, following the secession of Florida.

The Florida Legislature met on December 29, 1865, to hold a special election for the unexpired term. Wilkinson Call defeated James Patton Anderson on the first ballot.

=== Florida (Class 3 special) ===
Florida special election (Class 3)
- December 28, 1865

Members of the Florida Legislature Majority of voting members needed to win
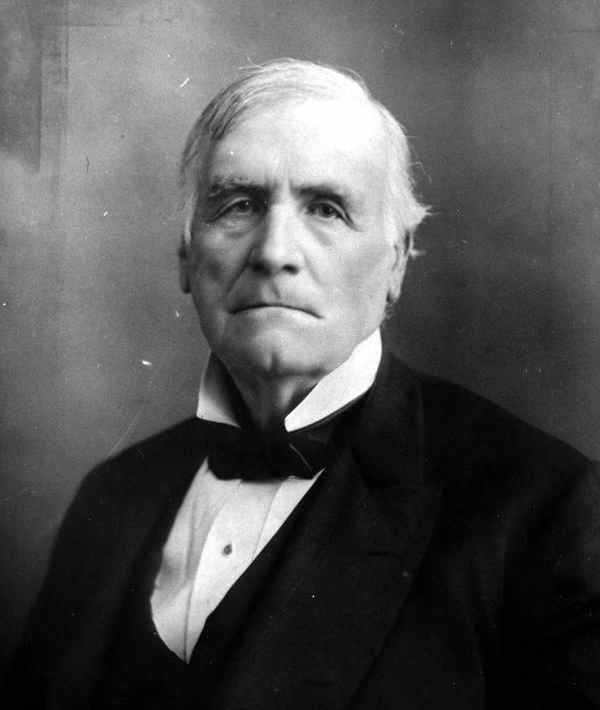

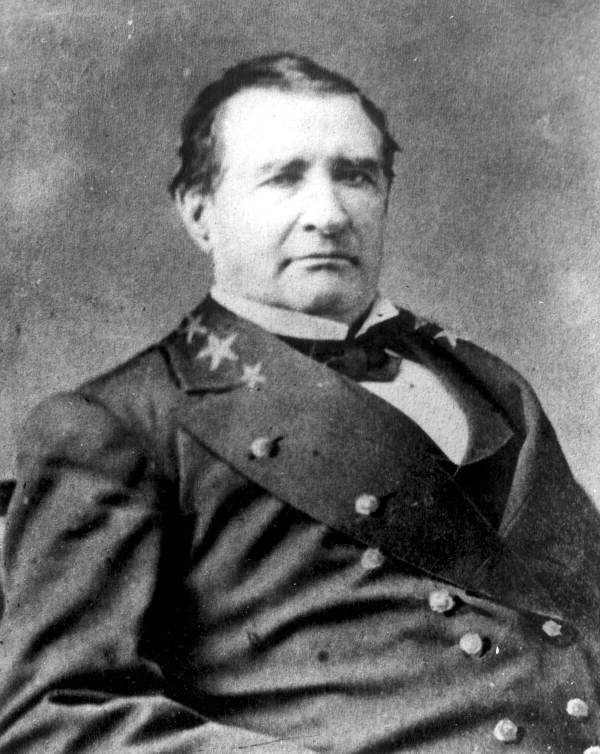

Nominee	William Marvin	Jesse J. Finley	B. D. White
1st ballot	21 (28.4%)	10 (13.5%)	23 (31.1%)
9th ballot	49 (64.5%)	24 (32.4%)	—
Nominee	Edward Hopkins	James A. Wiggins
1st ballot	13 (17.6%)	7 (9.4%)
9th ballot	—	—
Senator before election
None (vacant from January 21, 1861)
Elected Senator
William Marvin (not seated)

One-term Democrat David Levy Yulee withdrew from the Senate on January 21, 1861, following the secession of Florida.

The Florida Legislature met on December 29, 1865, to hold a special election for the unexpired term. William Marvin defeated Jesse J. Finley on the ninth ballot.

== Georgia ==
Georgia election
- No election
Senator before election
None (vacant from March 14, 1861)
Elected Senator
None

Two-term Democrat Robert Toombs withdrew from the Senate on March 14, 1861, following the secession of Georgia. The Georgia General Assembly did not hold an election for the next term, and the seat remained vacant until 1871.

== Illinois ==
Illinois election
- January 4, 1865

Members of the Illinois General Assembly Majority of voting members needed to win
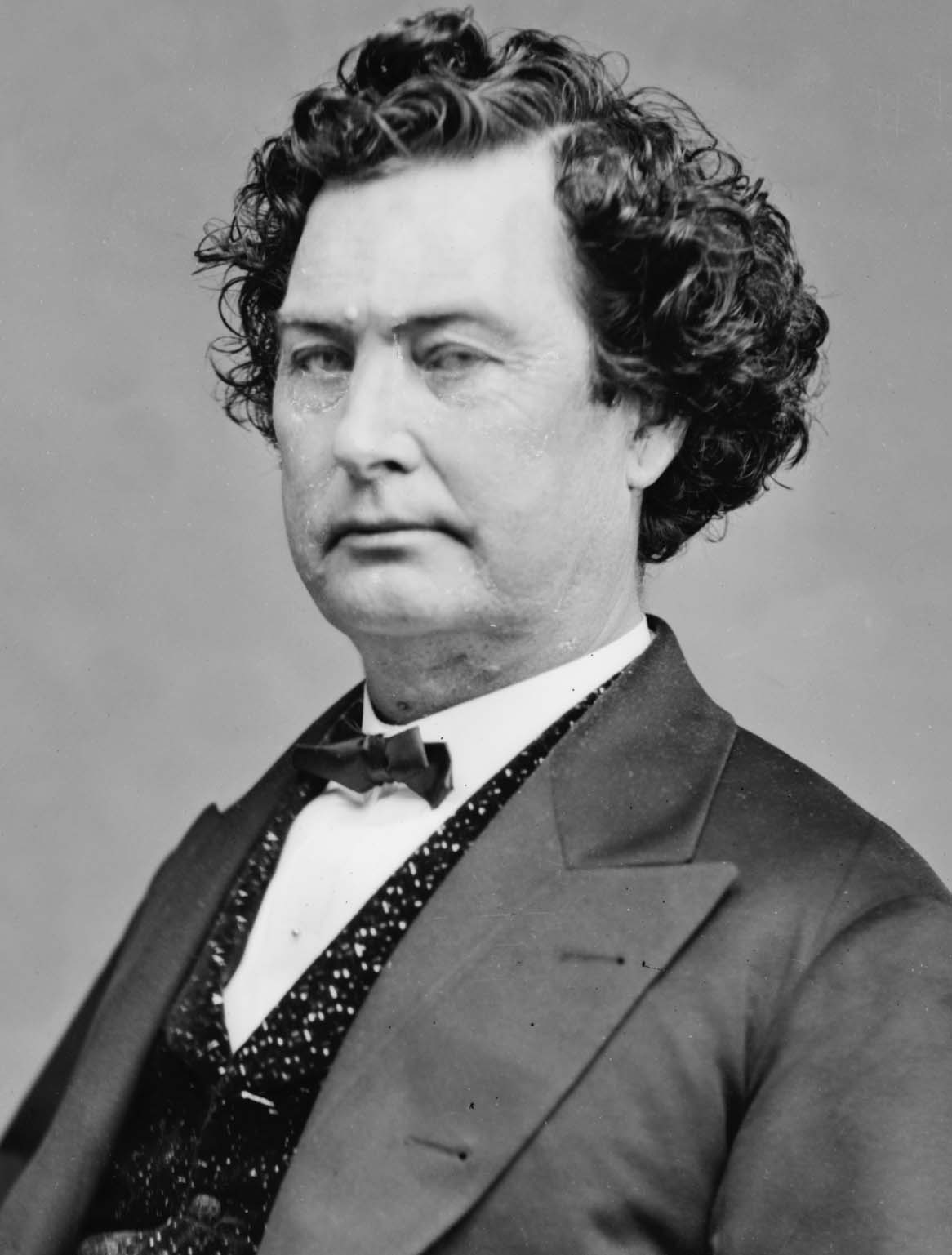

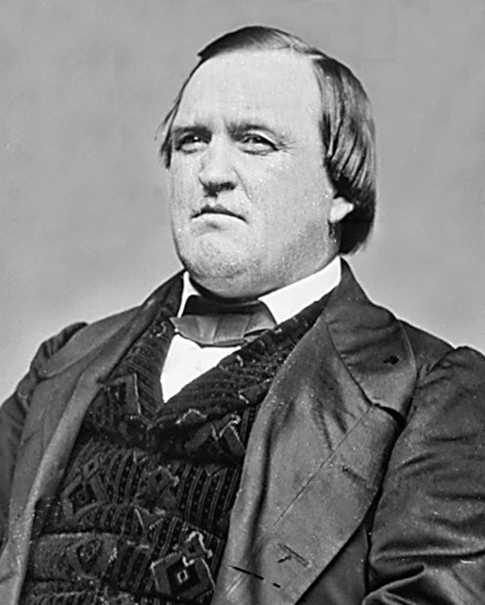
Nominee	Richard Yates Sr.	James Carroll Robinson
Party	Union	Democratic
1st ballot	64 (59.8%)	43 (40.2%)
Senator before election
William A. Richardson
Democratic
Elected Senator
Richard Yates Sr.
Union

Incumbent Democrat William A. Richardson was elected in 1863.

The Union members of the legislature held a caucus in advance of the election. Richard Yates Sr. defeated Elihu B. Washburne with 38 votes to Washburne's 22; John M. Palmer and John A. Logan each had two votes.

The Illinois General Assembly met on January 4, 1865, to hold an election for the next term. Yates defeated Democratic candidate James Carroll Robinson on the first ballot.

== Iowa ==
Iowa election
- January 16, 1864

Members of the Iowa General Assembly Majority of voting members needed to win
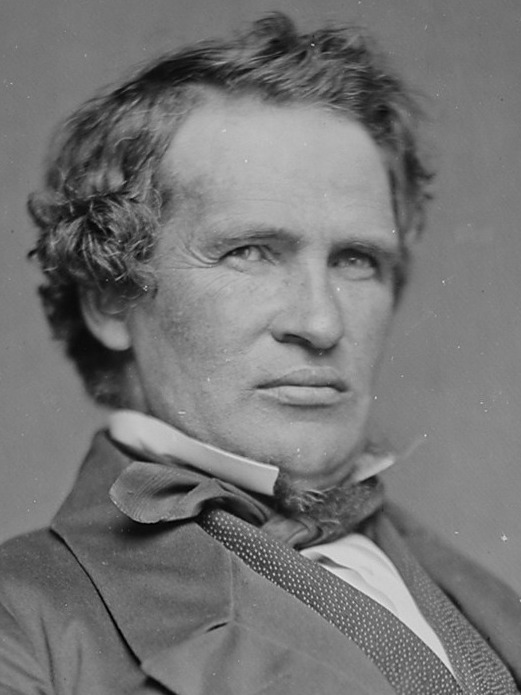

Nominee	James W. Grimes	John D. Jennings
Party	Republican	Democratic
1st ballot	128 (95.5%)	5 (3.7%)
Senator before election
James W. Grimes
Republican
Elected Senator
James W. Grimes
Republican

One-term Republican James W. Grimes was elected in 1858.

Republicans won a landslide victory in the 1863 state elections. The upcoming senatorial election was an issue during the campaign. Grimes was broadly popular with the public, and the Republican members of the incoming legislature were pledged to vote for his re-election.

The Iowa General Assembly met on January 16, 1864, to hold an election for the next term. Grimes defeated Democratic candidate John D. Jennings on the first ballot. One Democratic member voted for James M. Love.

== Kansas ==
Kansas election
- January 12, 1865

Members of the Kansas Legislature Majority of voting members needed to win
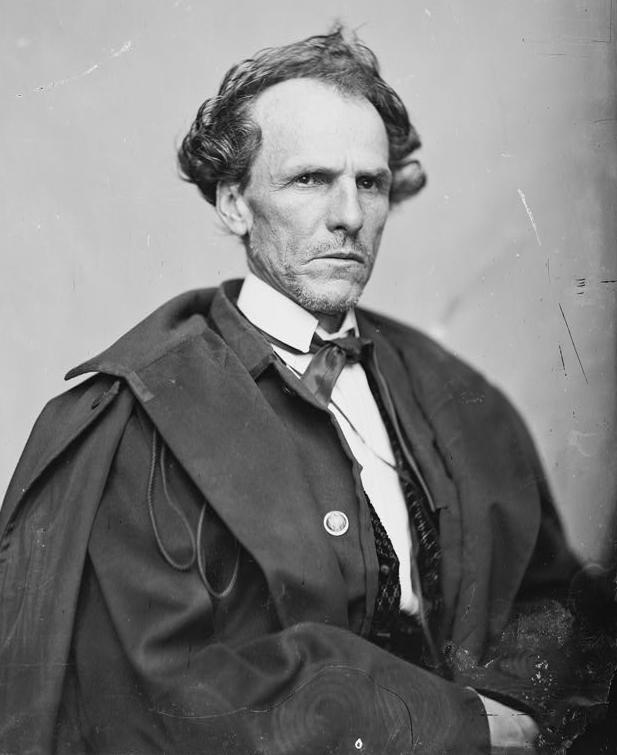

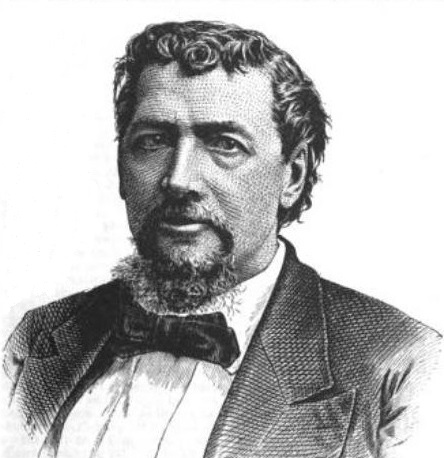
Nominee	Jim Lane	William A. Phillips
Party	Republican	Republican
1st ballot	82 (83.7%)	7 (8.14%)
Senator before election
Jim Lane
Republican
Elected Senator
Jim Lane
Republican

One-term Republican Jim Lane was elected in 1861.

Lane's controversial leadership split the Kansas Republican Party in 1862, leading Anti-Lane Republicans to organize the Union Party. (Note: The Kansas Union Party bore no relation to the National Union Party.) Although Lane's term would not end for more than a year, anti-Lane legislators met on February 9, 1864, to hold an election for the next term, in an attempt to force his departure. Thomas Carney was elected on the first ballot with 68 votes, to three spoilt votes and 27 abstentions. Lane's allies protested that the early election was illegal, but a crisis was averted when Carney declined the office.

Lane's popularity rebounded following the attempted election, as the Union Party's fortunes similarly declined. The senator was credited with the successful response to Price's Missouri Expedition in September 1864, which saw fighting along the Kansas-Missouri border. Republicans swept the 1864 elections in Kansas; the large Republican legislative majority and Lane's recently burnished military record virtually assured his re-election.

The Kansas Legislature met again on January 12, 1865, to hold an election for the next term. Lane defeated William A. Phillips on the first ballot.

== Kentucky ==
Kentucky election
- January 11, 1865

Members of the Kentucky General Assembly Majority of voting members needed to win
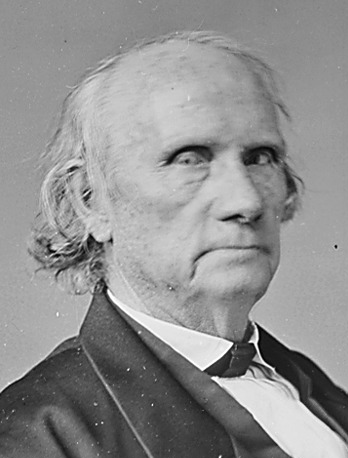

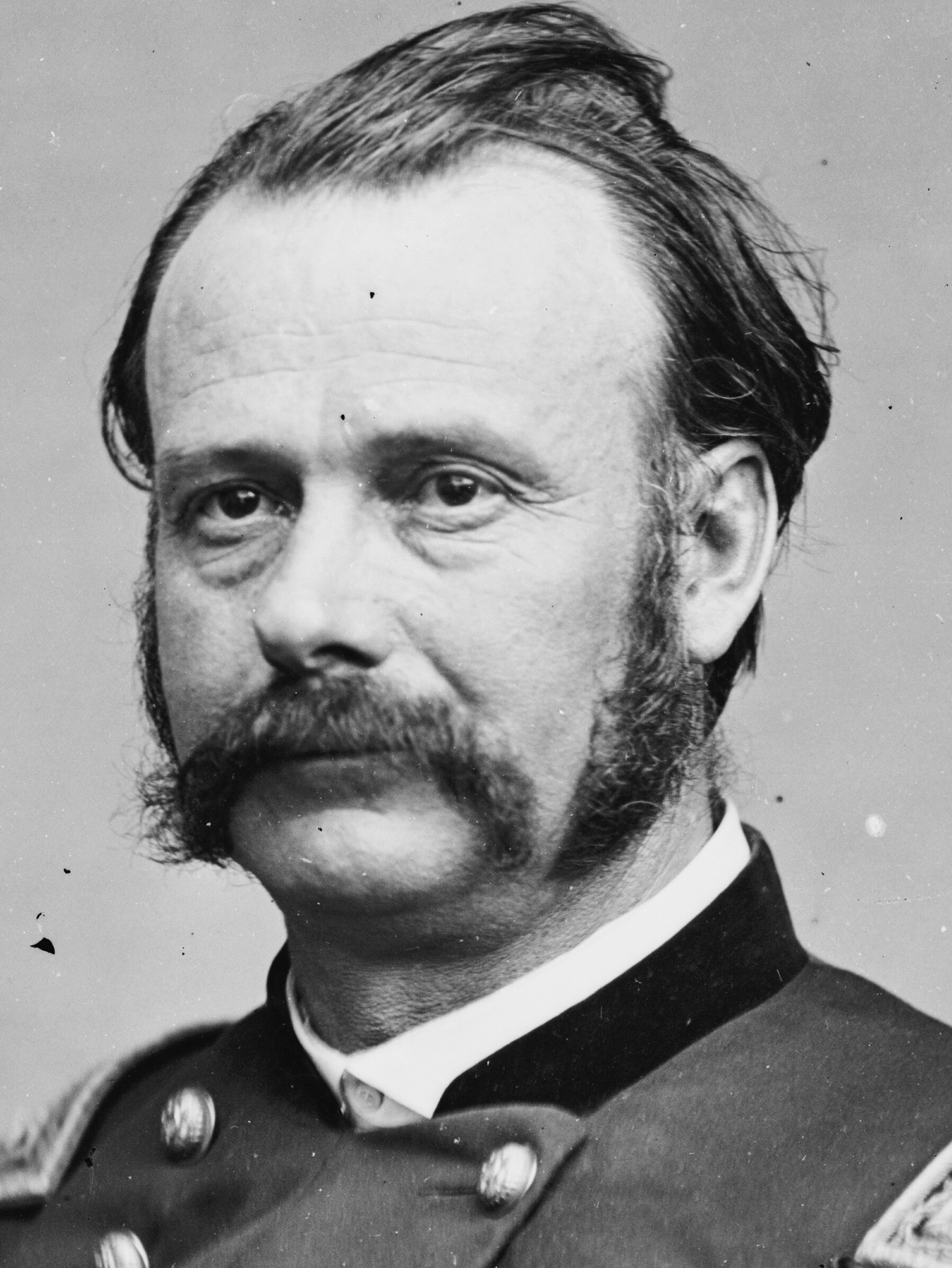
Nominee	James Guthrie	Lovell Rousseau
Party	Democratic	Unconditional Union
1st ballot	65 (51.2%)	56 (44.1%)
Senator before election
Lazarus W. Powell
Democratic
Elected Senator
James Guthrie
Democratic

One-term Democrat Lazarus W. Powell was elected in 1858.

The Kentucky General Assembly met on January 11, 1865, to hold an election for the next term. Democratic candidate James Guthrie defeated Unconditional Union candidate Lovell Rousseau on the first ballot.

== Louisiana ==
Louisiana held two special elections, in addition to the regular election for the Class 2 seat, due to the withdrawal of its senators during the Civil War. The winners were not seated by the Senate.

=== Louisiana (Class 3 special) ===
Louisiana special election (Class 3)
- October 10, 1864

Members of the Louisiana State Legislature Majority of voting members needed to win

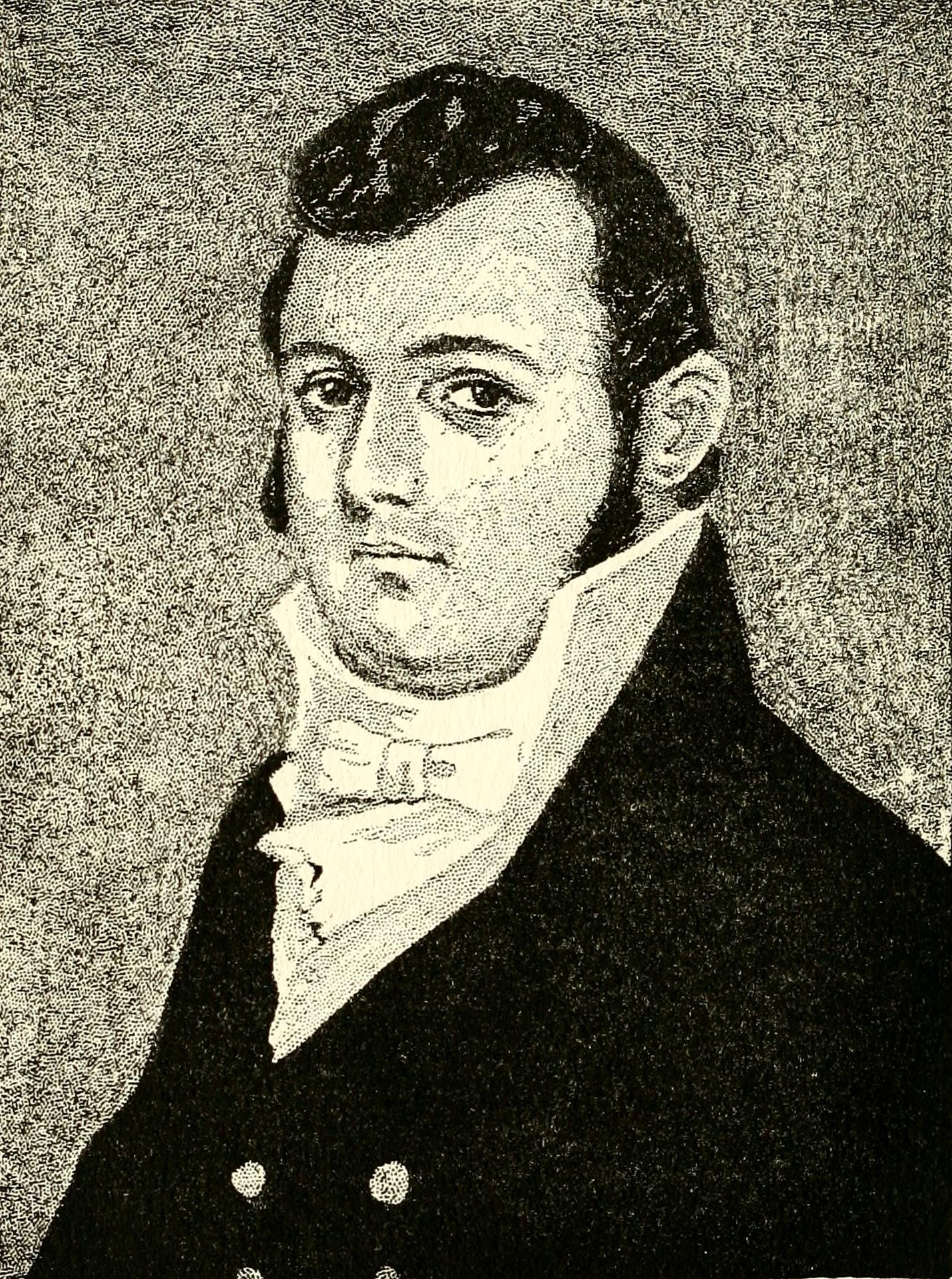

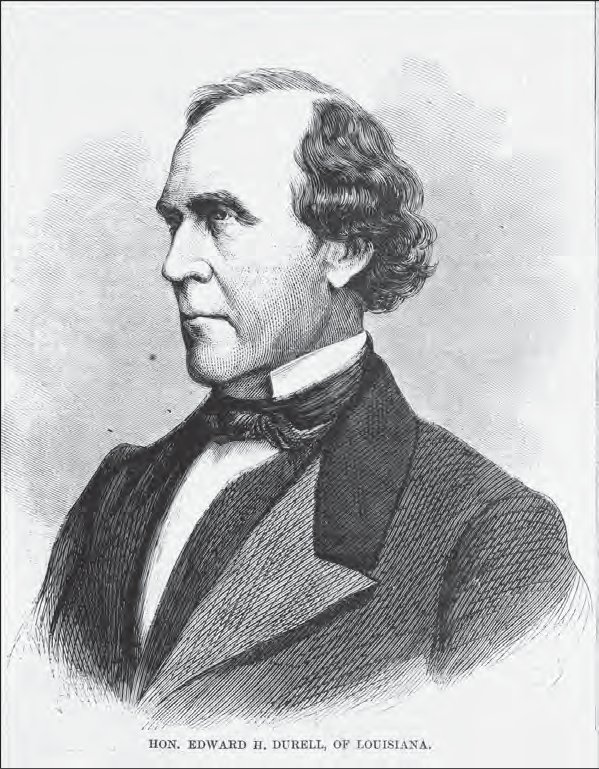
Nominee	R. King Cutler	Cuthbert Bullitt	Edward Henry Durell
Party	Free State	Conservative	Free State
1st ballot	77 (74.0%)	20 (19.2%)	7 (6.7%)
Senator before election
None (vacant since February 4, 1861)
Elected Senator
R. King Cutler (not seated)
Free State

One-term Democrat John Slidell resigned from the Senate on February 4, 1861, following the secession of Louisiana.

The Louisiana State Legislature met on October 10, 1864, to hold a special election for the unexpired term. R. King Cutler defeated Cuthbert Bullitt and Edward Henry Durell on the first ballot. Cutler and Durell were Free Staters, while Bullitt was a Conservative.

=== Louisiana (Class 2 special) ===
Louisiana special election (Class 2)
- October 10, 1864

Members of the Louisiana State Legislature Majority of voting members needed to win

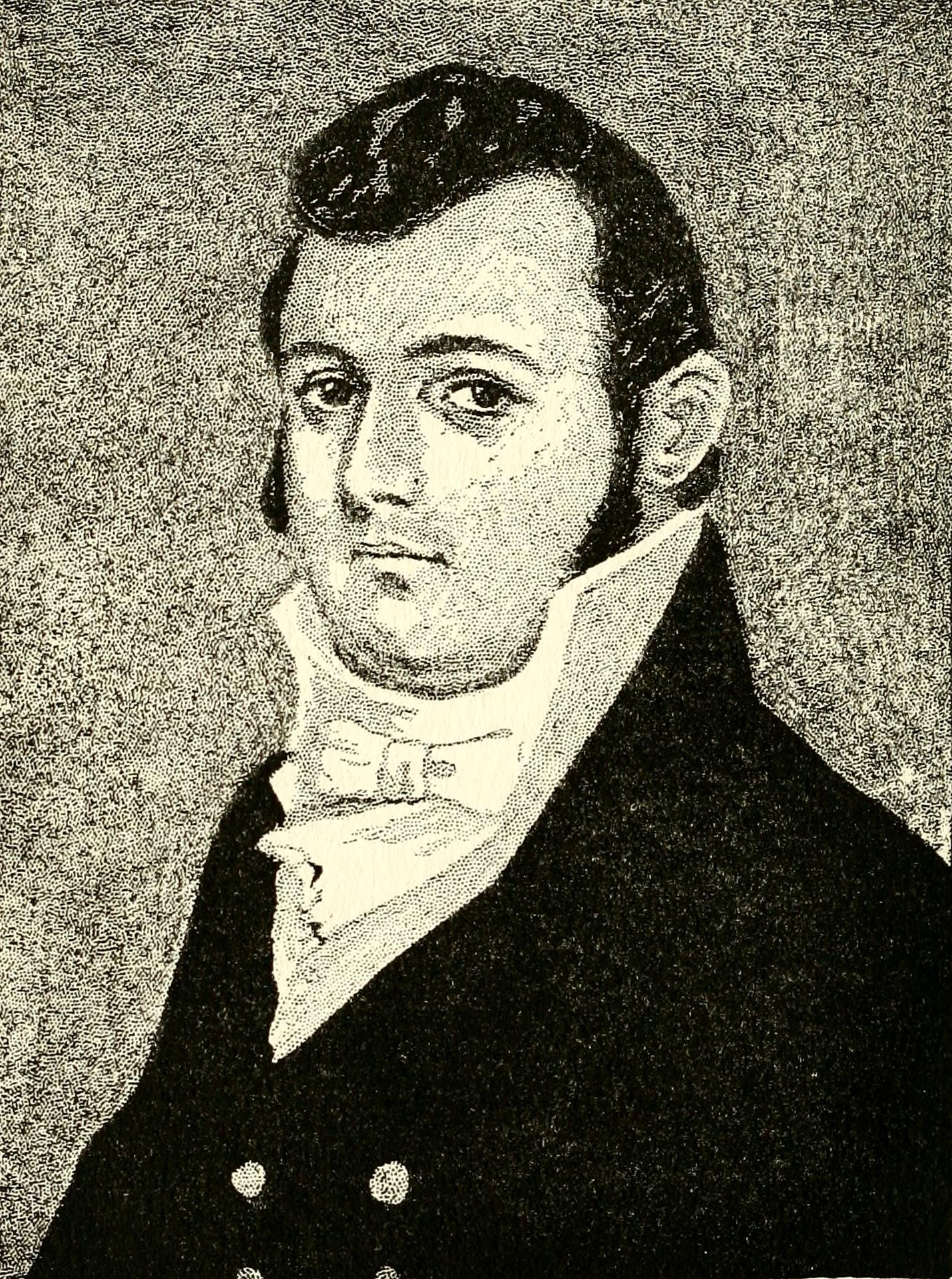

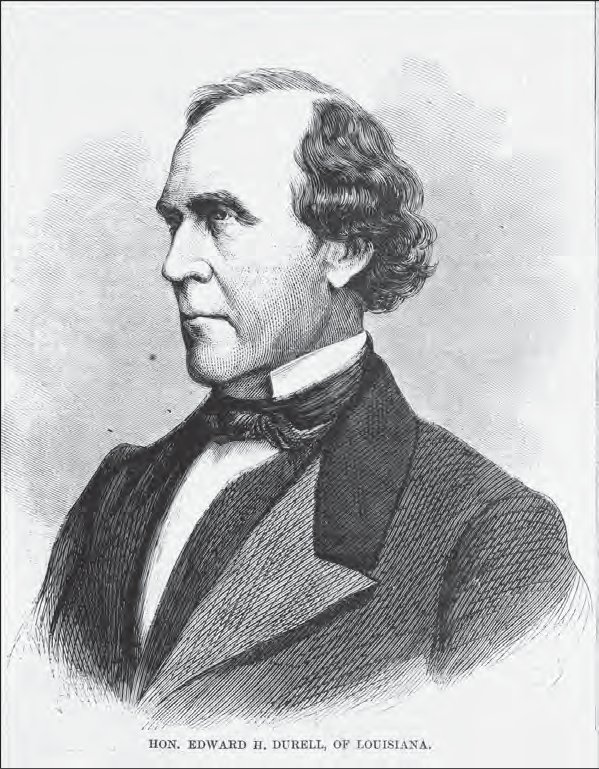
Nominee	Charles Smith	Cuthbert Bullitt	Edward Henry Durell
Party	Free State	Conservative	Free State
1st ballot	62 (59.6%)	35 (33.6%)	7 (6.7%)
Senator before election
None (vacant since March 14, 1861)
Elected Senator
Charles Smith (not seated)
Free State

Two-term Democrat Judah P. Benjamin withdrew from the Senate on March 14, 1861, following the secession of Louisiana.

The Louisiana State Legislature met on October 10, 1864, to hold a special election for the unexpired term. Charles defeated Cuthbert Bullitt and Edward Henry Durell on the first ballot. Smith and Durell were Free Staters, while Bullitt was a Conservative.

=== Louisiana (regular) ===
Louisiana election
- January 9, 1865

Members of the Louisiana State Legislature Majority of voting members needed to win
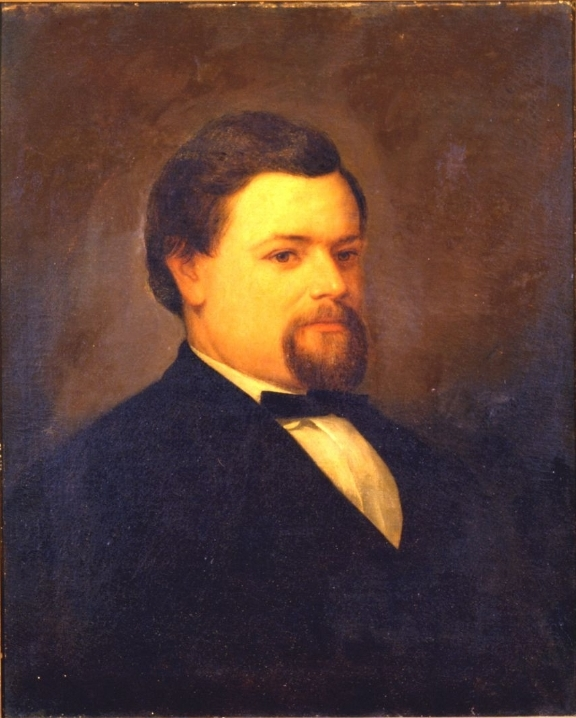

Nominee	Michael Hahn	Charles Smith
Party	Free State	Free State
1st ballot	92 (97.9%)	2 (2.1%)
Senator before election
None (vacant since March 14, 1861)
Elected Senator
Michael Hahn (not seated)
Free State

Free State Republican Charles Smith was elected in 1864, but was not seated by the Senate.

The Louisiana State Legislature met on January 9, 1865, to hold an election for the next term. Michael Hahn defeated Smith on the first ballot. Both candidates were Free Staters.

== Maine ==
Maine held two elections due to the resignation of William P. Fessenden.

=== Maine (regular) ===
Maine election
- January 11, 1865

Members of the Maine Legislature Majority in both houses needed to win
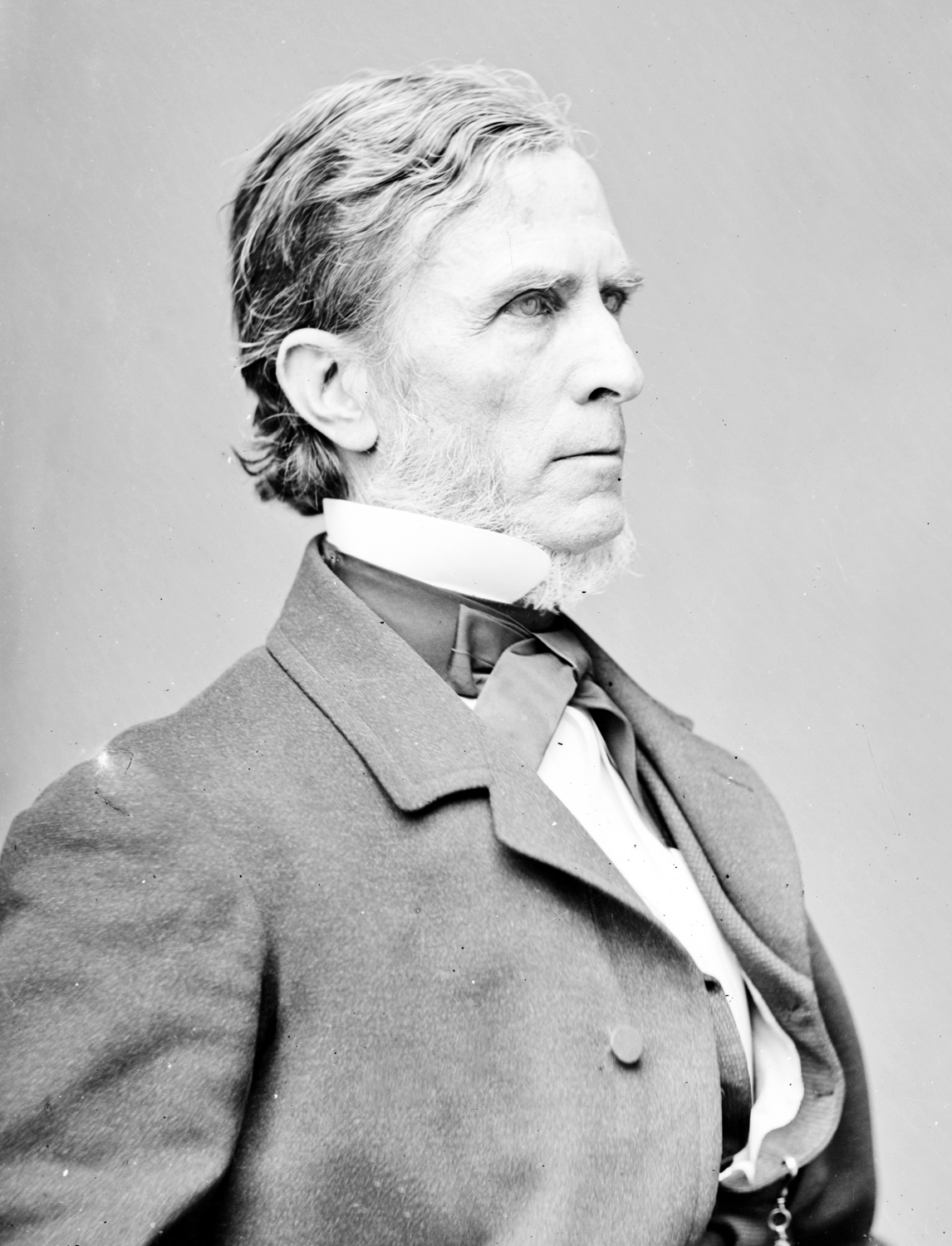

Nominee	William P. Fessenden	William P. Haines
Party	Union	Democratic
House	116 (83.4%)	23 (16.5%)
Senate	27 (100.0%)	—
Senator before election
Nathan A. Farwell
Union
Elected Senator
William P. Fessenden
Union

Incumbent Unionist Nathan A. Farwell was appointed in 1864.

The Senate and the House of Representatives met separately on January 11, 1865, to hold an election for the next term. Union candidate William P. Fessenden defeated Democratic candidate William P. Haines on the first ballot.

=== Maine (special) ===
Maine election
- January 11, 1865

Members of the Maine Legislature Majority in both houses needed to win
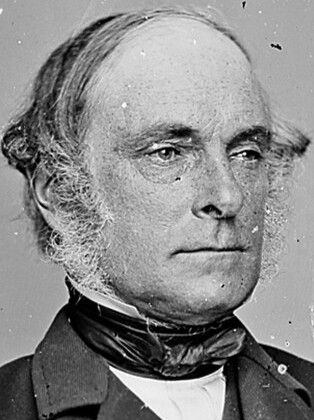

Nominee	Nathan A. Farwell	William P. Haines
Party	Union	Democratic
House	118 (84.9%)	21 (15.1%)
Senate	27 (100.0%)	—
Senator before election
Nathan A. Farwell
Union
Elected Senator
Nathan A. Farwell
Union

Incumbent Unionist Nathan A. Farwell was appointed in 1864.

The Senate and the House of Representatives met separately on January 11, 1865, to hold a special election for the unexpired term. Farwell defeated Democratic candidate William P. Haines on the first ballot.

== Maryland (specials) ==
Maryland held two elections due to the deaths of James Pearce and Thomas Holliday Hicks.

=== Maryland (1864 special) ===
1864 Maryland special election
- January 8, 1864

Members of the Maryland General Assembly Majority of voting members needed to win
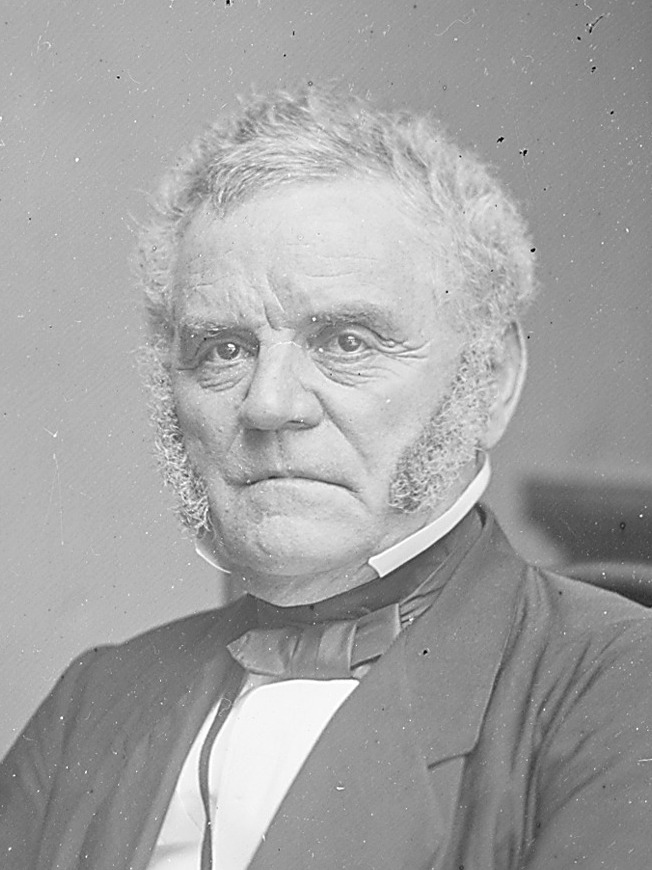

Nominee	Thomas Holliday Hicks	Samuel Hambleton
Party	Union	Democratic
1st ballot	67 (73.6%)	18 (19.8%)
Senator before election
Thomas Holliday Hicks
Union
Elected Senator
Thomas Holliday Hicks
Union

Incumbent Unionist Thomas Holliday Hicks was appointed in 1862 to fill the vacancy created by the death of James Pearce.

The Union members of the legislature held a caucus in advance of the election. Hicks, a recent convert to abolitionism, was opposed by radical candidate Thomas A. Spence. Hicks defeated Spence on the first ballot.

The Maryland General Assembly met on January 8, 1864, to hold a special election for the unexpired term. Hicks defeated Democratic candidate Samuel Hambleton on the first ballot.

=== Maryland (1865 special) ===
1865 Maryland special election
- March 9, 1865

Members of the Maryland General Assembly Majority of voting members needed to win
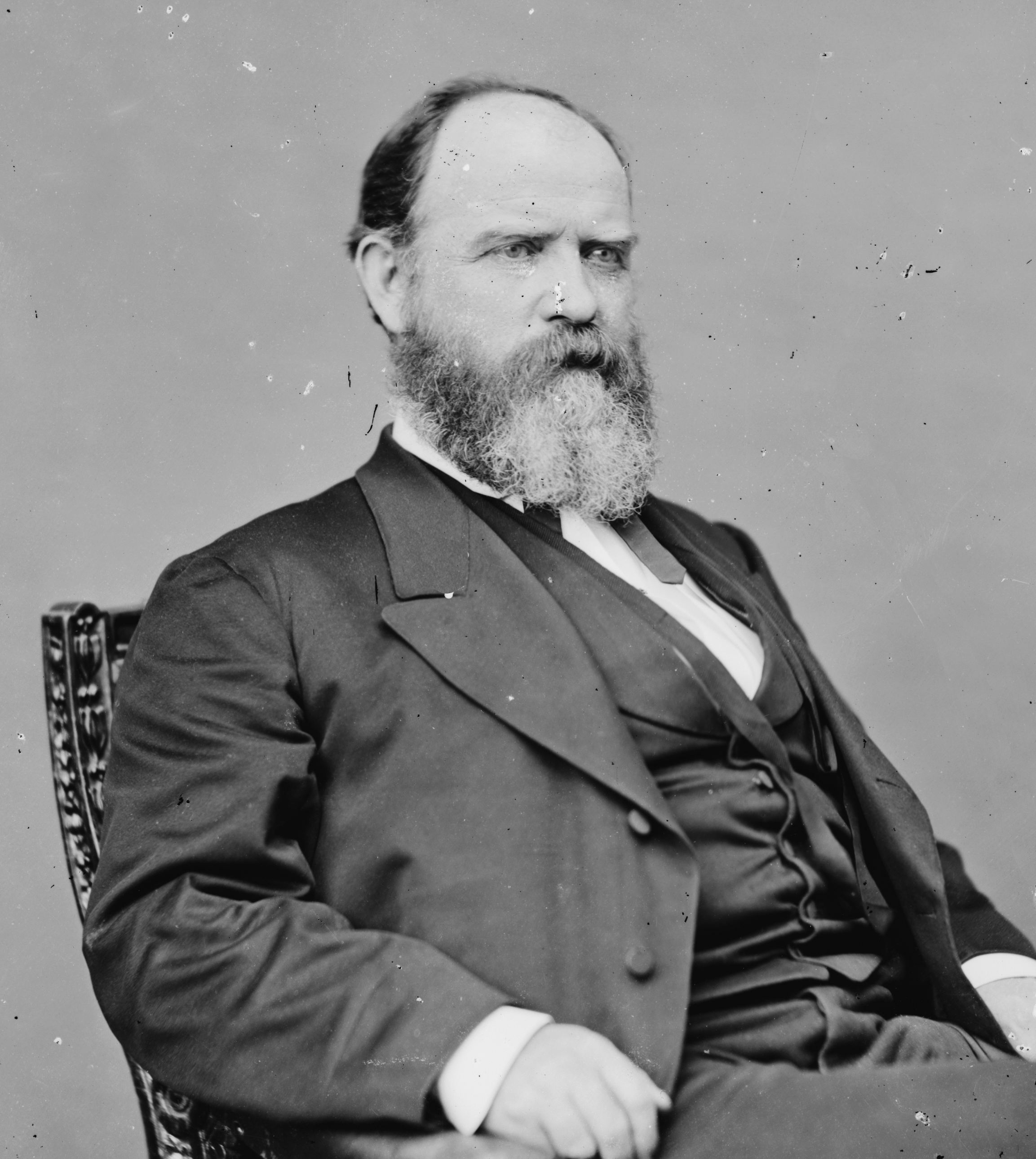

Nominee	John Creswell	Blank
Party	Union
1st ballot	63 (67.7%)	25 (26.9%)
Senator before election
Vacant
Elected Senator
John Creswell
Union

Hicks died in office on February 14, 1865.

The Union members of the legislature held a caucus in advance of the election. John Cresswell was nominated on the first ballot with 43 votes to 22 for other candidates. Creswell, an Unconditional Unionist and protege of the Radical leader Henry Winter Davis, was opposed by supporters of Montgomery Blair, the leader of the conservative Unionists. The Conservatives attempted to form a coalition with the Maryland Democratic Party for the senatorial election, but the Democratic legislators declined to support Blair, instead casting blank votes all through the proceedings.

The Maryland General Assembly met on March 9, 1865, to hold a special election for the unexpired term. Creswell was elected on the first ballot.

== Massachusetts ==
Massachusetts election
- January 10 & 20, 1865

Members of the Massachusetts General Court Majority in both houses needed to win
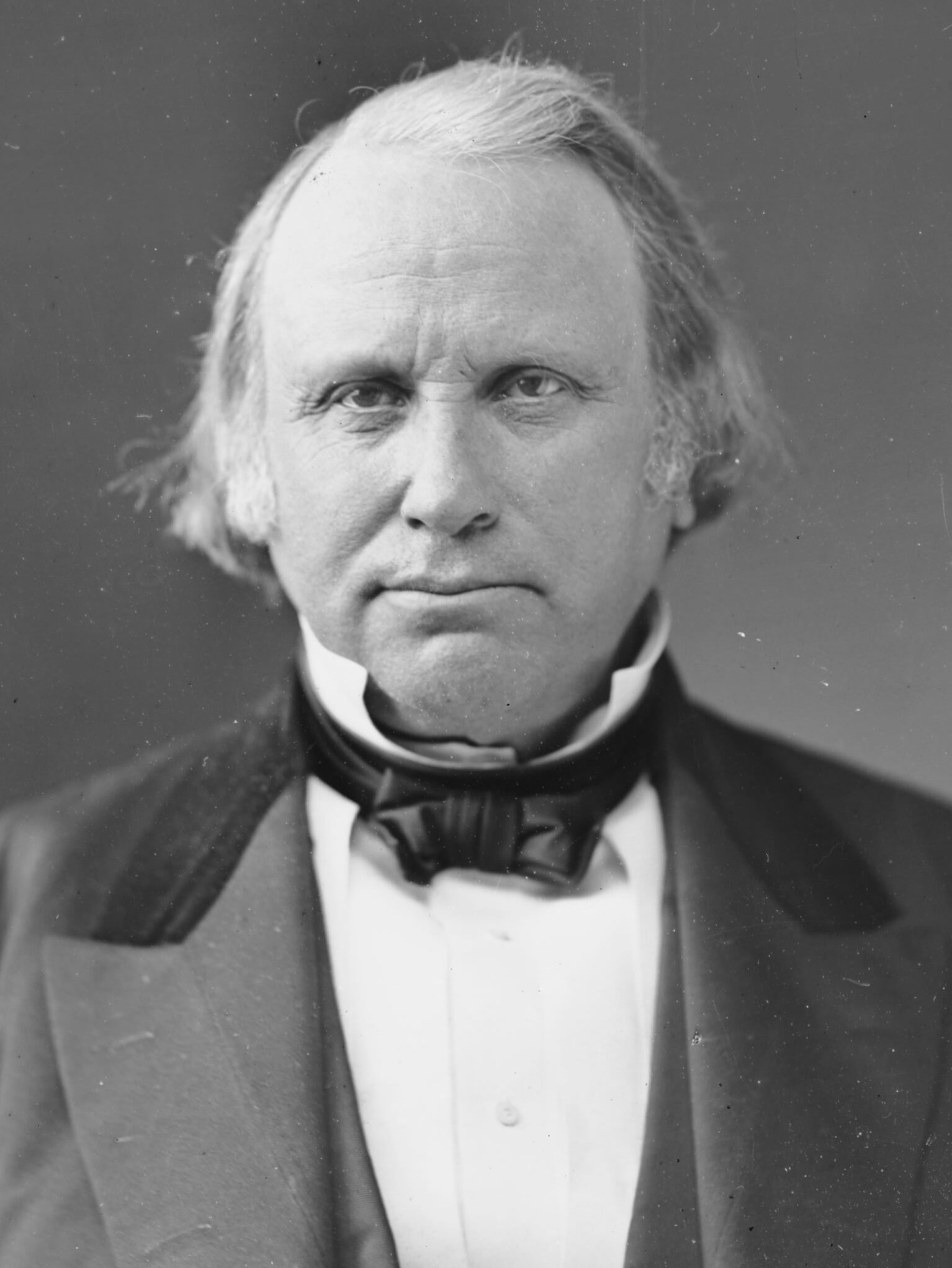

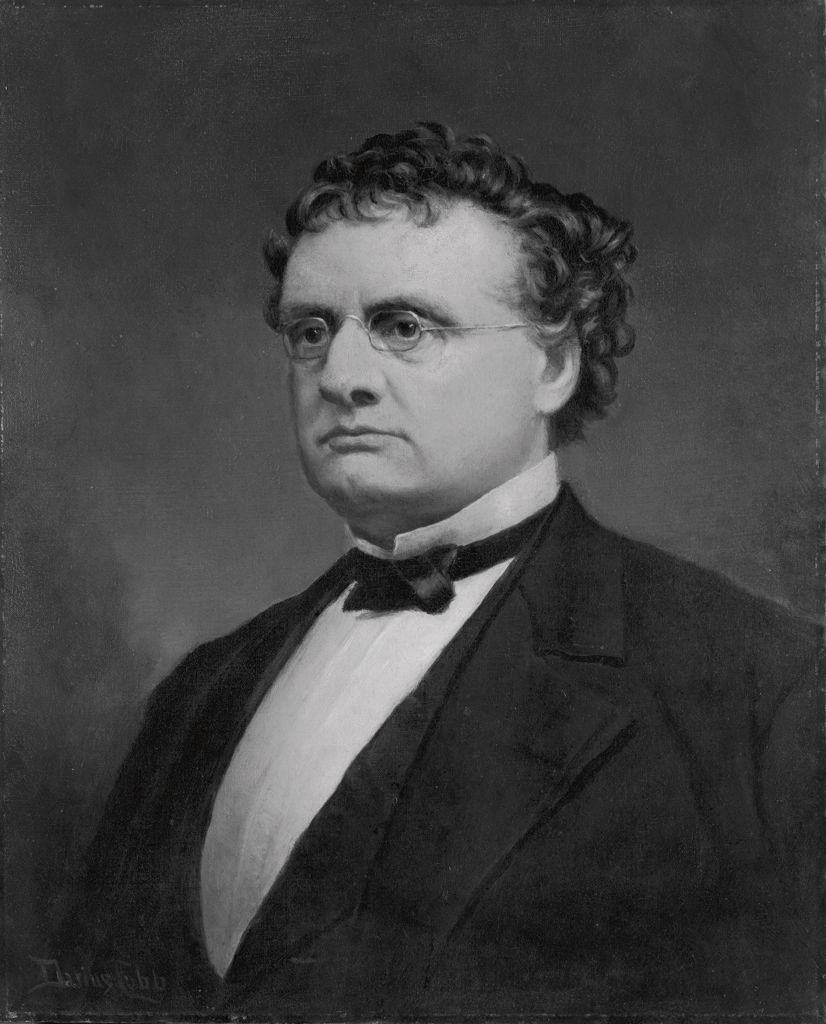
Nominee	Henry Wilson	John Albion Andrew
Party	Republican	Republican
House	207 (92.0%)	12 (5.3%)
Senate	37 (92.5%)	3 (7.5%)
Senator before election
Henry Wilson
Republican
Elected Senator
Henry Wilson
Republican

Two-term Republican Henry Wilson was re-elected in 1859.

Wilson, a radical Republican, faced a challenge by John Albion Andrew, the moderate Republican governor of Massachusetts. The rift between Andrew and Wilson's Senate colleague, Charles Sumner, threatened to split the Massachusetts Republican Party, to the benefit of conservatives in the Republican–Union coalition. Andrew's candidacy attracted minimal support from Republicans, however; his allies' efforts to unseat Wilson were half-hearted, and few Republican legislators were prepared to oppose the popular incumbent.

The Senate and the House of Representatives met separately on January 10 and 20, 1865, respectively, to hold an election for the next term. Wilson defeated Andrew and Robert C. Winthrop on the first ballot.

== Michigan ==
Michigan election
- January 5, 1865

Members of the Michigan Legislature Majority in both houses needed to win
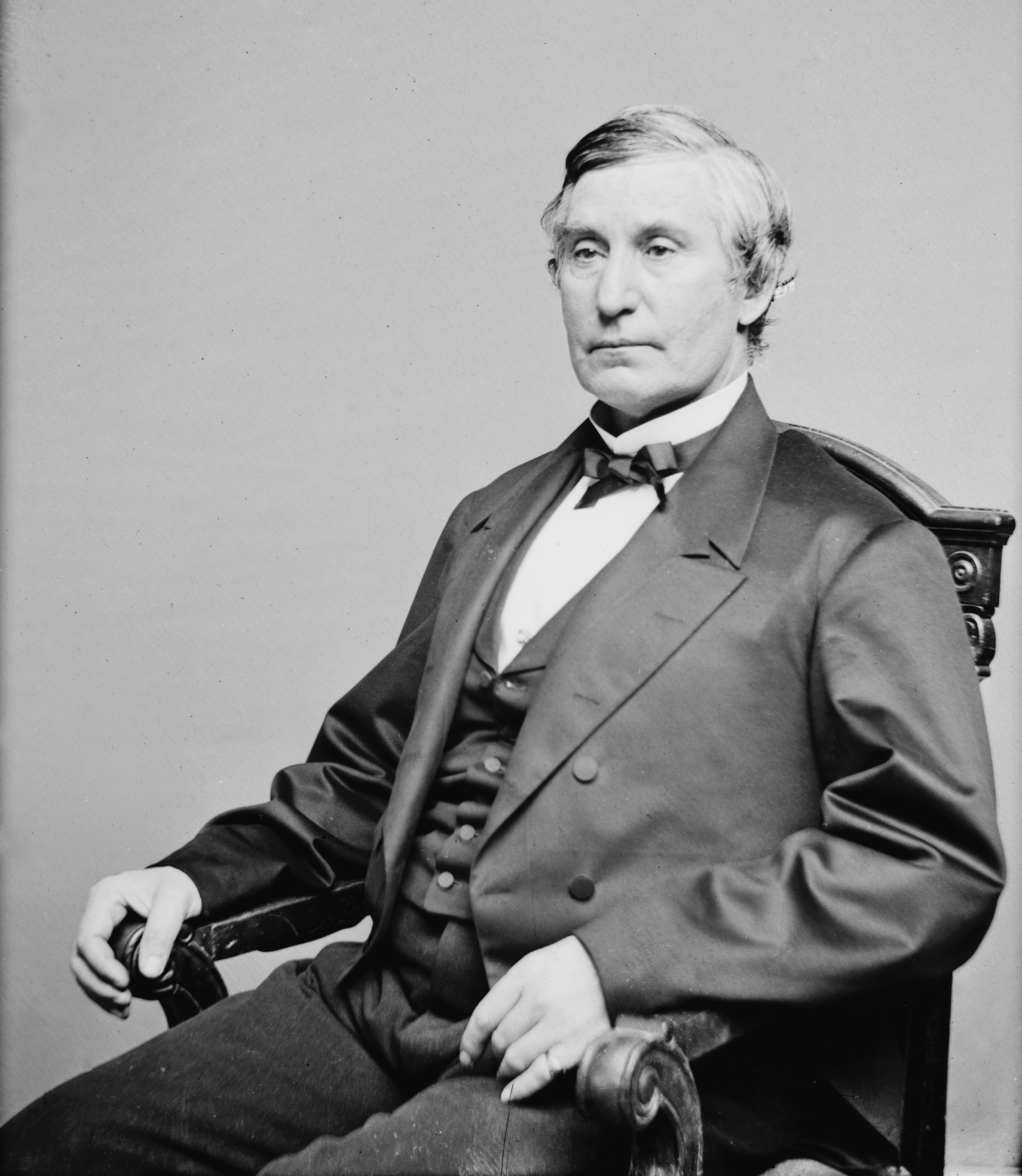

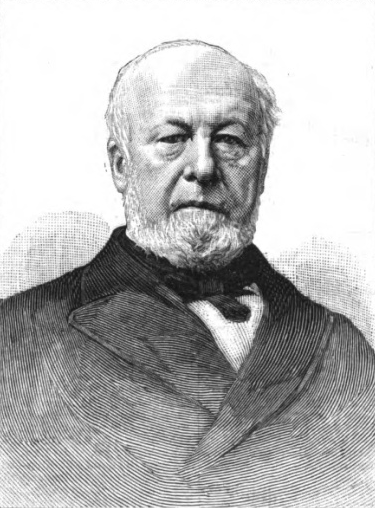
Nominee	Jacob M. Howard	George V. N. Lothrop
Party	Republican	Democratic
House	70 (72.2%)	27 (27.8%)
Senate	27 (30.0%)	3 (10.0%)
Senator before election
Jacob M. Howard
Republican
Elected Senator
Jacob M. Howard
Republican

Incumbent Republican Jacob M. Howard was elected in 1862.

The Republican members of the legislature held a caucus on January 4, 1865. Howard defeated Austin Blair on the first ballot with 56 votes to Blair's 42.

The Senate and the House of Representatives met separately on January 5, 1865, to hold an election for the next term. Howard defeated Democratic candidate George V. N. Lothrop on the first ballot.

== Minnesota ==
Minnesota election
- January 10, 1865

Members of the Minnesota Legislature Majority of voting members needed to win
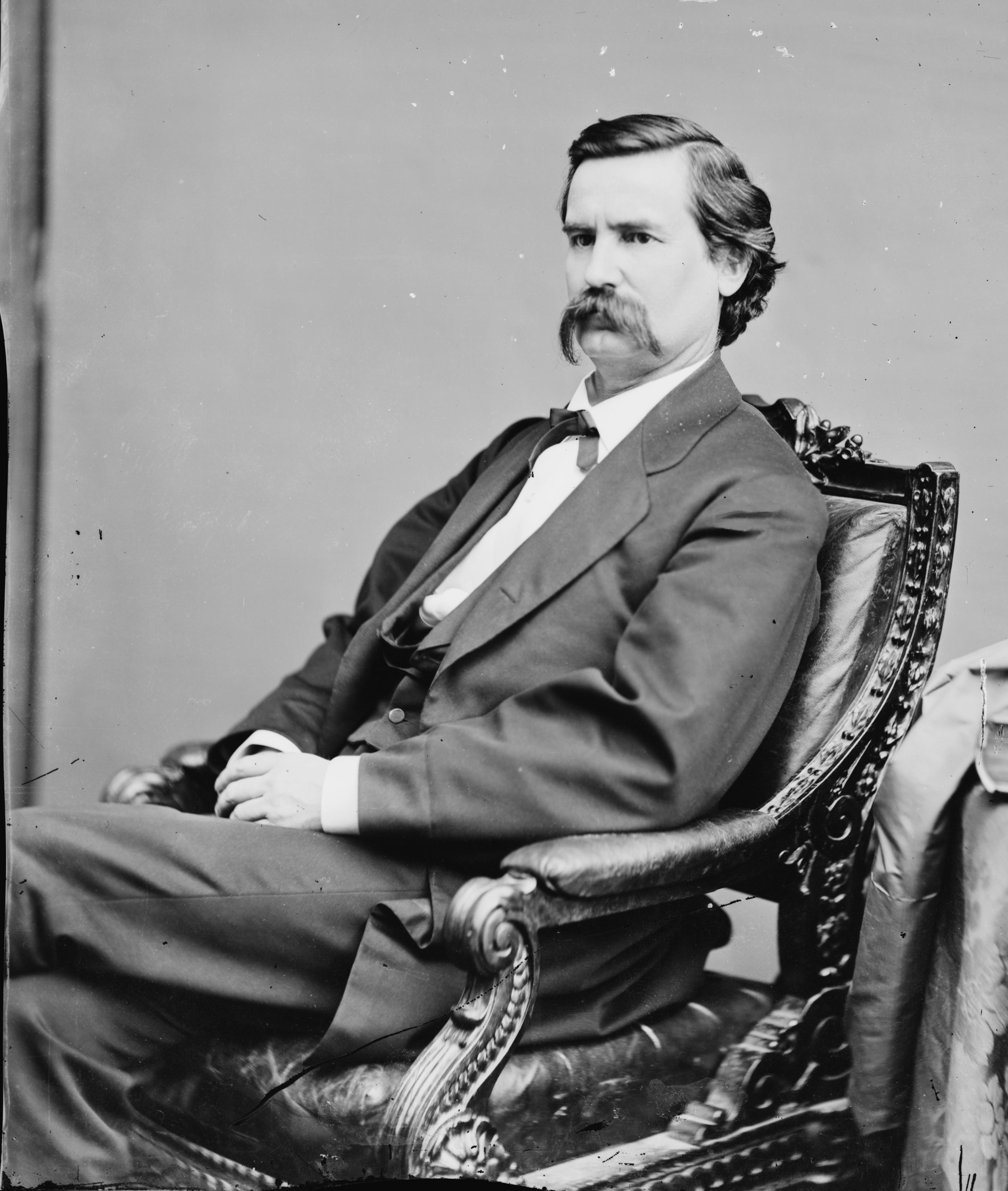

Nominee	Daniel Sheldon Norton	James George
Party	Union	Democratic
1st ballot	46 (78.0%)	13 (22.0%)
Senator before election
Morton S. Wilkinson
Republican
Elected Senator
Daniel Sheldon Norton
Union

One-term Republican Morton S. Wilkinson was elected in 1859.

The Republican members of the legislature held a caucus on January 9, 1865. The War Democrats who had supported Lincoln in the recent presidential election were invited to attend the gathering, which was called the Union caucus. Wilkinson, a radical Republican, faced opposition from conservative Republicans and War Democrats in the Union coalition. Several candidates challenged Wilkinson for the nomination, including Henry Adoniram Swift, the Republican former governor; William Windom, the Republican U.S. representative; Daniel Sheldon Norton, the War Democratic state senator; and Henry M. Rice, the Democratic former U.S. senator. Norton defeated Wilkinson on the 32nd ballot.

The Minnesota Legislature met on January 10, 1865, to hold an election for the next term. Norton defeated Democratic candidate James George on the first ballot.

== Mississippi ==
Mississippi held two elections due to the withdrawal of its senators during the Civil War. The winners were not seated by the Senate.

=== Mississippi (regular) ===
Mississippi election
- October 19–20, 1865

Members of the Mississippi Legislature Majority of voting members needed to win
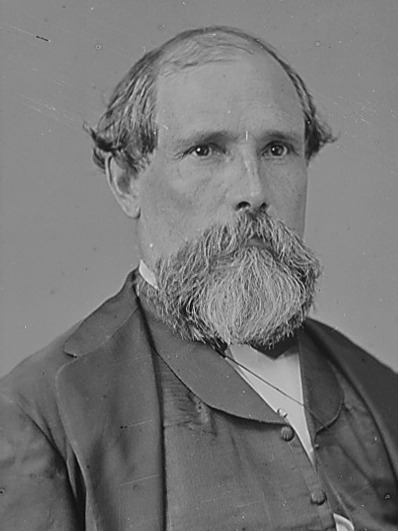

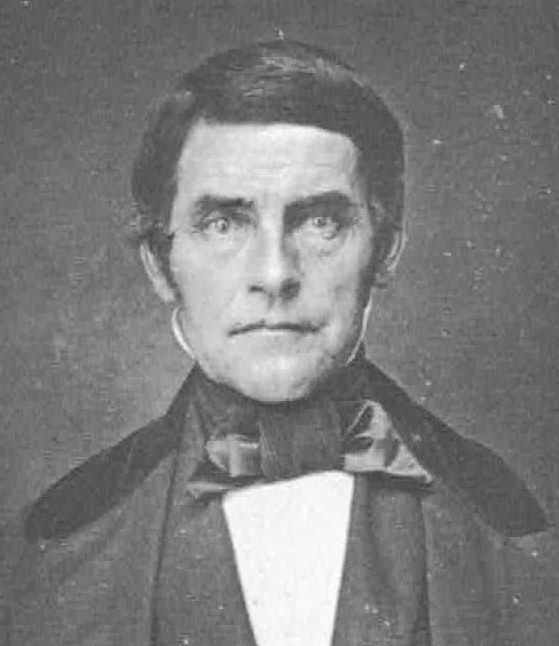

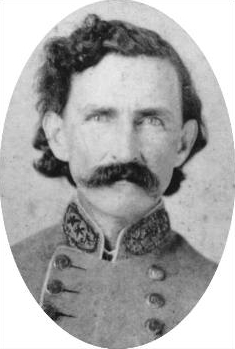

Nominee	James L. Alcorn	Samuel J. Gholson	William Yerger
Party	Whig	Democratic	Whig
1st ballot	40 (32.2%)	21 (16.9%)	26 (21.0%)
4th ballot	74 (58.7%)	33 (26.2%)
Nominee	John William Clark Watson	Edward C. Walthall	William S. Featherston
Party	Whig		Democratic
1st ballot	19 (15.3%)	10 (8.1%)	6 (5.4%)
4th ballot	—	—	—
Senator before election
None (vacant from March 14, 1861)
Elected Senator
James L. Alcorn (not seated)
Whig

Two-term Democrat Albert G. Brown withdrew from the Senate on March 14, 1861, following the secession of Mississippi.

Mississippi conservatives attempted to resurrect the Whig Party during presidential Reconstruction. Pre-war Whigs controlled both chambers of the Mississippi Legislature following the first post-war elections. A resolution requiring candidates for the state's vacant Senate seats to oppose recognizing the civil and political rights of freedpeople was defeated when the legislature met in October 1865. The Whig majority believed that the Republican-controlled Congress would refuse to seat pre-war secessionists elected from the former Confederacy, and that further resistance to emancipation would only prolong Reconstruction.

The legislature met on October 19 and 20, 1865, to hold an election for the next term. The Democratic legislators supported Samuel J. Gholson, a former secessionist and a Confederate veteran. The Whig members were united in opposition to Gholson, but split their votes between several candidates on the first ballot. William Yerger was the preferred candidate of Whigs from the Mississippi Delta, while Whigs from the interior counties were divided between John William Clark Watson and James L. Alcorn, a prewar unionist who later served in the Confederate States Army. Watson withdrew before the fourth ballot, allowing Alcorn to consolidate his supporters. Alcorn defeated Gholston and Yerger on the fourth ballot.

=== Mississippi (special) ===
Mississippi special election
- October 19, 1865

Members of the Mississippi Legislature Majority of voting members needed to win

Nominee	William L. Sharkey	Fulton Anderson
Party	Whig	Whig
1st ballot	100 (79.4%)	26 (20.6%)
Senator before election
None (vacant from March 14, 1861)
Elected Senator
William L. Sharkey (not seated)
Whig

One-term Democrat Jefferson Davis withdrew from the Senate on March 14, 1861, following the secession of Mississippi.

The Mississippi Legislature met on October 19, 1865, to hold a special election for the unexpired term. William L. Sharkey defeated Fulton Anderson on the first ballot. Both candidates were Whigs.

== Nevada (special) ==
Nevada special election
- December 15–16, 1864

Members of the Nevada Legislature Majority of voting members needed to win
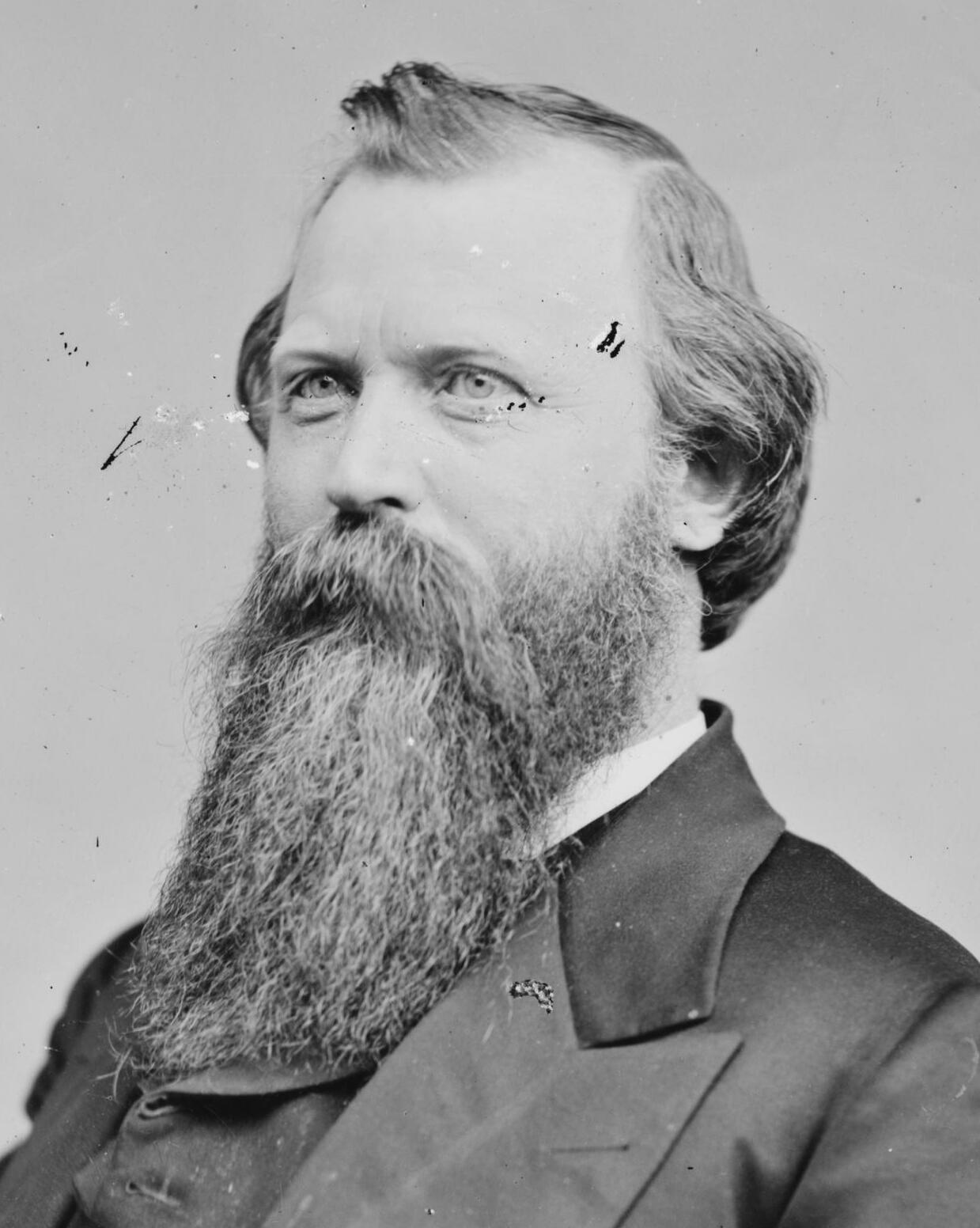

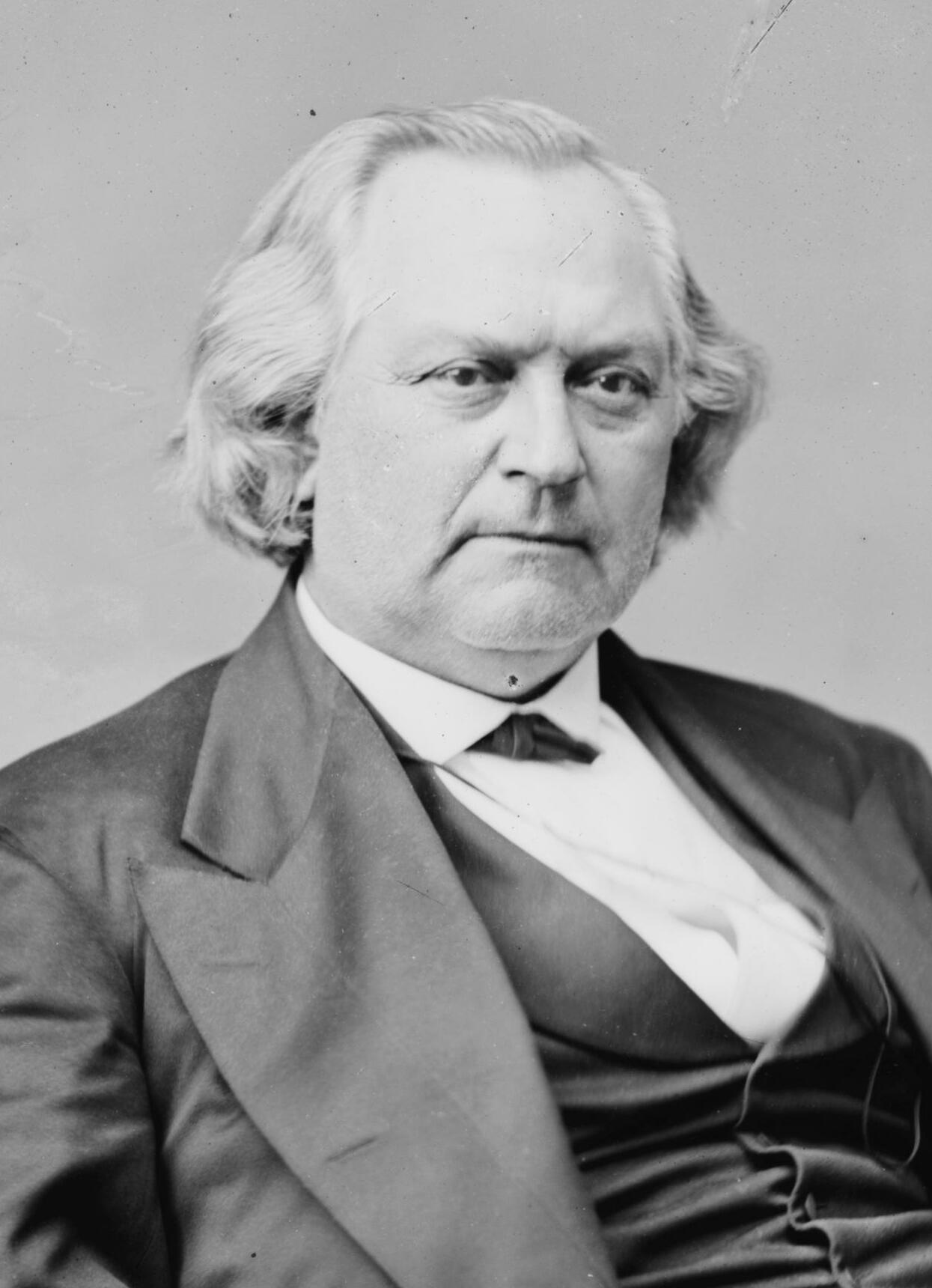

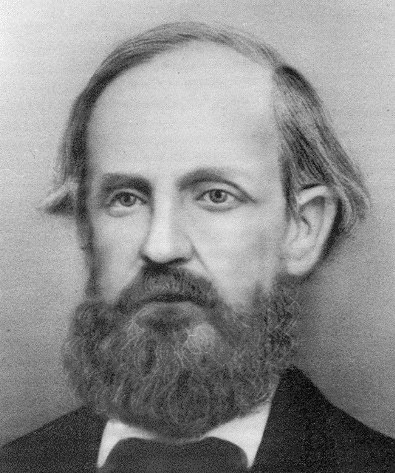

Nominee	William Morris Stewart	James W. Nye	Charles E. DeLong
Party	Union	Union	Union
1st ballot	33 (63.5%)	23 (44.2%)	23 (44.2%)
9th ballot	✓	29 (55.8%)	16 (30.8%)
Nominee	John Cradlebaugh	Bernard C. Whitman
Party	Independent Union	Union
1st ballot	12 (23.1%)	13 (25.0%)
9th ballot	7 (13.5%)	—
Elected Senator
William Morris Stewart (Class 1)
James W. Nye (Class 3)
Union

Nevada elected two senators following its admission on October 31, 1864.

The Union Party won a landslide victory in the first state elections, electing the governor, U.S. representative, all but two seats in the Nevada Legislature. The overwhelming Union majority in the legislature ensured that two Unionists would be chosen as the state's first U.S. senators.

The Nevada Legislature met on December 15 and 16, 1864, to hold elections for both seats. Members voted for two candidates, with 27 votes necessary for election. William Morris Stewart was elected on the first ballot; no other candidate had a majority, requiring several additional rounds of voting.

On subsequent rounds, each member cast one vote. James W. Nye defeated Charles E. DeLong on the ninth ballot.

== New Hampshire ==
New Hampshire election
- June 15, 1864

Members of the New Hampshire General Court Majority in both houses needed to win
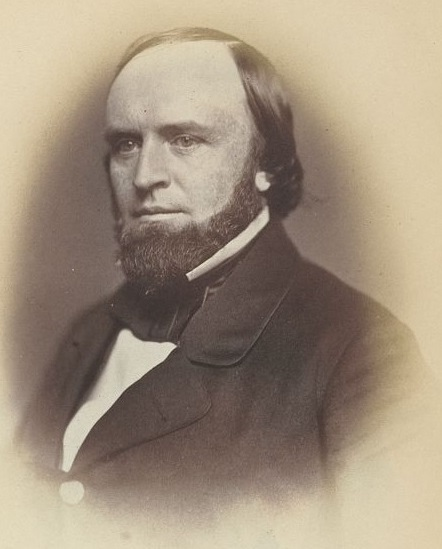

Nominee	Aaron H. Cragin	John H. George
Party	Republican	Democratic
House	201 (63.0%)	113 (35.4%)
Senate	8 (72.7%)	3 (27.3%)
Senator before election
John P. Hale
Republican
Elected Senator
Aaron H. Cragin
Republican

Two-term Republican John P. Hale was re-elected in 1859.

The Republican members of the legislature held a caucus on June 9, 1864. Hale's age, long tenure in office, and clashes with Lincoln's cabinet led several challengers to enter the race prior to the caucus. Hale finished a distant third place on the informal first ballot and lost votes on each subsequent round. Aaron H. Cragin defeated Gilman Marston on the fourth ballot.

The Senate and the House of Representatives met separately on June 15, 1864, to hold an election for the next term. Cragin defeated Democratic candidate John H. George on the first ballot.

== New Jersey ==
New Jersey election
- March 15, 1865

Members of the New Jersey General Assembly Majority of voting members needed to win
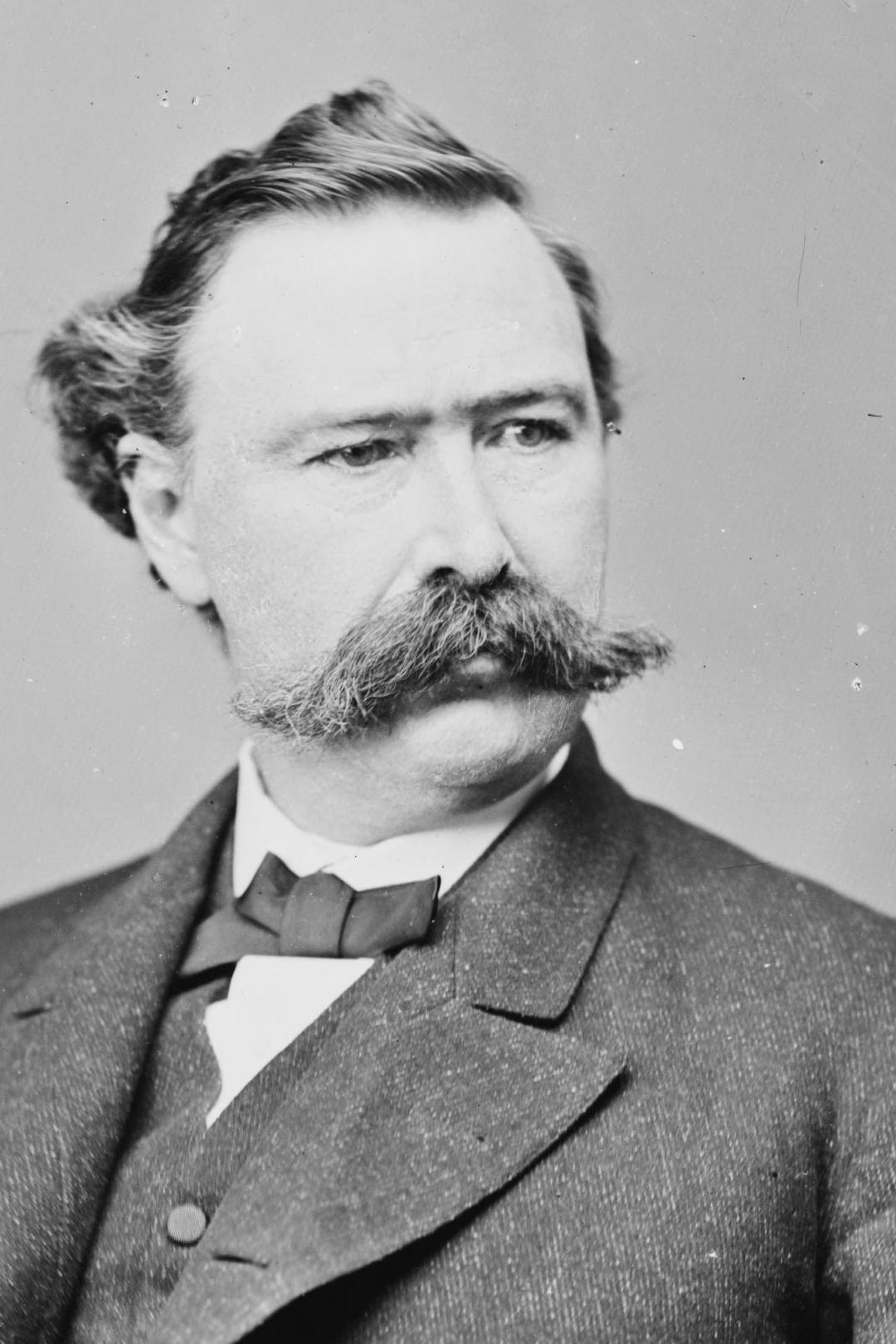

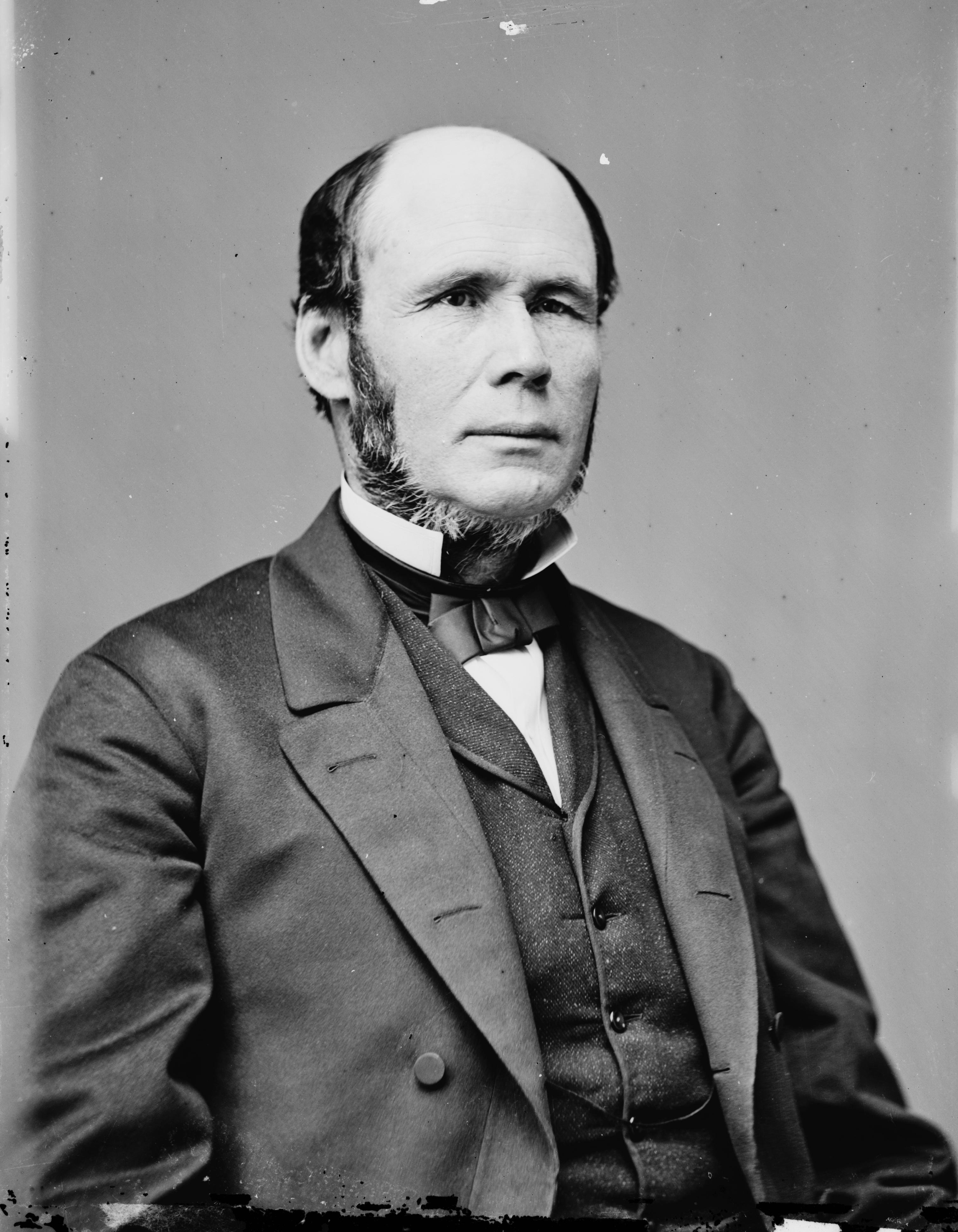
Nominee	John P. Stockton	John C. Ten Eyck
Party	Democratic	Union
1st ballot	40 (49.4%)	37 (45.7%)
Senator before election
John C. Ten Eyck
Union
Elected Senator
John P. Stockton
Democratic

One-term Unionist John C. Ten Eyck was elected in 1858 United States Senate election in New Jersey.

The New Jersey General Assembly met on March 15, 1865, to hold an election for the next term. Democratic candidate John P. Stockton defeated Ten Eyck with a plurality on the first ballot. One Unionist and three Democrats voted for other candidates. Stockton was later unseated by the Senate.

== North Carolina ==
North Carolina held two elections due to the expulsion of its senators during the Civil War. The winners were not seated by the Senate.

=== North Carolina (regular) ===
North Carolina election
- December 4, 1865

Members of the North Carolina General Assembly Majority of voting members needed to win
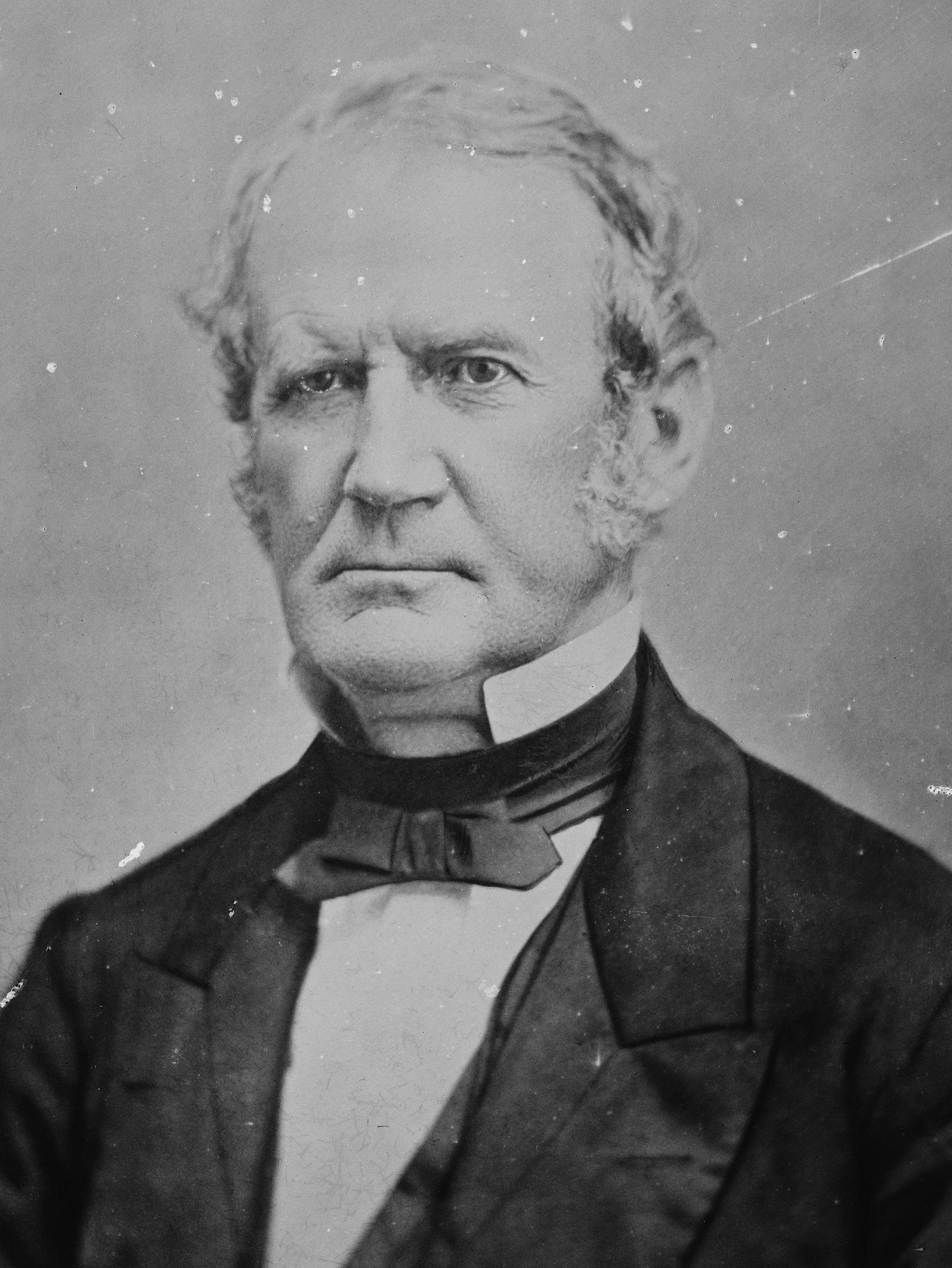

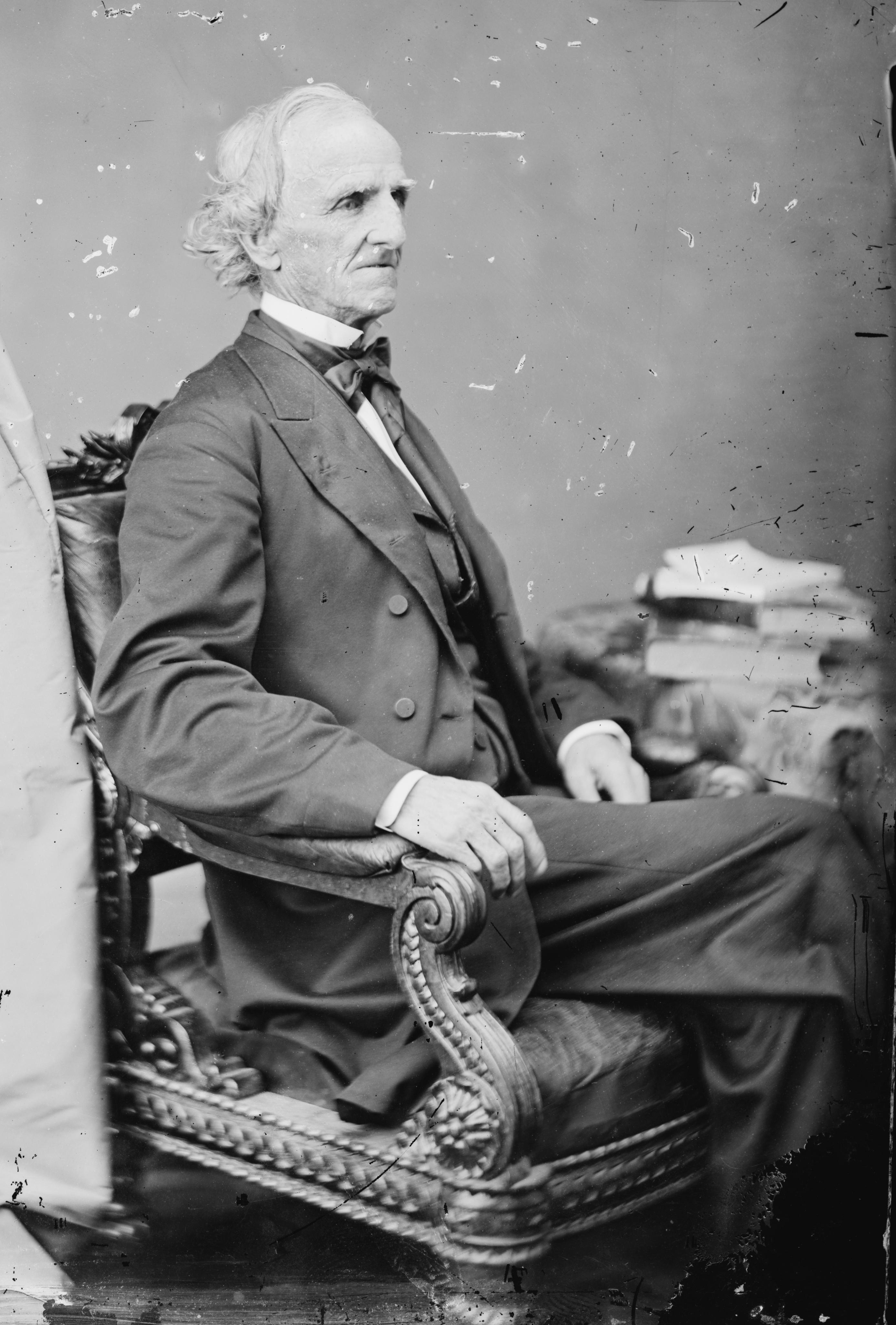
Nominee	William Alexander Graham	Nathaniel Boyden
1st ballot	138 (89.6%)	8 (5.2%)
Senator before election
None (vacant from July 11, 1861)
Elected Senator
William Alexander Graham (not seated)

One-term Democrat Thomas Bragg was expelled from the Senate on July 11, 1861.

The North Carolina General Assembly met on December 4, 1865, to hold an election for the next term. William Alexander Graham defeated Nathaniel Boyden on the first ballot.

=== North Carolina (special) ===
North Carolina special election
- December 4–5, 1865

Members of the North Carolina General Assembly Majority of voting members needed to win
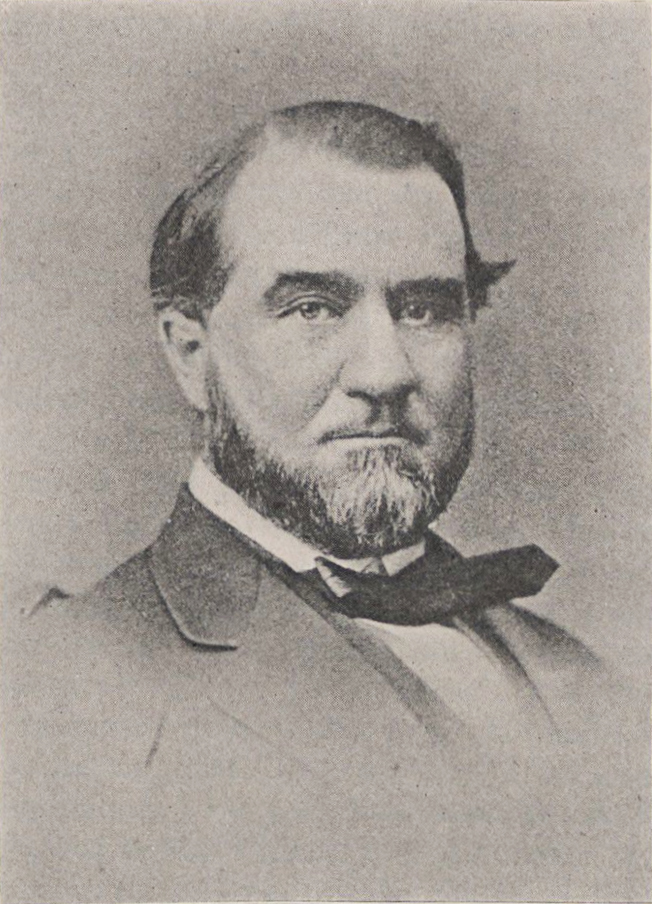

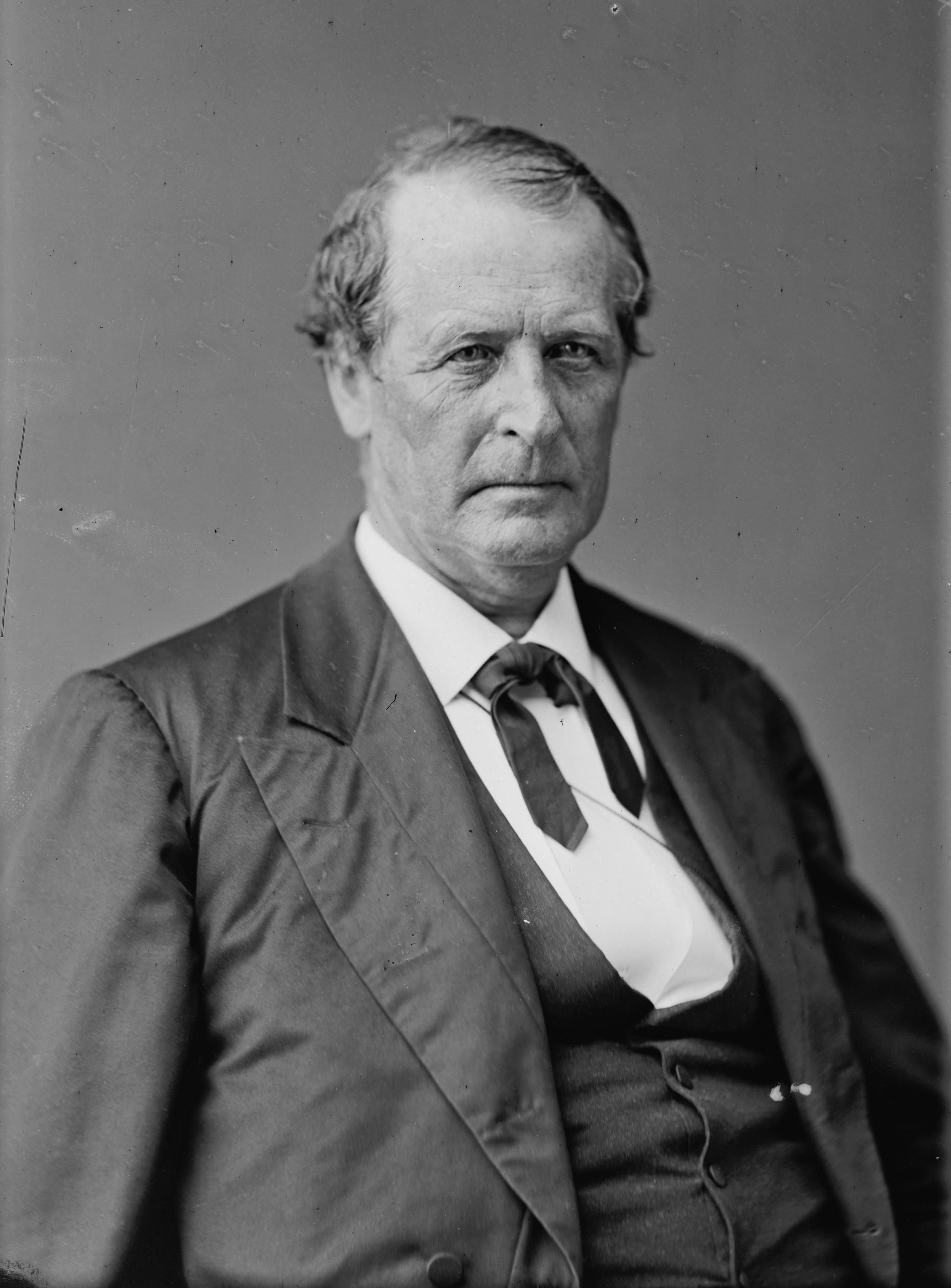

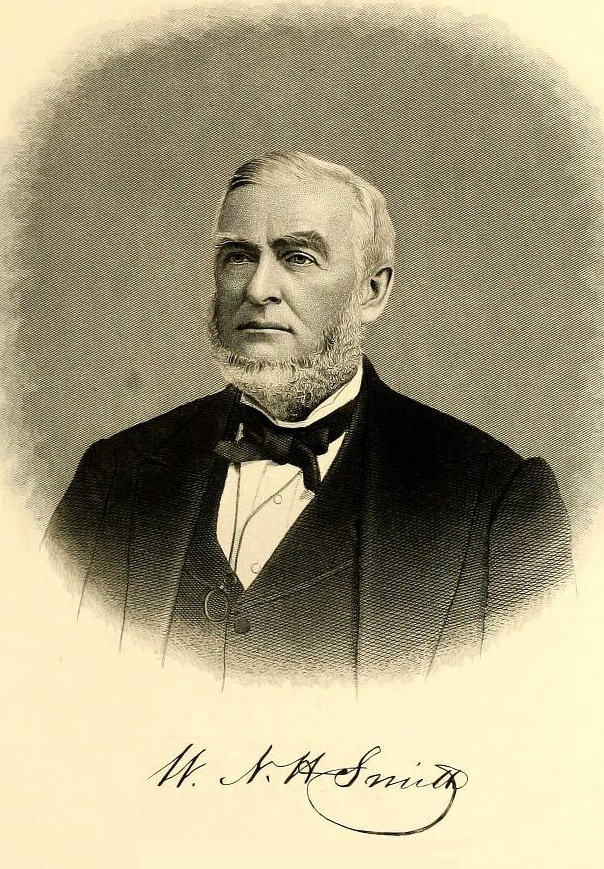

Nominee	John Pool	Thomas Samuel Ashe
1st ballot	80 (50.0%)	47 (29.4%)
2nd ballot	93 (57.0%)	60 (36.8%)
Nominee	William N. H. Smith	Bedford Brown
1st ballot	2 (1.2%)	22 (13.8%)
2nd ballot	9 5.5%	—
Senator before election
None (vacant from July 11, 1861)
Elected Senator
John Pool (not seated)

One-term Democrat Thomas L. Clingman was expelled from the Senate on July 11, 1861.

The North Carolina General Assembly met on December 4 and 5, 1865, to hold a special election for the unexpired term. John Pool defeated Thomas Samuel Ashe on the second ballot.

== Oregon ==
Oregon election
- September 15, 1864

Members of the Oregon Legislative Assembly Majority of voting members needed to win
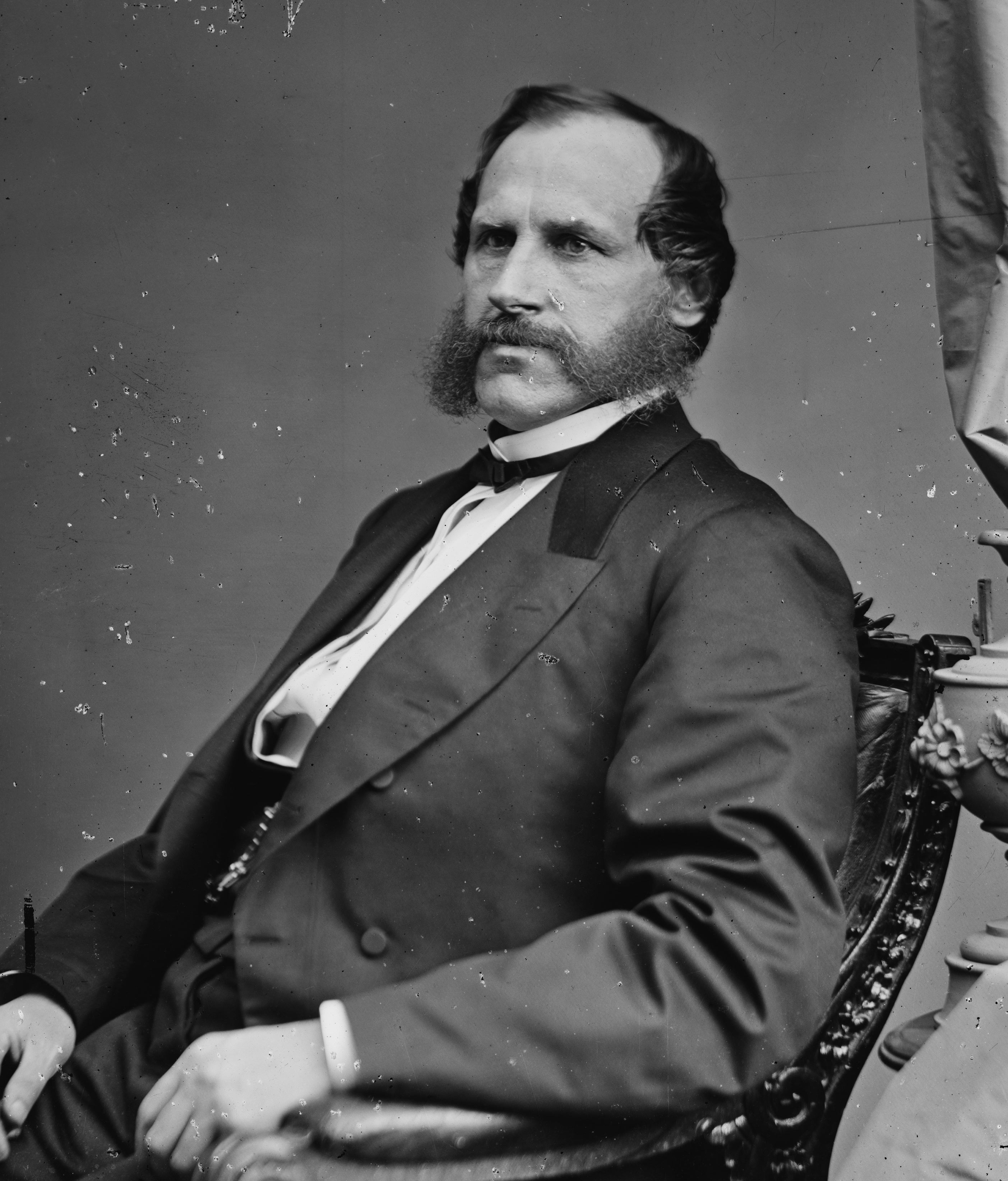

Nominee	George Henry Williams	Thomas H. Pearne	John F. Miller
Party	Union	Union	Democratic
1st ballot	27 (49.1%)	20 (36.4%)	6 (10.9%)
3rd ballot	31 (56.4%)	16 (29.1%)	6 (10.9%)
Senator before election
Benjamin F. Harding
Union
Elected Senator
George Henry Williams
Union

Incumbent Unionist Benjamin F. Harding was elected in 1862.

The radical faction gained control of the Oregon Union Party in 1864, naming War Democrat-turned-abolitionist George Henry Williams chairman of the Union State Executive Committee. The radical drift of the Union Party left the formerly-influential Harding politically homeless. Harding and other regular War Democrats considered rejoining the Oregon Democratic Party, but the Democratic state convention refused to moderate its opposition to the war. The Union Party won a landslide victory in the state elections, retaining control of the Oregon Legislative Assembly.

The legislature met in joint session on September 15, 1864, to hold an election for the next term. Williams defeated Thomas H. Pearne on the third ballot.

== Rhode Island ==
Rhode Island election
- June 1, 1864

Members of the Rhode Island General Assembly Majority of voting members needed to win
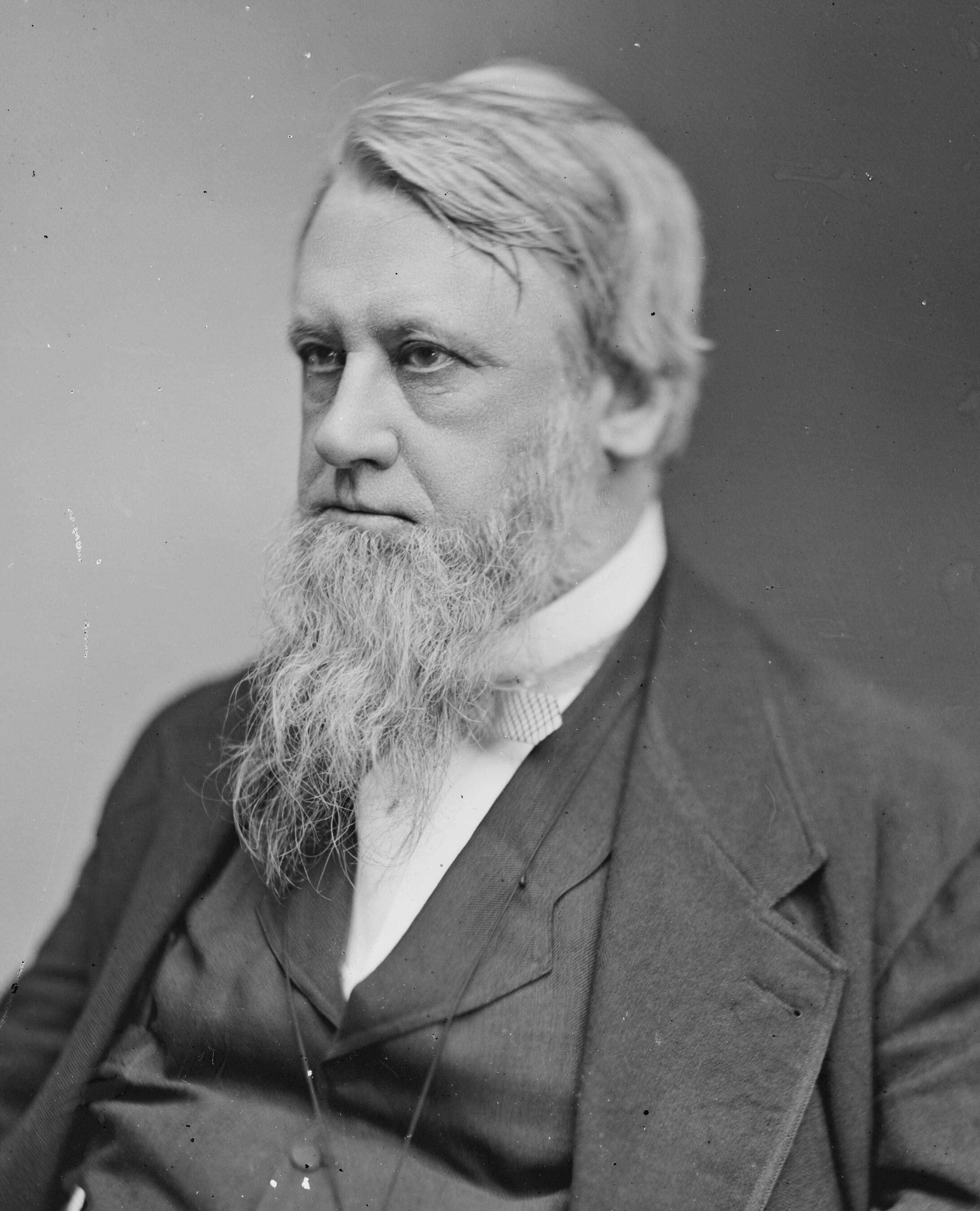

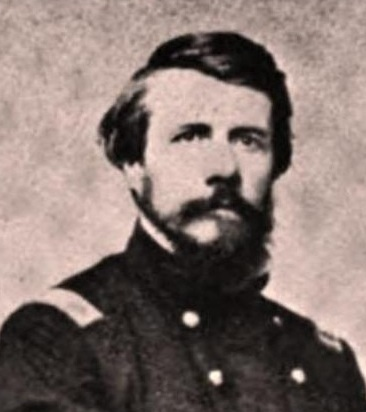
Nominee	Henry B. Anthony	George H. Browne
Party	Union	Democratic
1st ballot	75 (72.1%)	27 (26.0%)
Senator before election
Henry B. Anthony
Union
Elected Senator
Henry B. Anthony
Union

One-term Unionist Henry B. Anthony was elected in 1858.

The Rhode Island General Assembly met in joint session on June 1, 1864, to hold an election for the next term. Anthony defeated Democratic candidate George H. Browne on the first ballot.

== South Carolina ==
South Carolina held two elections due to the withdrawal and expulsion of its senators during the Civil War. The winners were not seated by the Senate.

=== South Carolina (regular) ===
South Carolina election
- October 30, 1865

Members of the South Carolina General Assembly Majority of voting members needed to win
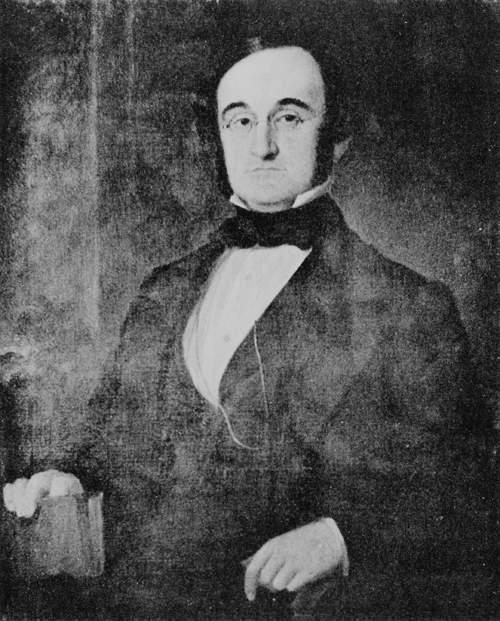

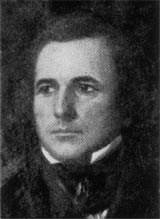
Nominee	Benjamin Franklin Perry	John Lawrence Manning
1st ballot	109 (76.2%)	24 (16.8%)
Senator before election
None (vacant from July 11, 1861)
Elected Senator
Benjamin Franklin Prescott (not seated)

One-term Democrat James Chesnut Jr. was expelled from the Senate on July 11, 1861.

The South Carolina General Assembly met in joint session on October 30, 1865, to hold an election for the next term. Benjamin Franklin Perry defeated John Lawrence Manning on the first ballot.

=== South Carolina (special) ===
South Carolina election
- October 31–November 1, 1865

Members of the South Carolina General Assembly Majority of voting members needed to win
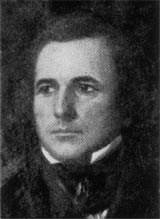

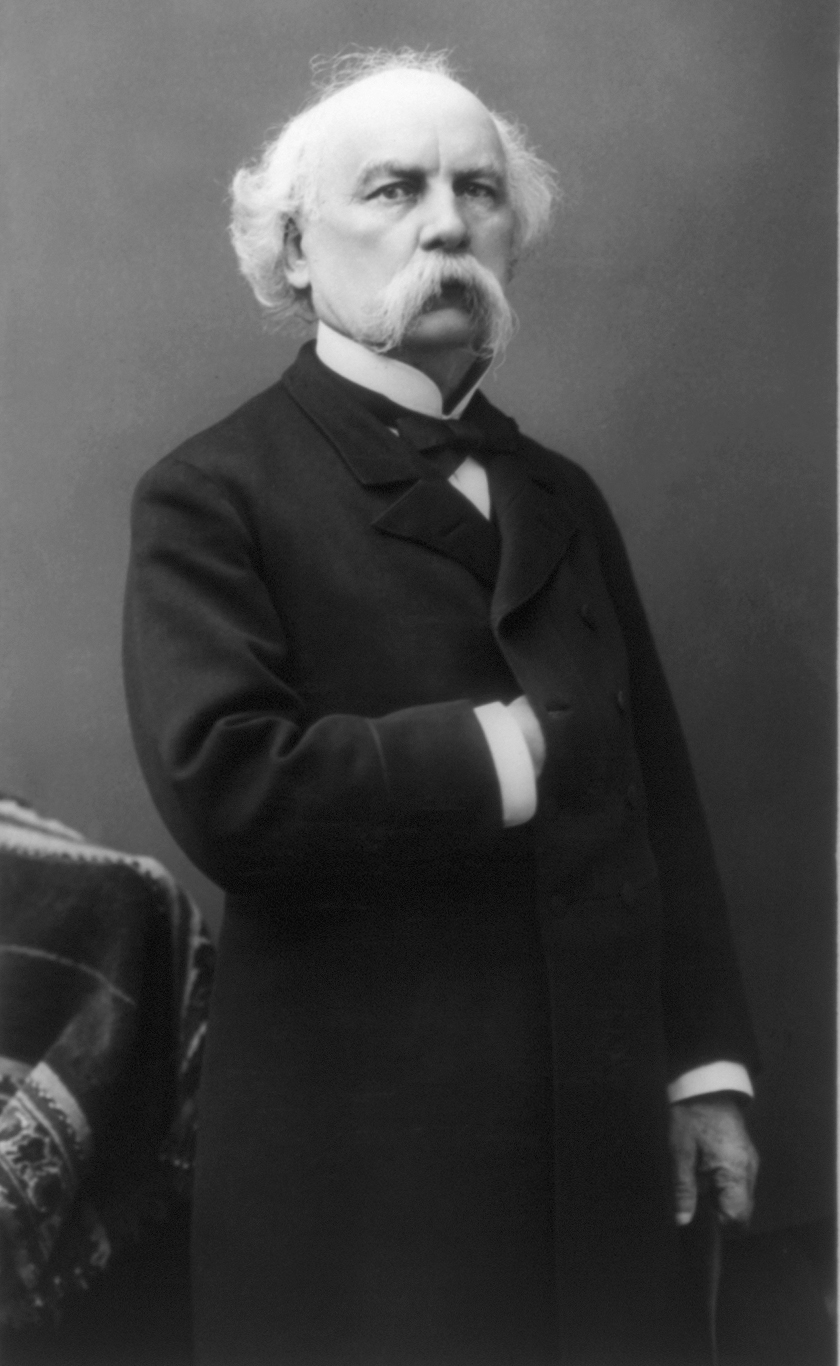

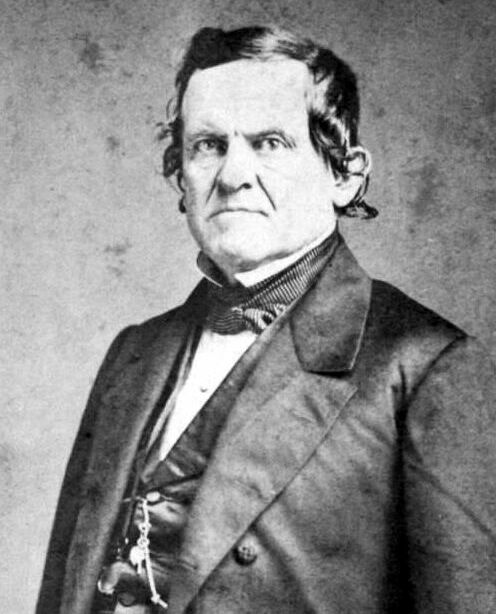

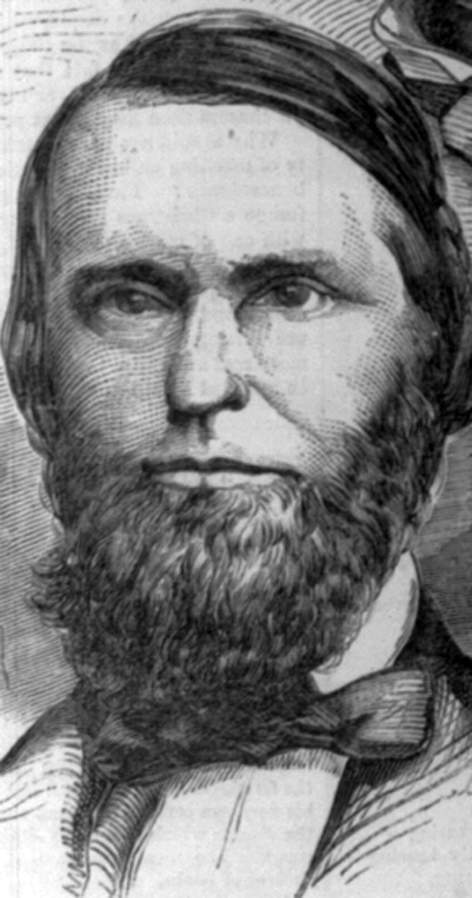

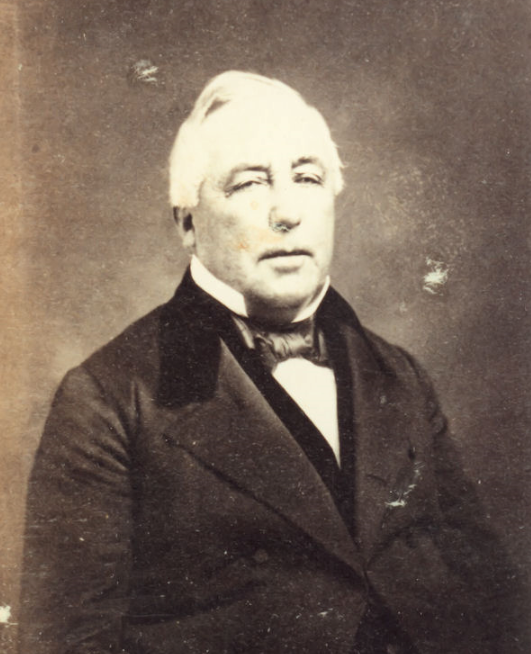
Nominee	John Lawrence Manning	T. N. Dawkins	J. B. Campbell
1st ballot	33 (23.4%)	—	32 (22.7%)
3rd ballot	95 (65.5%)	50 (34.5%)	—
Nominee	William Henry Trescot	Francis Wilkinson Pickens	William W. Boyce
1st ballot	24 (17.0%)	22 (15.6%)	19 (13.5%)
3rd ballot	—	—	—
Nominee	Benjamin Faneuil Dunkin
1st ballot	11 (7.8%)
3rd ballot	—
Senator before election
None (vacant from November 11, 1860)
Elected Senator
John Lawrence Manning (not seated)

Democrat John H. Hammond withdrew from the Senate on November 11, 1860.

The South Carolina General Assembly met in joint session from October 30 to November 1, 1865, to hold a special election for the unexpired term. John Lawrence Manning defeated T. N. Dawkins on the third ballot.

== Tennessee ==
Tennessee held two elections due to the expulsion and resignation of its senators during the Civil War.

=== Tennessee (regular) ===
Tennessee election
- May 4, 1866

Members of the Tennessee General Assembly Majority of voting members needed to win
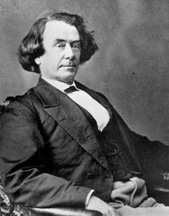

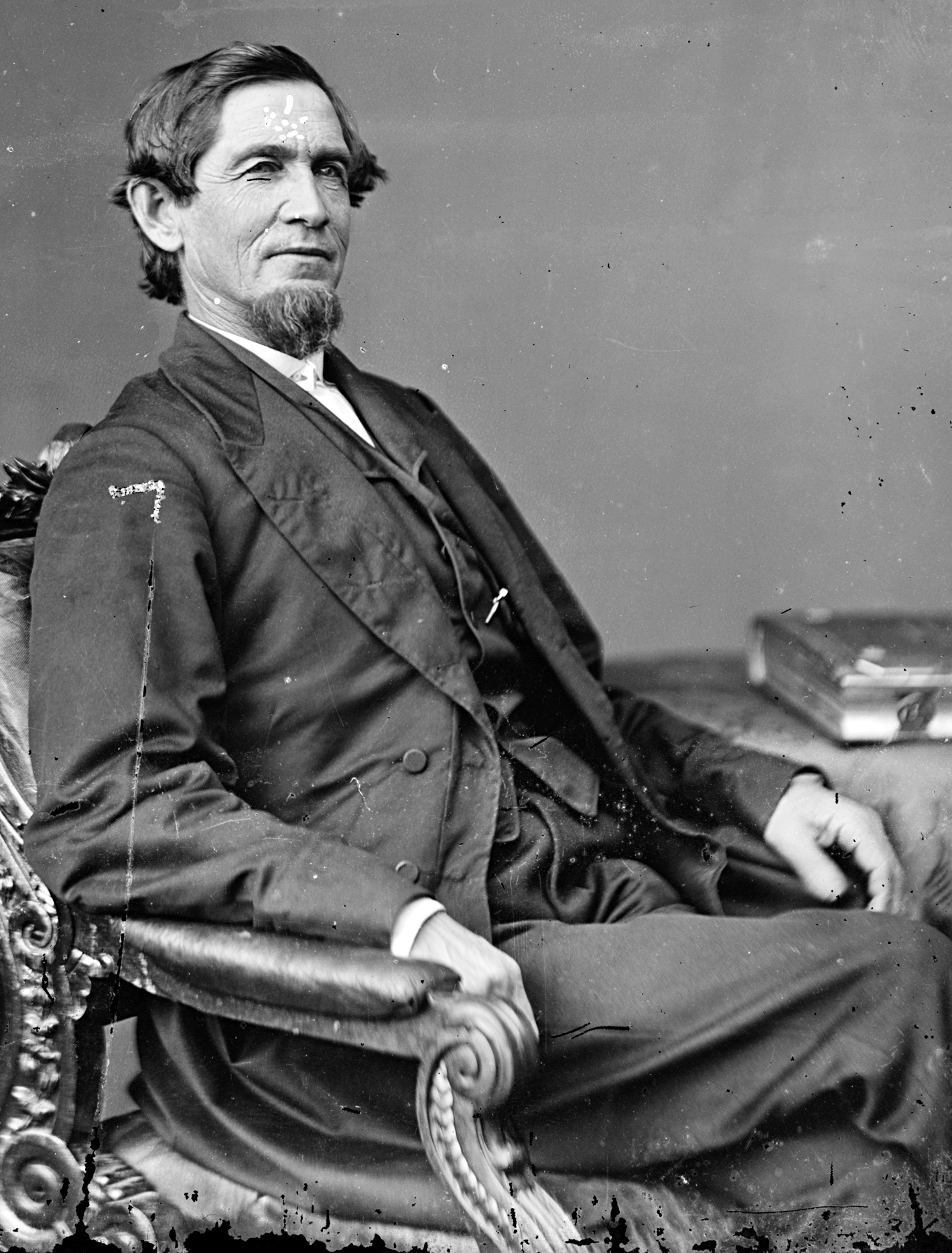

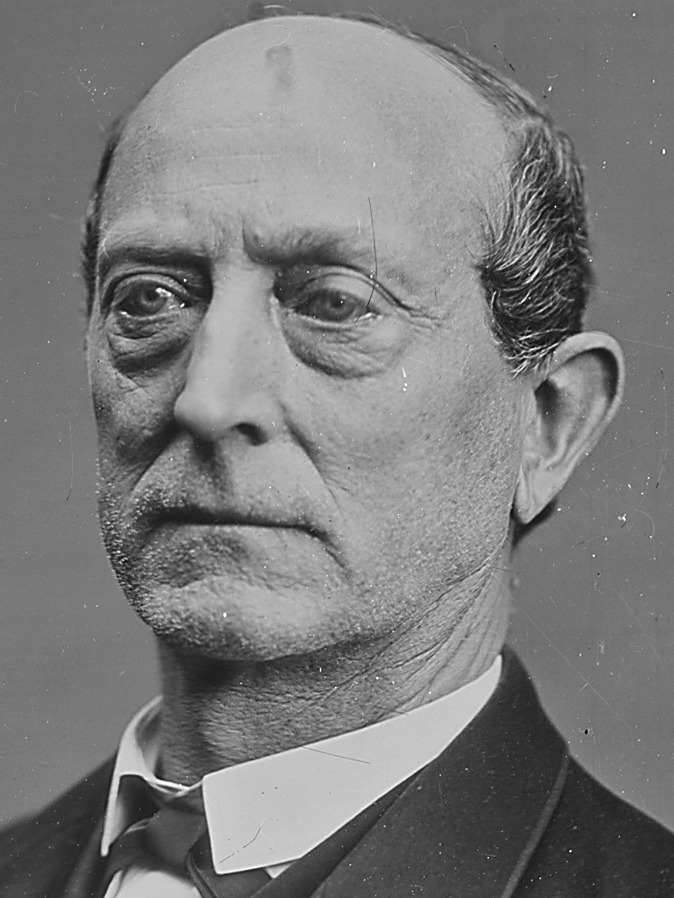

Nominee	Joseph S. Fowler	William H. Wisener	Return J. Meigs III
Party	Radical	Radical
1st ballot	32 (35.2%)	22 (24.2%)	3 (3.3%)
4th ballot	49 (53.8%)	28 (30.8%)	12 (13.2%)
Nominee	J. B. Rodgers	Isaac Roberts Hawkins	William B. Stokes
Party		Radical	Radical
1st ballot	9 (9.9%)	13 (14.3%)	7 (7.7%)
4th ballot	2 (2.2%)	—	—
Nominee	F. B. Fogg
1st ballot	5 (5.5%)
4th ballot	—
Senator before election
None (vacant from July 11, 1861)
Elected Senator
Joseph S. Fowler
Radical

One-term Democrat Alfred O. P. Nicholson was expelled from the Senate on July 11, 1861.

The Tennessee General Assembly met in joint session on May 4, 1865, to hold an election for the next term. Joseph S. Fowler defeated William H. Wisener on the fourth ballot. Both candidates were Radicals; Wisener was endorsed by the leader of the Radical Union Party, Tennessee governor Parson Brownlow.

=== Tennessee (special) ===
Tennessee special election
- May 4, 1866

Members of the Tennessee General Assembly Majority of voting members needed to win
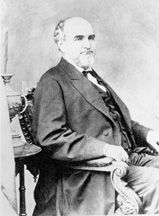

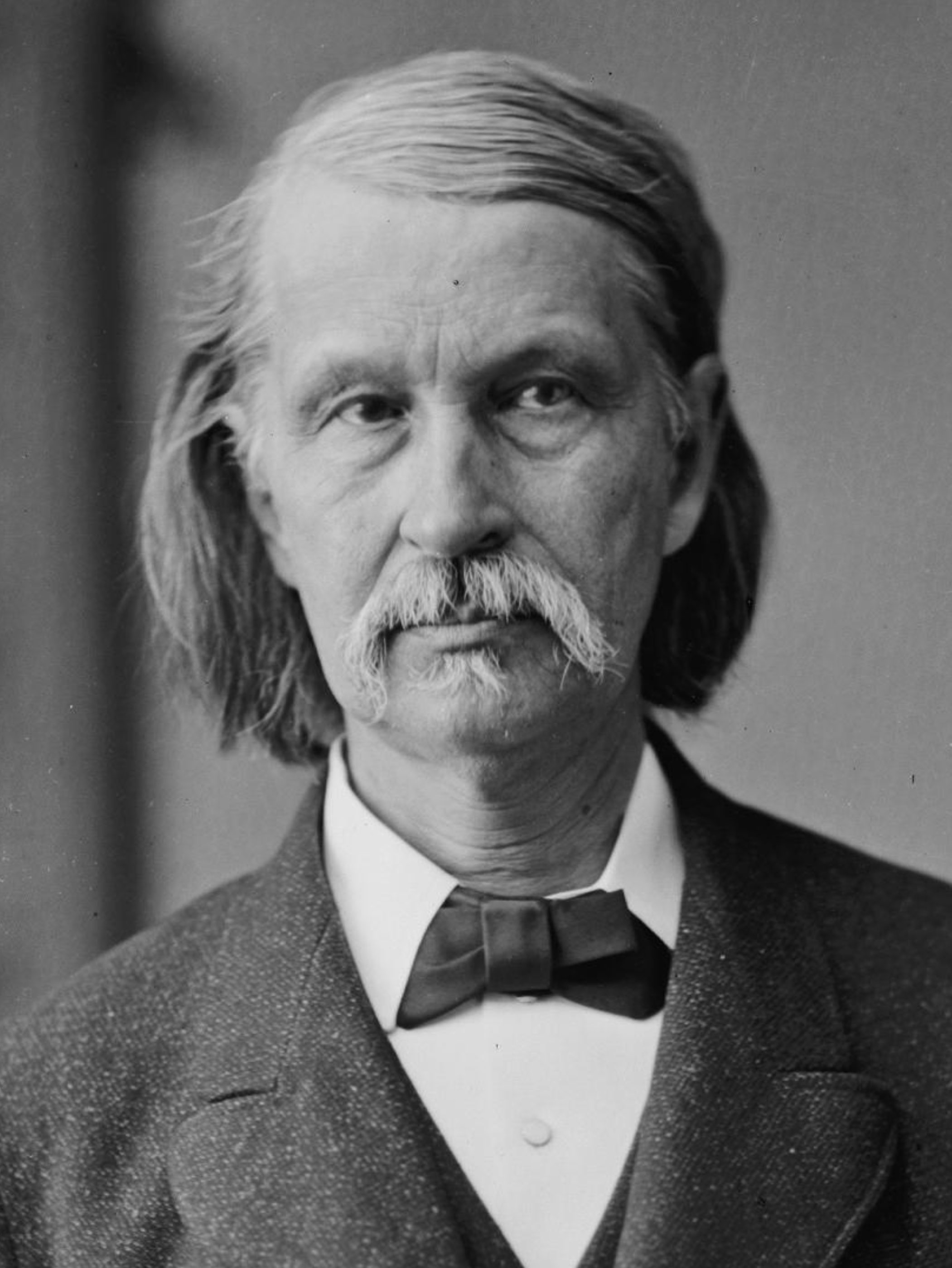

Nominee	David T. Patterson	Horace Maynard	Absalom A. Kyle
Party	Conservative	Radical	Conservative
1st ballot	31 (39.2%)	36 (45.6%)	11 (13.9%)
5th ballot	52 (57.1%)	38 (41.8%)	—
Senator before election
None (vacant from March 4, 1862)
Elected Senator
David T. Patterson
Conservative

Democrat Andrew Johnson resigned from the Senate on March 4, 1862.

The Tennessee General Assembly met in joint session on May 4, 1865, to hold a special election for the unexpired term. Conservative candidate David T. Patterson defeated Radical candidate Horace Maynard on the fifth ballot.

== Texas ==
Texas election
- No election
Senator before election
None (vacant from July 11, 1861)
Elected Senator
None

One-term Democrat John Hemphill was expelled from the Senate on July 11, 1861. The Texas Legislature did not hold an election for the next term, and the seat remained vacant until 1870.

== Virginia ==
Virginia held two elections due to the death of Lemuel J. Bowden. The winners were not seated by the Senate.

=== Virginia (special) ===
Virginia special election
- December 8, 1864

Members of the Restored Virginia General Assembly Majority of voting members needed to win
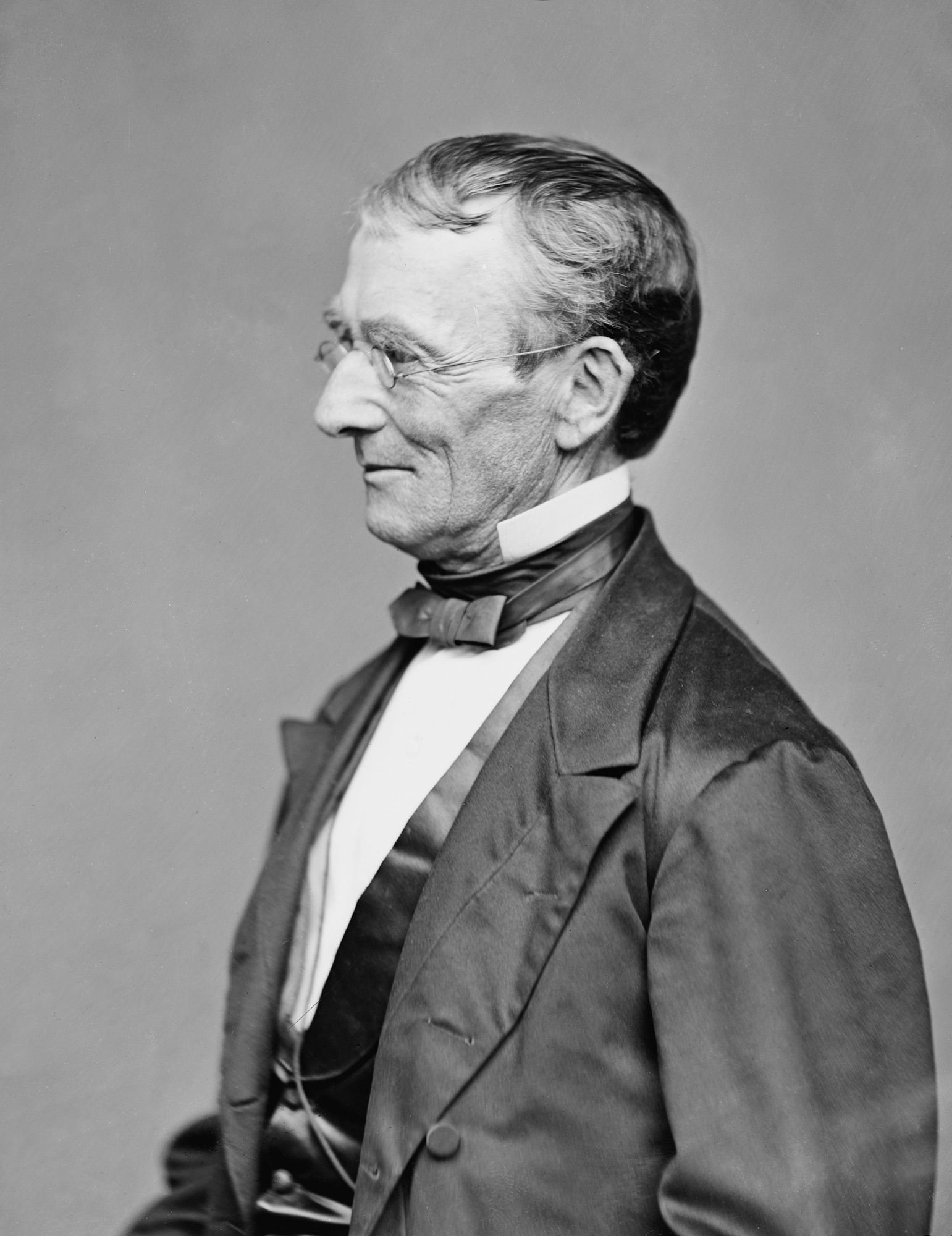

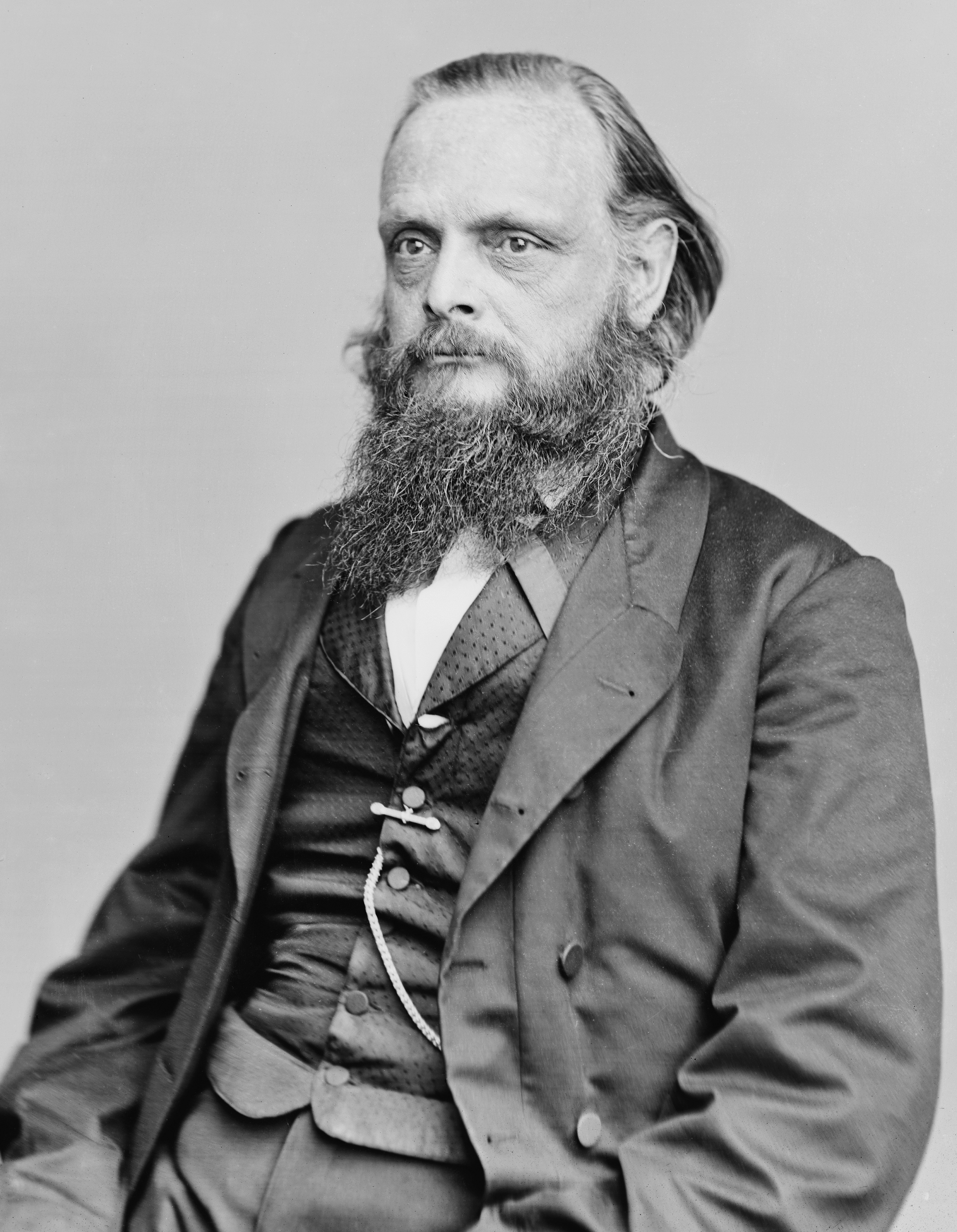

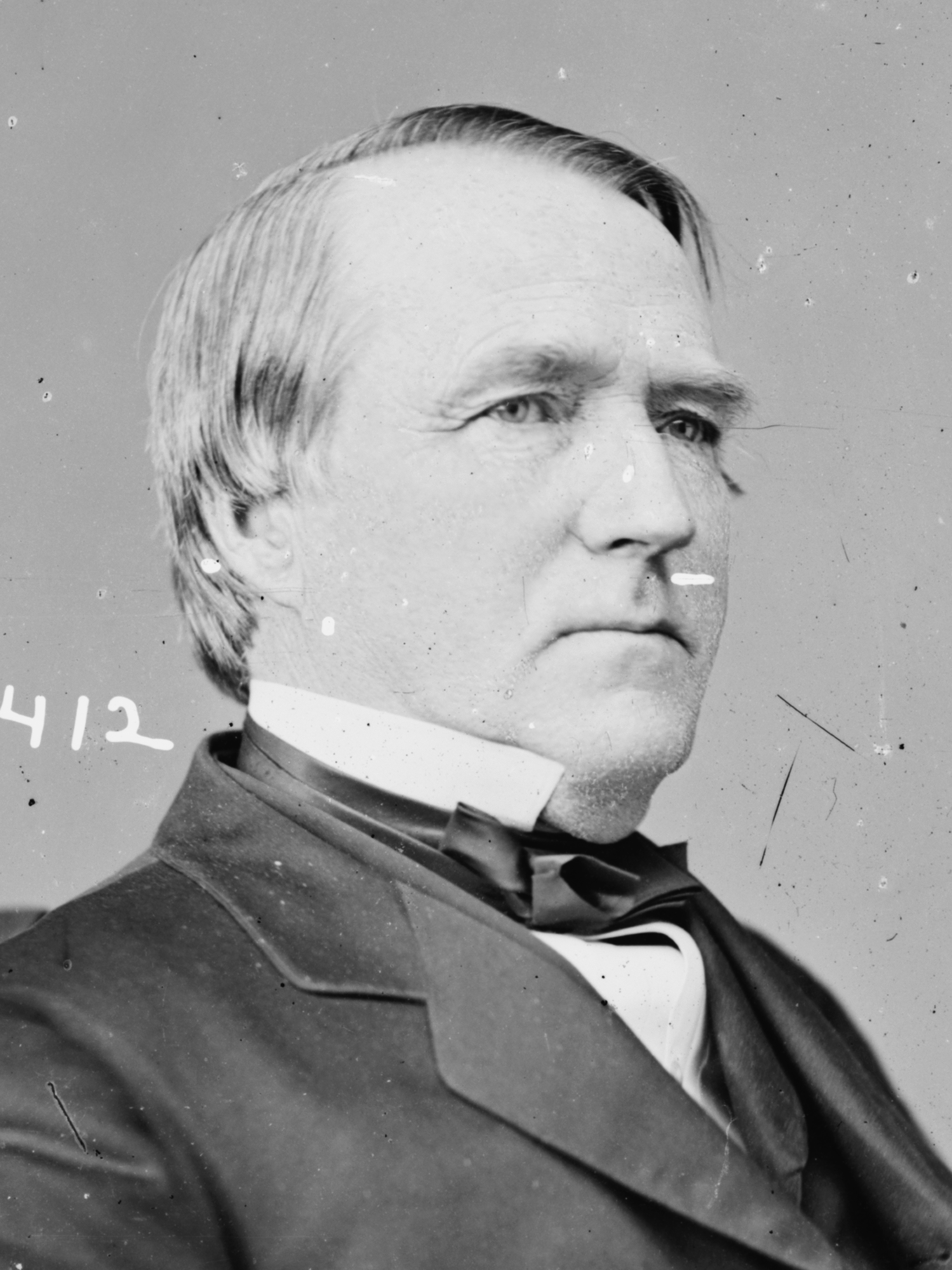
Nominee	Joseph Segar	John Curtiss Underwood
Party	Union	Union
1st ballot	11 (68.8%)	3 (18.8%)
Nominee	S. Ferguson Beach	Lewis McKenzie
Party	Union	Union
1st ballot	1 (6.2%)	1 (6.2%)
Senator before election
Lemuel J. Bowden
Union
Elected Senator
Joseph Segar
Union

Bowden died on January 2, 1864, less than a year into his six-year term.

The Restored Virginia General Assembly met on December 8, 1864, to hold a special election for the unexpired term. Union candidate Joseph Segar defeated John Curtiss Underwood, S. Ferguson Beach, and Lewis McKenzie on the first ballot.

=== Virginia (regular) ===
Virginia election
- December 9, 1864

Members of the Restored Virginia General Assembly Majority of voting members needed to win
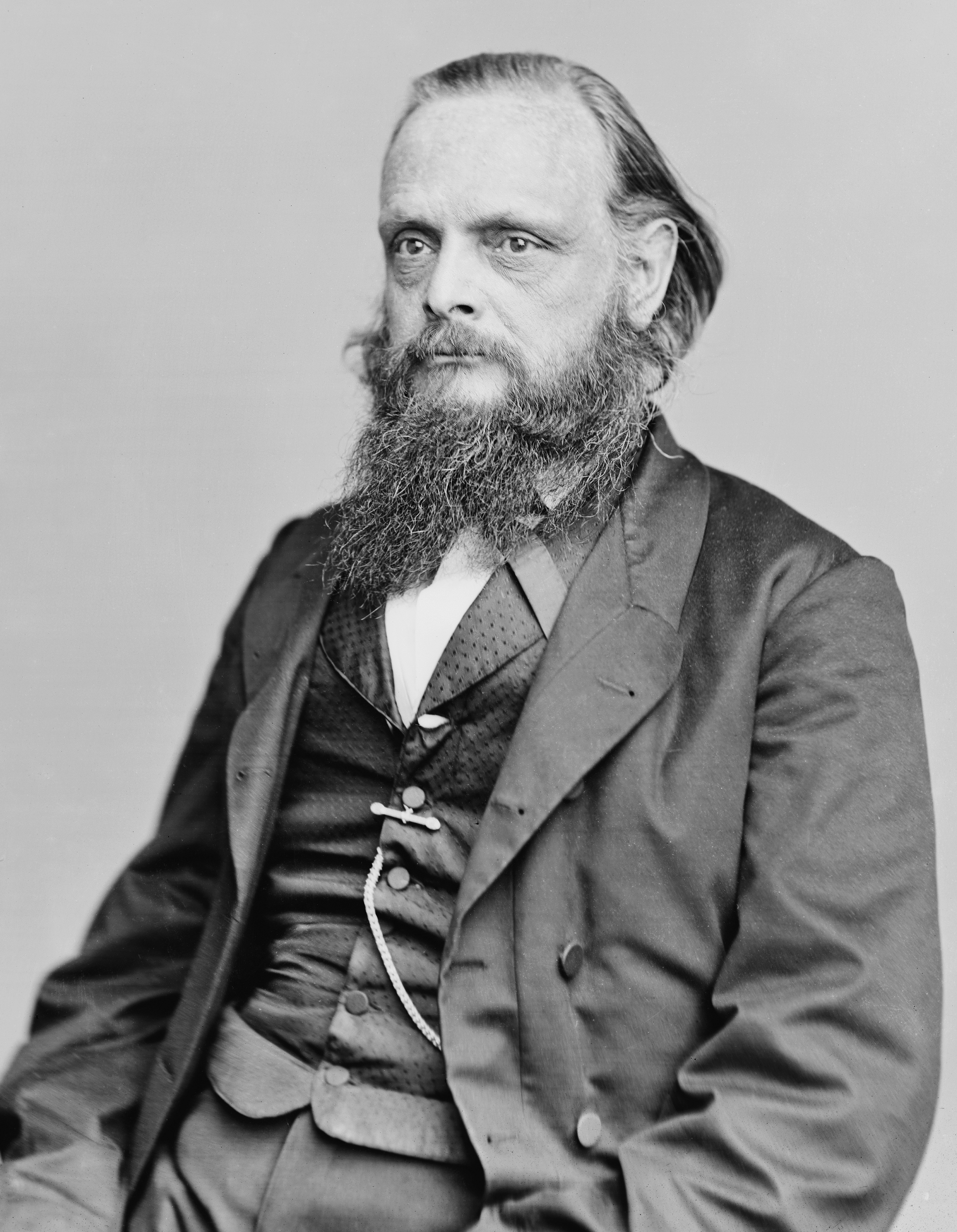

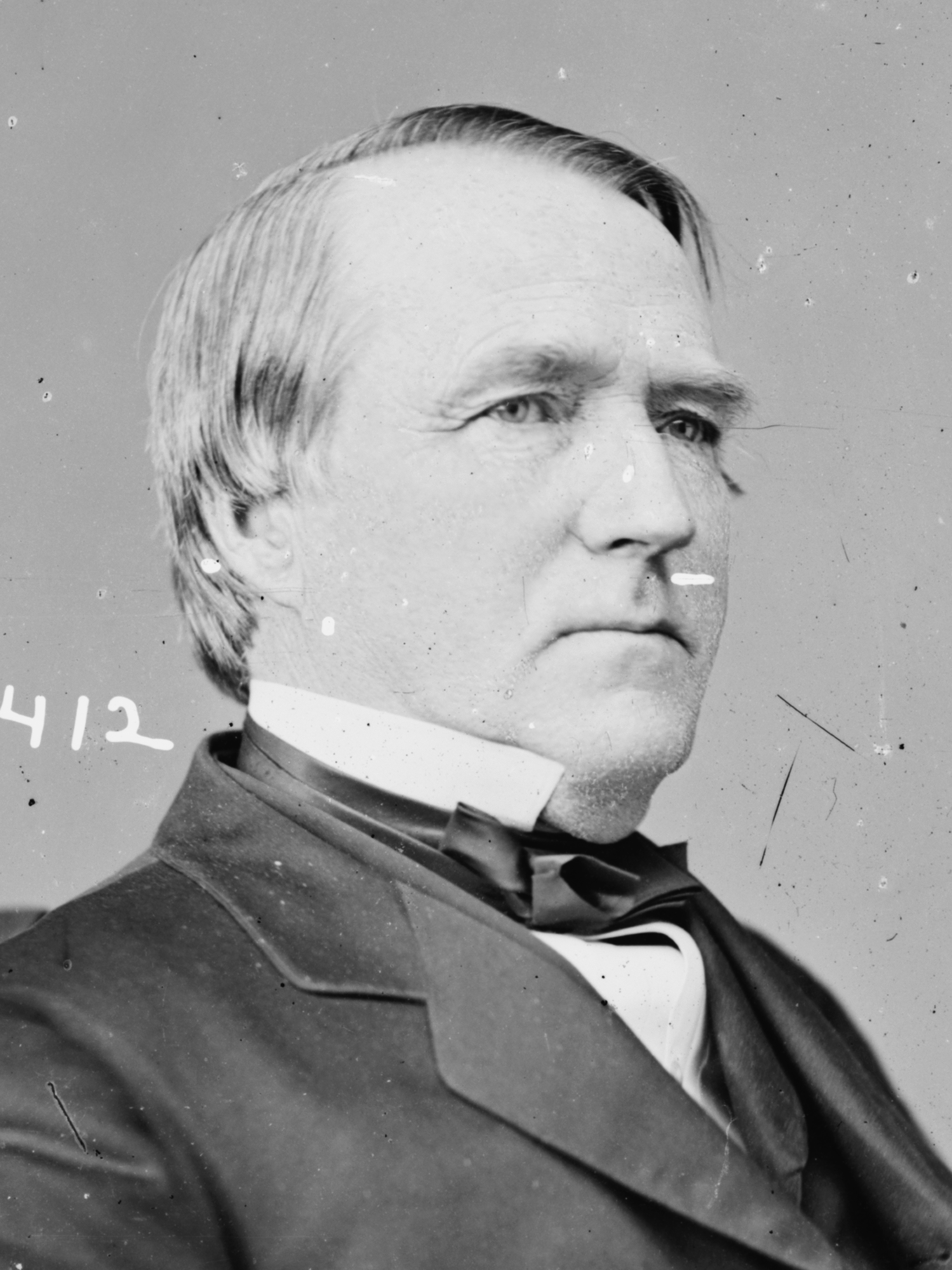
Nominee	John Curtiss Underwood	S. Ferguson Beach	Lewis McKenzie
Party	Union	Union	Union
1st ballot	12 (75.0%)	2 (12.5%)	2 (12.5%)
Senator before election
John S. Carlile
Union
Elected Senator
John Curtiss Underwood
Union

One-term Unionist John S. Carlile was elected in 1861.

The Restored Virginia General Assembly met on December 9, 1864, to hold a special election for the unexpired term. Union candidate John Curtiss Underwood defeated S. Ferguson Beach and Lewis McKenzie on the first ballot.

== West Virginia ==
West Virginia election
- January 31, 1865

Members of the West Virginia Legislature Majority of voting members needed to win
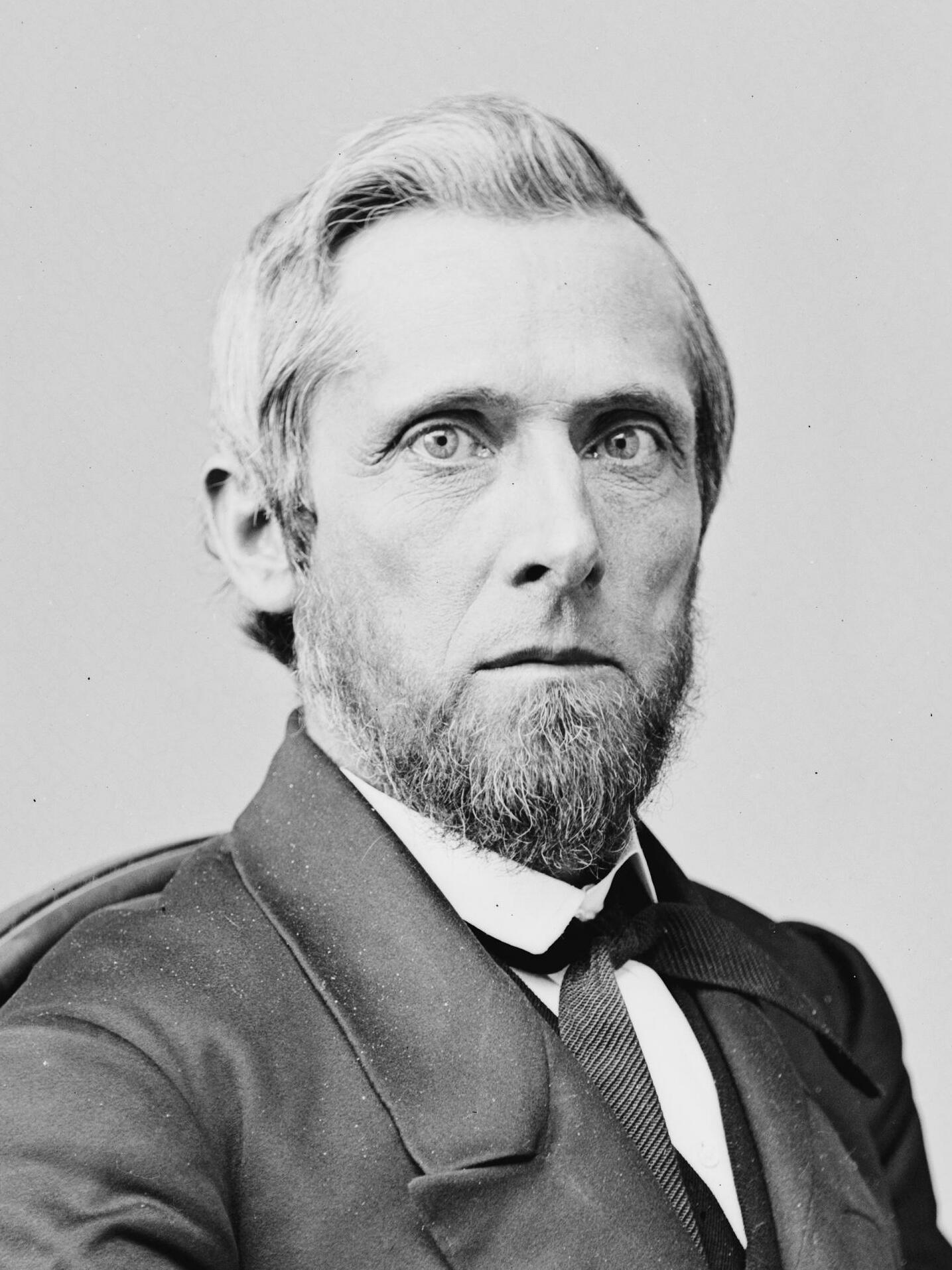

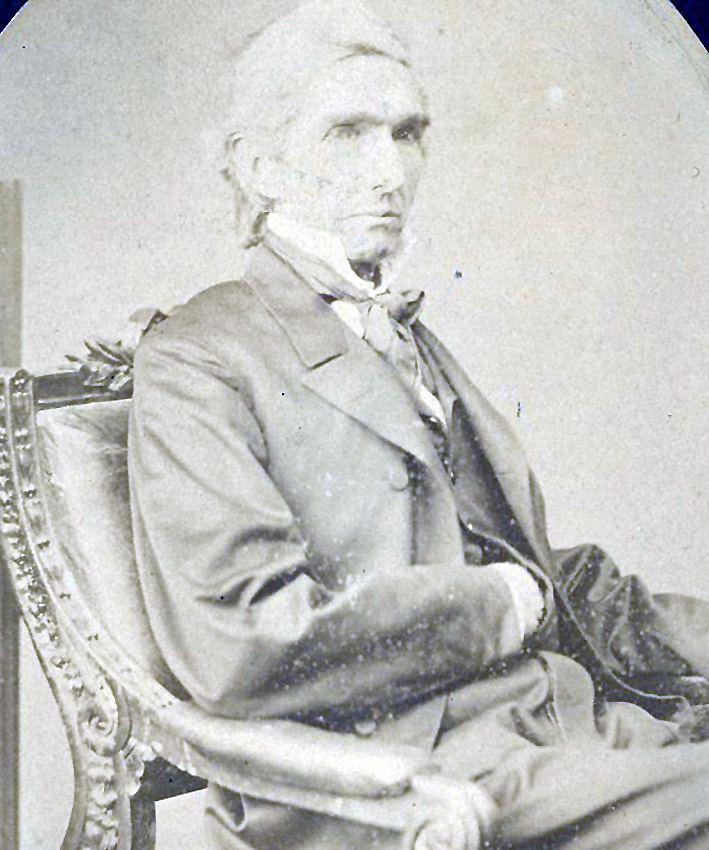
Nominee	Waitman T. Willey	Lee Roy Kramer	Daniel Polsley
Party	Union	Union
1st ballot	53 (76.8%)	7 (10.1%)	6 (8.7%)
Senator before election
Waitman T. Willey
Union
Elected Senator
Waitman T. Willey
Union

One-term Unionist Waitman T. Willey was elected in 1863.

The West Virginia Legislature met on January 31, 1865, to hold an election for the next term. Willey defeated Lee Roy Kramer on the first ballot.

== See also ==
- 1864 United States elections
  - 1864 United States presidential election
  - 1864–65 United States House of Representatives elections
- 38th United States Congress
- 39th United States Congress

== Bibliography ==
=== Primary sources ===
- Alabama (1866). Journal [...] of the House of Representatives [...]. Montgomery.
- Arkansas (1870). Journal of the Senate [...]. Little Rock.
- Evening Journal Almanac (1864). The Evening Journal Almanac: 1864. Albany.
- Evening Journal Almanac (1865). The Evening Journal Almanac: 1865. Albany.
- Florida (1865). Journal of the Proceedings of the House of Representatives. Tallahassee.
- Greeley, Horace, ed. (1863). The Tribune Almanac and Political Register for 1863. New York.
- Greeley, Horace, ed. (1864). The Tribune Almanac and Political Register for 1864. New York.
- Greeley, Horace, ed. (1865). The Tribune Almanac and Political Register for 1865. New York.
- Greeley, Horace, ed. (1866). The Tribune Almanac and Political Register for 1866. New York.
- Hahn, Michael (1865). "Letter of the Governor of the State of Louisiana [...]". Index to the Miscellaneous Documents of the Senate of the United States [...]. Washington.
- Illinois (1865). Journal of the House of Representatives [...]. Springfield.
- Kansas (1865). House Journal [...]. Topeka.
- Kentucky (1865). Journal [...] of the Senate [...]. Frankfurt, KY.
- Maryland (1864). Journal of the Proceedings of the House of Delegates [...]. Annapolis.
- Maryland (1865). Journal of the Proceedings of the House of Delegates [...]. Annapolis.
- Massachusetts (1865). Journal of the House of Representatives [...]. Boston.
- Mississippi (1866). Journal of the Senate [...]. Jackson.
- Nevada (1865). Journal of the Assembly [...]. Carson City.
- New Hampshire (1864). Journal of the Honorable Senate [...]. Concord.
- North Carolina (1865). Journal of the Senate of the General Assembly [...]. Raleigh.
- McPherson, Edward, ed. (1866). A Political Manual for 1866 [...]. Washington D.C.
- Oregon (1864). Journal of the Proceedings of the House [...]. Portland, OR.
- Rhode Island (1864). Acts and Resolves Passed at the May Session of the General Assembly [...]. Providence.
- South Carolina (1865). Journal of the House of Representatives [...]. Columbia.
- Tennessee (1865). House Journal. Nashville.
- Virginia (1865). Journal of the House of Delegates [...]. Alexandria.
- West Virginia (1865). Journal of the House of Delegates [...]. Wheeling.

=== Secondary sources ===
- Alexander, Thomas B. (1950). Political Reconstruction in Tennessee. New York: Russell and Russell.
- Alexander, Thomas B. (1969). "Political Reconstruction in Tennessee, 1865–1870". In Curry, Richard Orr (ed.). Radicalism, Racism, and Party Realignment: The Border States during Reconstruction. Baltimore: Johns Hopkins Press. pp. 37–79.
- Angel, Myron, ed. (1881). History of Nevada. Oakland, CA.
- Baker, Jean H. (1973). The Politics of Continuity: Maryland Political Parties from 1858 to 1870. Baltimore: Johns Hopkins University Press.
- Baum, Dale (1984). The Civil War Party System: The Case of Massachusetts, 1848–1876. Chapel Hill: University of North Carolina Press.
- Blackmar, Frank Wilson (1904). "State of Kansas". In Goodspeed, Weston Arthur (ed.). The Province and the States [...]. Vol. 7. Madison, WI: Western Historical Association.
- Bowers, Michael W. (2013). The Sagebrush State: Nevada's History, Government, and Politics (4th ed.). Reno: University of Nevada Press.
- Clark, Dan Ebert (1912). History of Senatorial Elections in Iowa: A Study in American Politics (PhD thesis). Iowa City: University of Iowa.
- Congressional Quarterly (1985). Congressional Quarterly's Guide to U.S. Elections (2nd ed.). Washington D.C.: Congressional Quarterly. ISBN 978-0-87187-339-2.
- Davis, William Watson (1913). The Civil War and Reconstruction in Florida. New York: Columbia University.
- Dell, Christopher (1975). Lincoln and the War Democrats: The Grand Erosion of Conservative Tradition. Rutherford, NJ: Farleigh Dickenson University Press.
- Foner, Eric (2014). Reconstruction: America's Unfinished Revolution, 1863–77 (Revised ed.). New York: HarperPerennial. ISBN 978-0-06-235451-8.
- Harris, William C. (1967). Presidential Reconstruction in Mississippi. Baton Rouge: Louisiana State University Press.
- Hubbard, Lucius F.; Holcombe, Return I. (1908). Minnesota in Three Centuries. Vol. 3. Mankato, MN: Publishing Society of Minnesota.
- Knapp, Charles Merriam (1924). New Jersey Politics during the Period of Civil War and Reconstruction. Geneva, NY: W. F. Humphrey.
- Maddex, Jack P. Jr. (1970). The Virginia Conservatives, 1869–1879: A Study in Reconstruction Politics. Chapel Hill: University of North Carolina Press.
- May, George S. (1964). Michigan and the Civil War Years, 1860–1866: A Wartime Chronicle. [Lansing]: Michigan Civil War Centennial Observance Commission.
- McPherson, James M. (1988). Battle Cry of Freedom: The Civil War Era. New York: Oxford University.
- National Archives (February 8, 2022). "17th Amendment to the U.S. Constitution: Direct Election of U.S. Senators (1913)". National Archives and Records Administration.
- Rhode Island (1916). Manual, with Rules and Orders, for the Use of the General Assembly [...]. Providence.
- Sewell, Richard H. (1965). John P. Hale and the Politics of Abolition. Cambridge: Harvard University Press.
- Socolofsky, Homer E. (2001). Kansas Governors. Lawrence: University Press of Kansas. ISBN 978-0-7006-3170-4.
- Summers, Mark W. (Winter 1983). "The Moderates' Last Chance: The Louisiana Election of 1865". Louisiana History. 24 (1): 49–69.
- Taft, George S.; Furber, George P.; Buck, George M., eds. (1903). Compilation of Senate Election Cases from 1789 to 1885. Washington, D.C.: Government Printing Office.
- Wilder, Daniel W. (1875). The Annals of Kansas. Topeka.
- Woodward, Walter Carleton (1913). The Rise and Early History of Political Parties in Oregon, 1843–1868. Portland, OR: J. K. Gill Company.
