= 1860–61 United States Senate elections =

- January 14, 1860– April 2, 1861 (Note: One seat (Kentucky) was previously elected on December 12, 1859. Special elections were held in Virginia (July 9, 1861,) and Kentucky (December 10, 1861,) following the start of the 37th Congress.)
- Class 3

31 (Note: Includes late elections) of the 68 seats in the United States Senate 35 seats needed for a majority
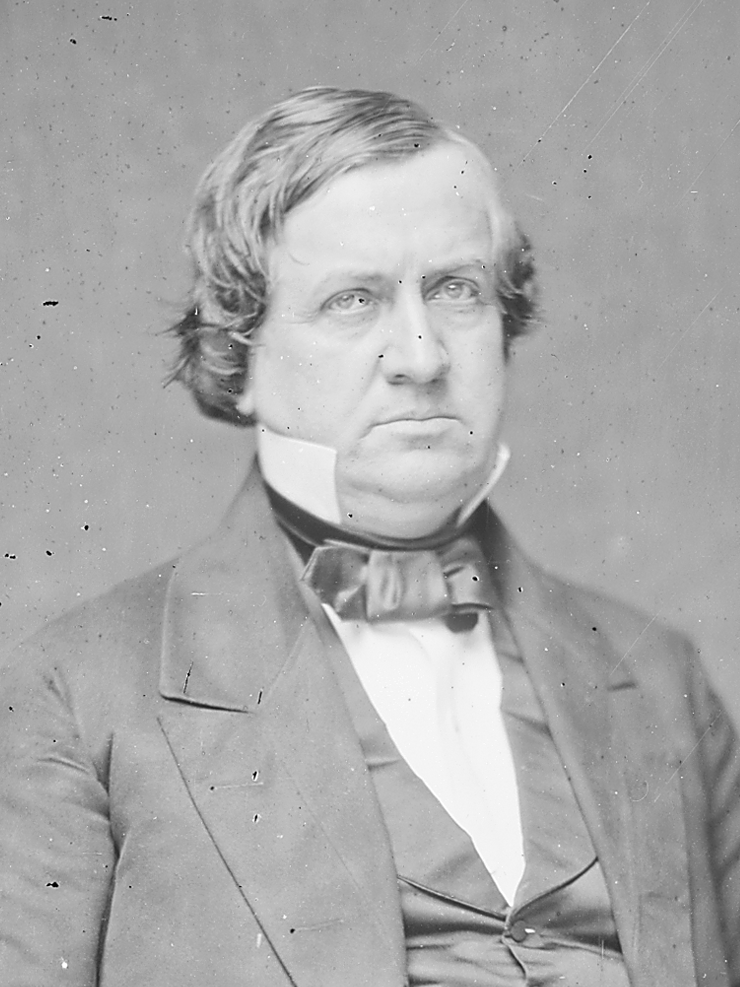
	Majority party	Minority party
	Dem
Leader	No formal leadership	John P. Hale (Note: As chairman of the Senate Republican Conference)
Party	Democratic	Republican
Leader's seat	N/A	New Hampshire
Seats before	38	25
Seats won	31(15) (Note: Including 2 Douglas Democrats, 1 Breckinridge Democrat, and 1 Lecompton Democrat. Democrats lost an additional 16 seats as a result of secession, reducing their caucus to 15 seats.)	31
Seat change	▼8	▲6
Seats up	15	9
Races won	7	15
	Third party
Party	Know Nothing
Seats before	2
Seats won	1
Seat change	▼1
Seats up	1
Races won	0
- Results; Democratic gain Republican gain Democratic hold Republican hold

The 1860–61 United States Senate elections were held from January 14, 1860, to April 2, 1861. Regularly scheduled elections were held for 23 out of the 68 seats in the United States Senate, and special elections were held in California, Oregon, Maine, Pennsylvania, and Ohio. One seat was previously elected on December 12, 1859. Following the start of the 37th Congress on July 4, 1861, special elections were held in Virginia and Kentucky to fill vacancies resulting from the secession of the Confederacy. The Republican Party flipped six Democratic-held seats and gained control of the Senate for the first time following the departure of senators representing Confederate states.

U.S. senators are divided into three classes whose six-year terms are staggered, such that one-third of the Senate is elected every two years. Senators in Class 3 were elected in 1860 and 1861. Prior to ratification of the Seventeenth Amendment in 1913, senators were elected by the U.S. state legislatures. There was no fixed calendar, and states held elections on various dates preceding the first session of Congress. In states with split partisan control of the legislature, multiple rounds of voting could be required to elect a senator, leading to extended vacancies.

Republicans flipped Democratic-held seats in Indiana, Ohio, Oregon, and Pennsylvania and added two seats representing the new state of Kansas, swelling their caucus to 31 senators. The Democrats flipped a Know Nothing-held seat in Kentucky, but lost five seats from states that seceded before the end of the 36th Congress; the departure of 16 more Southern senators before July 4 reduced the Democratic caucus to 15 seats. In special elections held after the start of Congress, Unionists filled two vacancies in Virginia and flipped a Democratic-held seat in Kentucky, reducing the Democratic caucus to 14 seats by the end of 1861.

The Republican victory in the 1860 United States presidential election precipitated the resignations of senators Hannibal Hamlin of Maine, Simon Cameron of Pennsylvania, and Salmon P. Chase of Ohio, who became vice president, secretary of war, and secretary of the treasury, respectively, in the incoming Lincoln administration; Republicans won all three special elections to select their replacements. Other notable departures included William H. Seward of New York, who retired in order to accept an appointment as secretary of state; Stephen A. Douglas, who died on June 3, 1861, and was replaced by a Republican appointee; John C. Breckinridge, who was expelled from the Senate in December 1861 after enlisting in the Confederate States Army; and Joseph Lane of Oregon, whose seat was filled by a Douglas Democrat.

== Background ==
The elections took place amidst rising sectional tension over slavery and the related issue of territorial expansion. In the previous Congress, the debate on the proposed Lecompton Constitution and the application of the Dred Scott decision split the Democratic Party between allies of Stephen A. Douglas, who opposed the measures, and the administration of James Buchanan. Douglas was nominated for president by his supporters in 1860, while the Buchanan wing consisting of most Southern Democrats and doughfaces coalesced behind the outgoing vice president and senator-elect from Kentucky, John C. Breckinridge. In California, Missouri, and Oregon, vote-splitting between Douglas and Breckinridge Democrats resulted in gridlock that persisted over multiple rounds of balloting. Republicans were the beneficiaries of Democratic infighting, picking up an open seat in Oregon and using their influence to elect a Douglas Democrat over his Breckinridge Democratic opponent in California.

In the slave states, the opposition to the Democrats was fragmented and generally lacked sufficient numbers to threaten Democratic senators. Of the five slave states to hold regularly scheduled elections, only in Missouri was there a protracted struggle over the selection of the state's senator. In Maryland the Know Nothings were the second party in the legislature, and in North Carolina the Whig label was revived; elsewhere the opponents of the Democrats were called Oppositionists or Constitutional Unionists. These groups subsequently would join forces with unionist Democrats and Republicans in Union coalitions that resisted secession in the Upper South and border states during and after 1861.

== Summary results ==
Parties						Total
Parties	Democratic	Republican	Know Nothing	Union	Vacant	Total
Last elections (1858–59)	38	25	2	—	1	66
Not up	23	16	1	—	—	40
Class 1 (1856–57→1862–63)	10	8	1	—	—	19
Class 2 (1858–59→1864–65)	13	8	—	—	—	21
Up	15	9	1 (Note: Includes the Kentucky Class 3 seat. Democrat John C. Breckinridge won the regularly scheduled election for this seat in 1859 but was subsequently expelled from the Senate, triggering a special election held in 1861.)	—	3	28
Class 3 (1854–55→1860–61)	14 (Note: Includes the Ohio Class 3 seat. Republican Salmon P. Chase won the regularly scheduled election for this seat in 1860 but subsequently resigned, triggering a special election held in 1861.)	7	1	—	—	22
Special: Class 1 & 2	1	2	—	—	1	4
Special: Class 3	—	1	—	—	—	1
New states	—	—	—	—	2 (Note: Kansas)	2
General election
1859	—	—	1	—	—	1
Replaced by other party	▼1 Know Nothing replaced by ▲1 Democrat					1
Result	1	—	—	—	—	1
1860	5	4	—	—	—	9
Held by same party	3	4	—	—	—	7
Replaced by other party	▼1 Democrat replaced by ▲1 Republican ▼1 Democrat replaced by ▲1 vacancy					2
Result	3	5	—	—	1 (Note: South Carolina)	9
1861	9	3	—	—	2	14
Held by same party	3	3	—	—	—	6
Replaced by other party	▼4 Democrats replaced by ▲4 vacancies ▼2 Democrats replaced by ▲2 Republicans ▼2 vacancies replaced by ▲2 Republicans					8
Result	3	7	—	—	4 (Note: Alabama, Florida, Georgia, and Louisiana)	14
Special elections
1860	1	—	—	—	1	2
Held by same party	1	—	—	—	—	1
Replaced by other party	▼1 vacancy replaced by ▲1 Republican					1
Result	1	1	—	—	—	2
1861	—	3	—	—	—	3
Held by same party	—	3	—	—	—	3
Result	—	3	—	—	—	3
Secession
Before March 4, 1861	9	—	—	—	—	9
Replaced by other party	▼9 Democrats replaced by ▲9 vacancies					9
Result	—	—	—	—	9	9
After March 4, 1861	8	—	—	—	—	8
Held by same party	1	—	—	—	—	1
Replaced by other party	▼7 Democrats replaced by ▲7 vacancies					7
Result	1	—	—	—	7	8
Result	15	31	1	—	21	68
Changes after July 4, 1861	▼1	Steady	Steady	▲3	▼2	68

== Maps ==
Elections held in 1859

Elections held in 1860

Elections held from January 1–July 3, 1861

Special elections held after July 4, 1861

== Change in composition ==
Each block represents one of the 66 seats in the U.S. Senate. (The admission of Kansas on January 29, 1861, increased the number of seats in the Senate to 68.) "KN_{#}" is a Know Nothing senator, "D_{#}" is a Democratic senator, "R_{#}" is a Republican senator, "U_{#}" is a Union senator, and "V_{#}" is a vacant seat. They are arranged so that the parties are separated, and a majority is clear by crossing the middle.

=== Before the elections ===
This diagram shows the composition of the Senate on January 1, 1860.

D_{3}	D_{2}	D_{1}							
D_{4}	D_{5}	D_{6}	D_{7}	D_{8}	D_{9}	D_{10}	D_{11}	D_{12}	D_{13}
D_{23}	D_{22}	D_{21}	D_{20}	D_{19}	D_{18}	D_{17}	D_{16}	D_{15}	D_{14}
D_{24} Md. Ran	D_{25} Mo. Ran	D_{26} N.C. Ran	D_{27} Ohio Ran	D_{28} Ark. Retired	D_{29} Calif. (reg) Retired	D_{30} Calif. (sp) Retired	D_{31} Ind. Retired	D_{32} Ore. (reg) Retired	D_{33} Pa. Retired
Majority →									D_{34} Ala. Withdrew
R_{23} Vt. Ran	R_{24} N.Y. Retired	R_{25} Wis. Retired	KN_{1}	KN_{2} Ky. Retired	D_{38} S.C. Withdrew	D_{37} La. Withdrew	D_{36} Ga. Withdrew	D_{35} Fla. Withdrew	D_{34} Ala. Withdrew
R_{22} N.H. Ran	R_{21} Iowa Ran	R_{20} Ill. Ran	R_{19} Conn. Ran	R_{18}	R_{17}	R_{16}	R_{15}	R_{14}	R_{13}
R_{3}	R_{4}	R_{5}	R_{6}	R_{7}	R_{8}	R_{19}	R_{10}	R_{11}	R_{12}
R_{2}	R_{1}	V_{1} Ore. (sp)							

=== After the elections ===
This diagram shows the projected composition of the Senate as a result of the regularly scheduled elections for the Class III seats and special elections in California and Oregon. In consequence of secession, several more seats had been vacated by the time the 37th United States Congress convened, as shown below.

D_{1}	V_{3} Ga. D Loss	V_{2} Fla. D Loss	V_{1} Ala. D Loss						
D_{2}	D_{3}	D_{4}	D_{5}	D_{6}	D_{7}	D_{8}	D_{9}	D_{10}	D_{11}
D_{21}	D_{20}	D_{19}	D_{18}	D_{17}	D_{16}	D_{15}	D_{14}	D_{13}	D_{12}
D_{22}	D_{23}	D_{24} Ark. Hold	D_{25} Calif. (reg) Hold	D_{26} Calif. (sp) Hold	D_{27} Ky. Gain	D_{28} Md. Re-elected	D_{29} Mo. Hold	D_{30} N.C. Re-elected	D_{31} Ore. (reg) Hold
No majority
R_{23} Kan. Gain	R_{24} Kan. Gain	R_{25} N.H. Re-elected	R_{26} N.Y. Hold	R_{27} Ohio Gain	R_{28} Ore. (sp) Gain	R_{29} Pa. Gain	R_{30} Vt. Re-elected	R_{31} Wis. Hold	KN_{1}
R_{22} Iowa Re-elected	R_{21} Ind. Gain	R_{20} Ill. Re-elected	R_{19} Conn. Re-elected	R_{18}	R_{17}	R_{16}	R_{15}	R_{14}	R_{13}
R_{3}	R_{4}	R_{5}	R_{6}	R_{7}	R_{8}	R_{9}	R_{10}	R_{11}	R_{12}
R_{2}	R_{1}	V_{5} S.C. D Loss	V_{4} La. D Loss						

=== Beginning of the first session ===
This diagram shows the composition of the Senate on July 11, 1861, after the start of the first session, following the withdrawal or expulsion of 16 senators from states which had seceded from the Union between Election Day (November 8, 1860,) and the opening of Congress on July 4. Special elections held in Pennsylvania, Maine, and Ohio filled three vacancies which had occurred on or before March 4; a final vacancy, occurring as a result of the death of Stephen A. Douglas of Illinois, was filled by appointment pending a special election.

V_{4}	V_{3}	V_{2}	V_{1}						
V_{5}	V_{6} Ala. D Loss	V_{7} Ark. D Loss	V_{8} Ark. D Loss	V_{9} Fla. D Loss	V_{10} Ga. D Loss	V_{11} La. D Loss	D_{1}	D_{2}	D_{3}
D_{13}	D_{12}	D_{11}	D_{10}	D_{9}	D_{8}	D_{7}	D_{6}	D_{5}	D_{4}
D_{14}	KN_{1}	R_{32} Pa. (sp) Hold	R_{31} Ohio (sp) Hold	R_{30} Maine (sp) Hold	R_{29} Ill. (ap); Gain	R_{28}	R_{27}	R_{26}	R_{25}
Majority →									R_{24}
R_{15}	R_{16}	R_{17}	R_{18}	R_{19}	R_{20}	R_{21}	R_{22}	R_{23}	R_{24}
R_{14}	R_{13}	R_{12}	R_{11}	R_{10}	R_{9}	R_{8}	R_{7}	R_{6}	R_{5}
V_{16} S.C. D Loss	V_{17} Tenn. D Loss	V_{18} Texas; D Loss	V_{19} Texas; D Loss	V_{20} Va. D Loss	V_{21} Va. D Loss	R_{1}	R_{2}	R_{3}	R_{4}
V_{15} N.C. D Loss	V_{14} N.C. D Loss	V_{13} Miss. D Loss	V_{12} Miss. D Loss						

=== Beginning of the second session ===
This diagram shows the composition of the Senate on December 10, 1861, after the start of the second session, following special elections held in Kentucky and Virginia to fill vacancies resulting from the expulsion of pro-Confederate senators; a final vacancy, occurring from the death of Edward D. Baker, was filled by appointment pending a special election.

V_{4}	V_{3}	V_{2}	V_{1}						
V_{5}	V_{6}	V_{7}	V_{8}	V_{9}	V_{10}	D_{1}	D_{2}	D_{3}	D_{4}
D_{14} Ore. (ap) Gain	D_{13}	D_{12}	D_{11}	D_{10}	D_{9}	D_{8}	D_{7}	D_{6}	D_{5}
KN_{1}	U_{1} Ky. (sp) Gain	U_{2} Va. (sp) Gain	U_{3} Va. (sp) Gain	R_{31}	R_{30}	R_{29}	R_{28}	R_{27}	R_{26}
Majority →									R_{25}
R_{16}	R_{17}	R_{18}	R_{19}	R_{20}	R_{21}	R_{22}	R_{23}	R_{24}	R_{25}
R_{15}	R_{14}	R_{13}	R_{12}	R_{11}	R_{10}	R_{9}	R_{8}	R_{7}	R_{6}
V_{15}	V_{16}	V_{17}	V_{18}	V_{19}	R_{1}	R_{2}	R_{3}	R_{4}	R_{5}
V_{14}	V_{13}	V_{12}	V_{11}						

Key:

KN_{#}	Know Nothing
D_{#}	Democratic
R_{#}	Republican
U_{#}	Union
V_{#}	Vacant

== Race summary ==
=== Special elections during the preceding Congress ===
Special elections were held between January 14, 1860, and January 9, 1861, to fill three vacancies in the 36th United States Congress.

State	Incumbent			This race	
State	Senator	Party	Electoral history	Results	Candidates
California (Class 1)	Henry P. Haun	Democratic	1859 (app.)	Interim appointee retired. New member elected January 14, 1860. Democratic hold.	First ballot (January 14, 1860): ▌ ✓ Milton Latham (Lecompton Democratic) 97; ▌Edward Randolph (Anti-Lecompton Democratic) 14; ▌Oscar L. Shafter (Republican) 3
Oregon (Class 2)	Vacant (legislature failed to elect)			Seat vacant since March 4, 1859. New member elected October 2, 1860. Republican gain.	Fourteenth ballot (October 2, 1860): ▌ ✓ Edward D. Baker (Republican) 26; ▌George H. Williams (Douglas Democratic) 20; ▌George L. Curry (Breckinridge Democratic) 2; ▌Lansing Stout (Breckinridge Democratic) 1; Blank 1
Maine (Class 1)	Hannibal Hamlin	Republican	1848 (sp.); 1851; 1857 (r.); 1857	Incumbent resigned January 7, 1861. New member elected January 9, 1861. Republican hold.	First ballot (January 9, 1861): ▌ ✓ Lot M. Morrill (Republican) 124 H; 29 S; ▌George F. Shepley (Democratic) 23 H; 0 S

=== Elections leading to the next Congress ===
Eighteen senators were elected for the term beginning March 4, 1861.

State	Incumbent			This race	
State	Senator	Party	Electoral history	Results	Candidates
Alabama	Benjamin Fitzpatrick	Democratic	1848 (app.); 1849 (ret.); 1853 (app.); 1853 (sp.); 1855	No election. Democratic loss.	None.
Arkansas	Robert W. Johnson	Democratic	1853 (app.); 1854 (sp.); 1855	Incumbent retired. Democratic hold.	Ninth ballot (December 20, 1860): ▌Charles B. Mitchel (Democratic) 52; ▌Samuel H. Hempstead (Democratic) 26; ▌George C. Watkins (Democratic) 8; ▌Robert W. Johnson (Democratic) 2; Scattering 5
California	William M. Gwin	Democratic	1850; 1855 (f.); 1857 (sp.)	Incumbent retired. Democratic hold.	Twenty-third ballot (April 2, 1861): ▌ ✓ James A. McDougall (DD–A-L) 57; ▌John Nugent (DD–L) 39; ▌John B. Weller (Breckinridge Democratic) 4; Scattering 2
Connecticut	Lafayette S. Foster	Republican	1854	Incumbent re-elected.	First ballot (May 10, 1860): ▌ ✓ Lafayette S. Foster (Republican) 139 H; 16 S; ▌William W. Eaton (Democratic) 70 H; 7 S
Florida	David L. Yulee	Democratic	1855	No election. Democratic loss.	None.
Georgia	Alfred Iverson	Democratic	1854–55	No election. Democratic loss.	None.
Illinois	Lyman Trumbull	Republican	1855	Incumbent re-elected.	First ballot (January 10, 1861): ▌ ✓ Lyman Trumbull (Republican) 54; ▌Samuel S. Marshall (Democratic) 46
Indiana	Graham N. Fitch	Democratic	1857 (sp.)	Incumbent retired. Republican gain.	First ballot (January 16, 1861): ▌ ✓ Henry S. Lane (Republican) 88; ▌Joseph A. Wright (Democratic) 57
Iowa	James Harlan	Republican	1855; 1857 (inv.); 1857 (sp.)	Incumbent re-elected.	First ballot (January 14, 1860): ▌ ✓ James Harlan (Republican) 73; ▌Augustus C. Dodge (Democratic) 52
Kansas (2 seats)	None (new state)			Seat created January 29, 1861. Republican gain.	First ballot (April 4, 1861): ▌ ✓ James H. Lane (Republican) 55; ▌ ✓ Samuel C. Pomeroy (Republican) 52; ▌Marcus J. Parrott (Republican) 49; ▌Frederick P. Stanton (Republican) 21; ▌A. J. Isacks (Democratic) 11; ▌Samuel A. Kingman (Republican) 3; ▌Mark W. Delahay (Republican) 2; Scattering 2
Kansas (2 seats)	None (new state)			Seat created January 29, 1861. Republican gain.	First ballot (April 4, 1861): ▌ ✓ James H. Lane (Republican) 55; ▌ ✓ Samuel C. Pomeroy (Republican) 52; ▌Marcus J. Parrott (Republican) 49; ▌Frederick P. Stanton (Republican) 21; ▌A. J. Isacks (Democratic) 11; ▌Samuel A. Kingman (Republican) 3; ▌Mark W. Delahay (Republican) 2; Scattering 2
Kentucky	John J. Crittenden	Know Nothing	1816; 1819 (r.); 1835; 1841 (ret.); 1842 (app.); 1842 (sp.); 1843; 1848 (r.); 1854	Incumbent retired. Democratic gain.	First ballot (December 12, 1859): ▌ ✓ John C. Breckinridge (Democratic) 81; ▌Joshua F. Bell (Opposition) 52
Louisiana	John Slidell	Democratic	1853 (sp.); 1854–55	No election. Democratic loss.	None.
Maryland	James Pearce	Democratic	1843; 1849; 1855	Incumbent re-elected.	First ballot (March 3, 1860): ▌ ✓ James Pearce (Democratic) 50; ▌James U. Dennis (Know Nothing) 34; Blank 1
Missouri	James S. Green	Democratic	1857 (sp.)	Incumbent withdrew during election. Democratic hold.	Fifteenth ballot (March 18, 1861): ▌ ✓ Waldo P. Johnson (Breckinridge Democratic) 81; ▌Alexander W. Doniphan (Constitutional Union) 36; ▌Thomas B. English (Douglas Democratic) 29
New Hampshire	Daniel Clark	Republican	1857	Incumbent re-elected.	First ballot (June 13, 1860): ▌ ✓ Daniel Clark (Republican) 184 H; 8 S; ▌John S. Wells (Democratic) 108 H; 2 S; Scattering 2 H; 0 S
New York	William H. Seward	Republican	1849; 1855	Incumbent retired. Republican hold.	First ballot (February 5, 1861): ▌ ✓ Ira Harris (Republican) 88 A; 22 S; ▌Horatio Seymour (Democratic) 31 A; 9 S
North Carolina	Thomas L. Clingman	Democratic	1858 (app.); 1858 (sp.)	Incumbent re-elected.	First ballot (January 31, 1861): ▌ ✓ Thomas L. Clingman (Democratic) 85; ▌William A. Graham (Whig) 17; ▌Bedford Brown (Democratic) 16; ▌Sion H. Rogers (Whig) 11; ▌Burgess S. Gaither (Whig) 6; ▌William N. H. Smith (Whig) 4; ▌Richard S. Donnell (Whig) 2; Scattering 6
Ohio	George E. Pugh	Democratic	1854	Incumbent lost re-election. Republican gain.	First ballot (February 3, 1860): ▌ ✓ Salmon P. Chase (Republican) 76; ▌George E. Pugh (Democratic) 53; ▌Thomas Corwin (Republican) 5
Oregon	Joseph Lane	Democratic	1859	Incumbent retired. Democratic hold.	Fourteenth ballot (October 2, 1860): ▌ ✓ James Nesmith (Douglas Democratic) 27; ▌Matthew Deady (Breckinridge Democratic) 22; Blank 1
Pennsylvania	William Bigler	Democratic	1856	Incumbent retired. People's gain.	First ballot (January 8, 1861): ▌ ✓ Edgar Cowan (People's) 98; ▌Henry D. Foster (Democratic) 35
South Carolina	James H. Hammond	Democratic	1857	No election. Democratic loss.	None.
Vermont	Jacob Collamer	Republican	1855	Incumbent re-elected.	First ballot (October 16, 1860): ▌ ✓ Jacob Collamer (Republican) 198 H; 27 S; ▌Paul Dillingham (Democratic) 24 H; 1 S
Wisconsin	Charles Durkee	Republican	1855	Incumbent retired. Republican hold.	First ballot (January 23, 1861): ▌ ✓ Timothy O. Howe (Republican) 82; ▌Henry L. Palmer (Democratic) 34

=== Special elections during the next Congress ===
State	Incumbent			This race	
State	Senator	Party	Electoral history	Results	Candidates
Pennsylvania (Class 1)	Simon Cameron	People's	1857	Incumbent resigned March 4, 1861. New member elected March 14, 1861. People's hold.	First ballot (March 14, 1861): ▌ ✓ David Wilmot (People's) 95; ▌William H. Welsh (Democratic) 35; Scattering 2
Ohio (Class 3)	Salmon P. Chase	Republican	1849; 1855 (ret.); 1860	Incumbent resigned March 6, 1861. New member elected March 21, 1861. Republican hold.	First ballot (March 21, 1861): ▌ ✓ John Sherman (Republican) 76; ▌William Kennon (Democratic) 53
Virginia (Class 1)	James M. Mason	Democratic	1847 (sp.); 1850; 1856	Incumbent expelled July 11, 1861. New member elected July 9, 1861. Union gain.	First ballot (July 9, 1861): ▌ ✓ Waitman T. Willey (Union) 22; ▌Peter G. Van Winkle (Union) 10; ▌Daniel Lamb (Union) 6
Virginia (Class 2)	Robert M. T. Hunter	Democratic	1846; 1852; 1858	Incumbent expelled July 11, 1861. New member elected July 9, 1861. Union gain.	First ballot (July 9, 1861): ▌ ✓ John S. Carlile (Union) 38
Kentucky (Class 3)	John C. Breckinridge	Democratic	1859	Incumbent expelled December 4, 1861. New member elected December 10, 1861. Union gain.	First ballot (December 10, 1861): ▌ ✓ Garrett Davis (Union) 84; ▌William Johnson (Southern Rights) 12; ▌William O. Butler (Union) 1

== Alabama ==
Alabama election
- No election
Senator before election
Benjamin Fitzpatrick
Democratic
Elected Senator
None (vacant from January 21, 1861)

One-term Democrat Benjamin Fitzpatrick was elected in 1855. He withdrew from the Senate on January 21, 1861, following the secession of Alabama. The Alabama Legislature did not hold an election for the next term, and the seat remained vacant until 1868.

== Arkansas ==
Arkansas election
- December 20, 1860

Members of the Arkansas General Assembly Majority of voting members needed to win
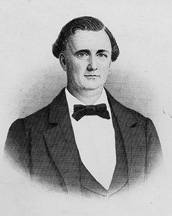

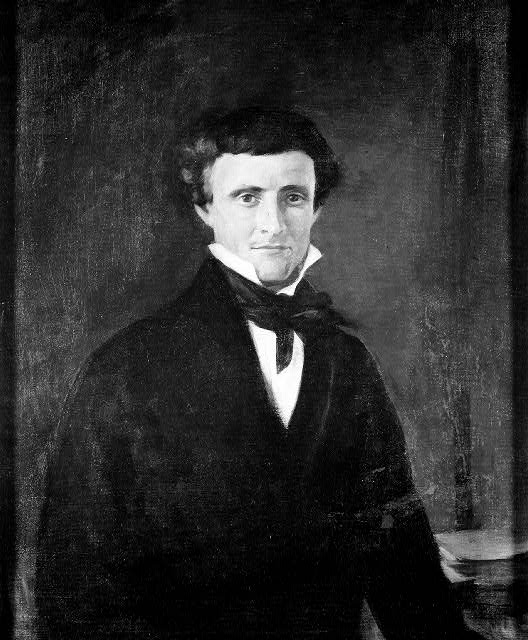
Nominee	Charles B. Mitchel	Samuel H. Hempstead	George C. Watkins
Party	Democratic	Democratic	Democratic
1st ballot	27 (29.7%)	33 (33.0%)	23 (25.3%)
9th ballot	52 (55.9%)	26 (28.0%)	8 (8.6%)
Senator before election
Robert W. Johnson
Democratic
Elected Senator
Charles B. Mitchel
Democratic

One-term Democrat Robert W. Johnson was elected in 1855. He was not a candidate for re-election.

The Arkansas General Assembly met on December 20, 1860, to hold an election for the next term. Democrats Charles B. Mitchel, Samuel H. Hempstead, N. B. Burrow, and George C. Watkins were nominated as candidates. Burrow, a secessionist, declined to be considered; the remaining candidates were notably cautious in their responses to Lincoln's election.

Mitchel was elected with 52 votes on the ninth ballot. He subsequently was expelled from Congress on July 11, 1861, following the secession of Arkansas.

== California ==
There were two elections in California, due to the death of David C. Broderick.

=== California (special) ===
California special election
- January 9, 1860

Members of the California State Legislature Majority of voting members needed to win
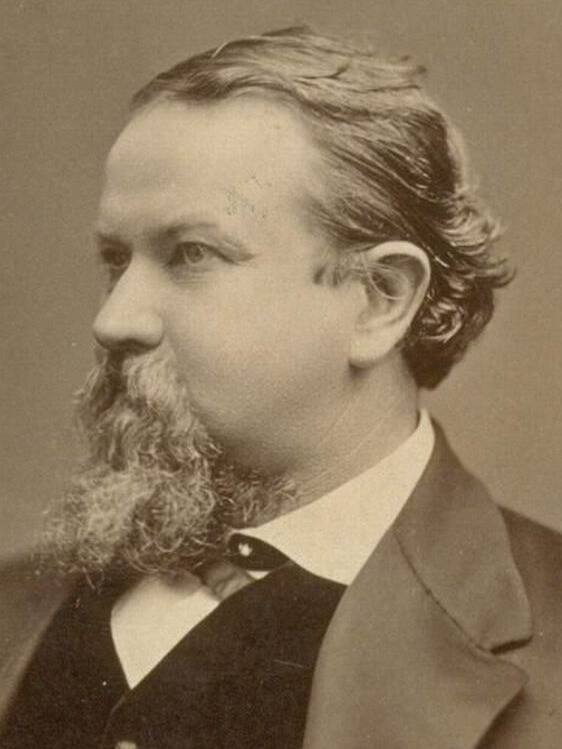

Nominee	Milton Latham	Edmund Randolph
Party	Lecompton Democratic	Anti-Lecompton Democratic
1st ballot	97 (85.1%)	14 (12.3%)
Senator before election
Henry Haun (interim)
Democratic
Elected Senator
Milton Latham
Lecompton Democratic

Incumbent Democrat Henry P. Haun was appointed in 1859 to fill the vacancy created by Broderick's death.

The California State Legislature met in joint session on January 14, 1861, to hold a special election for the unexpired term. The Lecompton Democratic governor of California Milton Latham defeated the Anti-Lecompton Democrat Edward Randolph. The Republican candidate Oscar L. Shafter received only three votes out of the 114 cast.

=== California (regular) ===
California election
- March 9–20, 1861 (1st–22nd); April 2, 1861 (23rd)

Members of the California State Legislature Majority of voting members needed to win
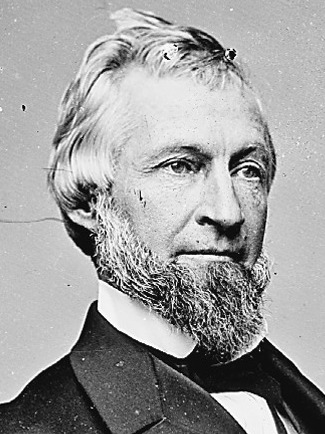

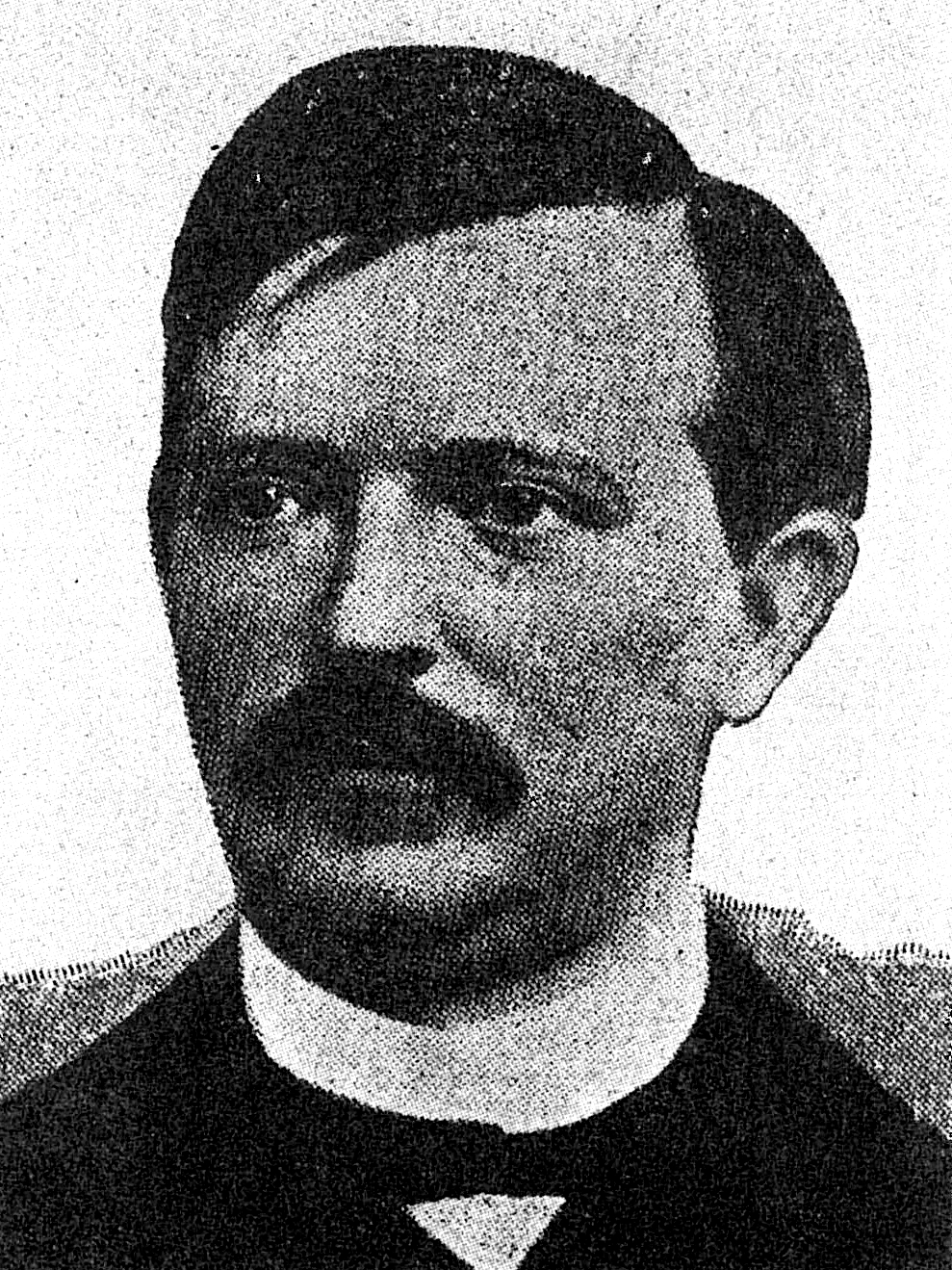

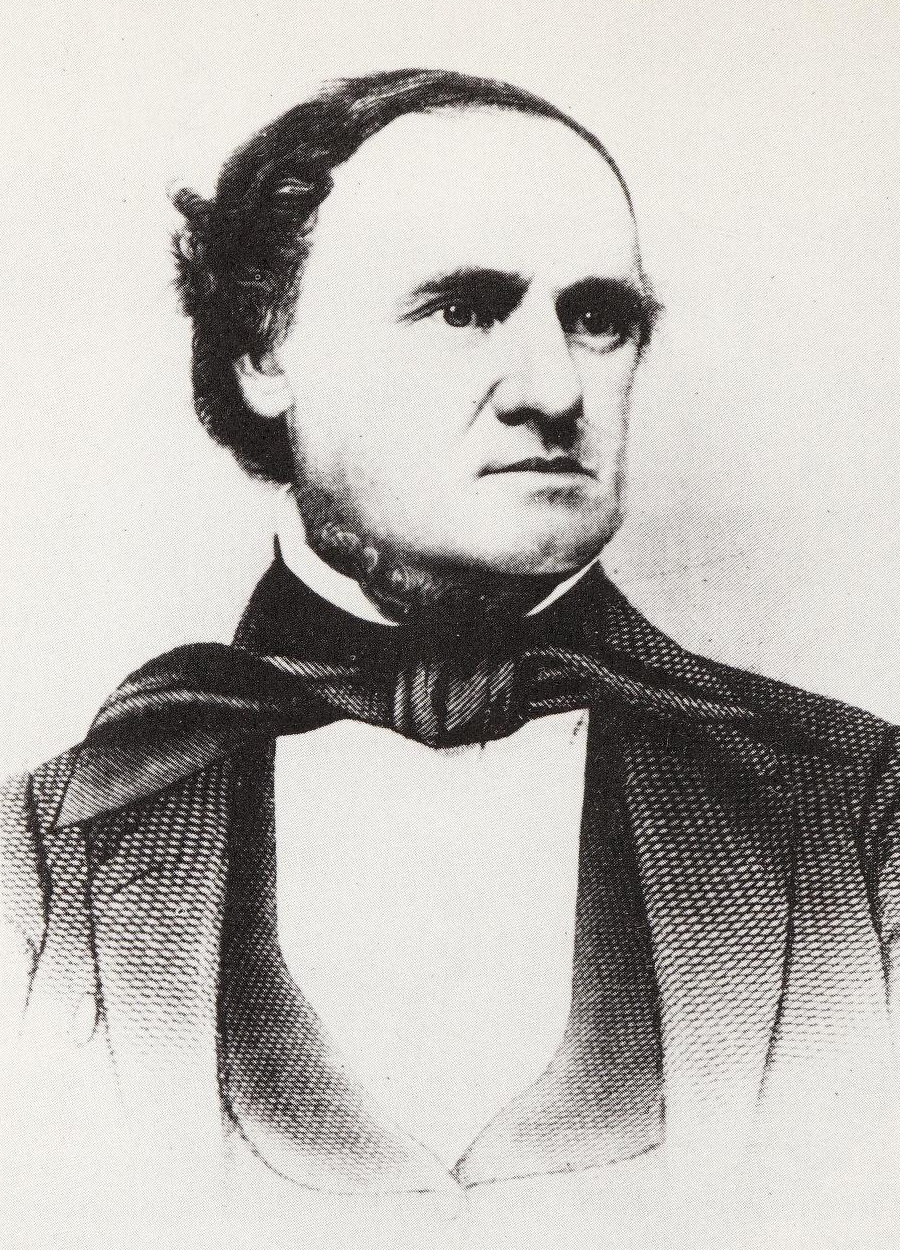

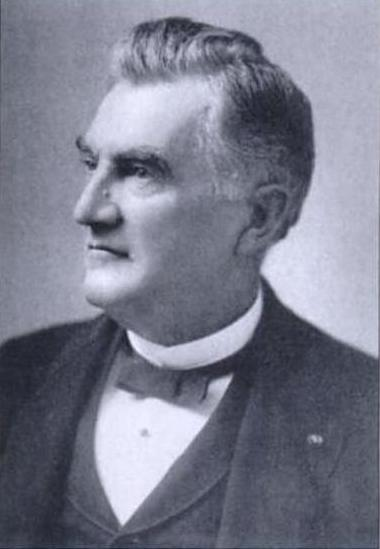

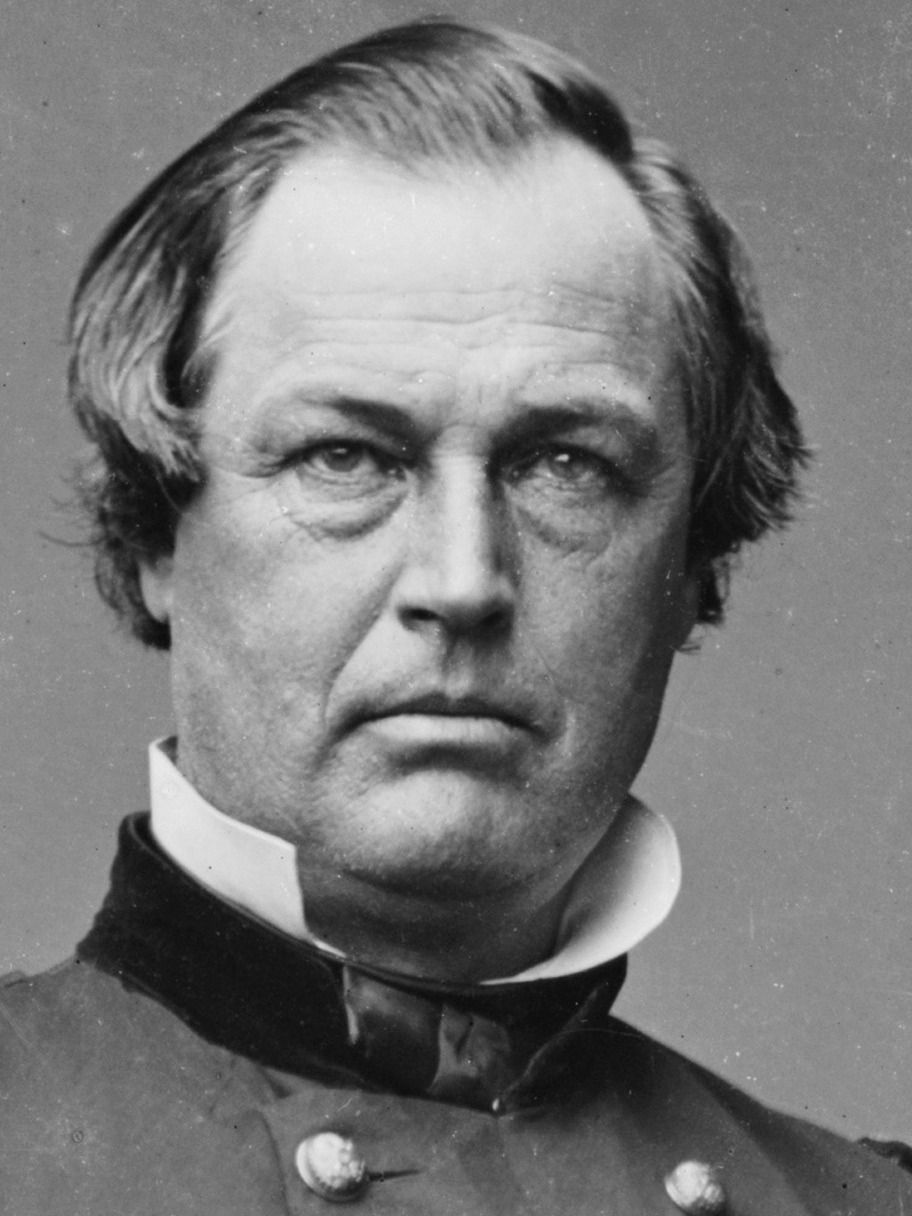
Nominee	James A. McDougall	John Nugent	John B. Weller
Party	Douglas Democratic (Anti-Lecompton)	Douglas Democratic (Lecompton)	Breckinridge Democratic
1st ballot	27 (23.9%)	9 (8.0%)	27 (23.9%)
23rd ballot	57 (54.8%)	39 (37.5%)	4 (3.8%)
Nominee	Timothy G. Phelps	James W. Denver
Party	Republican	Douglas Democratic (Lecompton)
1st ballot	23 (20.4%)	16 (14.3%)
23rd ballot	—	—
Senator before election
William M. Gwin
Democratic
Elected Senator
James A. McDougall
Democratic

Two-term Democrat William M. Gwin was re-elected in 1857 following the failure of the California State Legislature to elect a senator in 1855. He was not a candidate for re-election.

The California Democratic Party was divided between proslavery Chivalry or Lecompton Democrats, and free soil Anti-Lecompton Democrats. The 1860 U.S. presidential election multiplied these divisions, producing splits between supporters of the presidential candidacies of Stephen A. Douglas and John C. Breckinridge, and between Lecompton and Anti-Lecompton Douglas Democrats. The Constitutional Union Party, composed of conservative former Whigs, was of minimal importance. California Republicans were able to capitalize on the bitterness between the Democratic factions to carry the state in the national election with less than one third of the votes cast.

Gwin's term ended on March 3, 1861, without the legislature having chosen his successor. On March 9, the Senate and the House of Representatives met in joint session to hold an election for the next term. Anti-Lecompton Douglas Democrat James A. McDougall, Breckinridge Democrat John B. Weller, Republican Timothy G. Phelps, and Lecompton Douglas Democrats James W. Denver and John Nugent were the major candidates.

Several coalitions of various factions were attempted during the balloting. Lacking the votes to elect their own candidate, the Republicans threw their support to McDougall in order to forestall a coalition of the Breckinridge and Lecompton Douglas Democrats.

After multiple rounds of voting spread out over several days, McDougall was apparently elected on March 20 with 56 votes on the 22nd ballot. Subsequently, it was discovered that McDougall's total fell one vote short of the requisite majority for a legal election. The joint session reconvened on April 2, when McDougall received the necessary 57 votes on the first (23rd overall) ballot.

== Connecticut ==
Connecticut election
- May 10, 1860

Members of the Connecticut General Assembly Majority in both houses needed to win
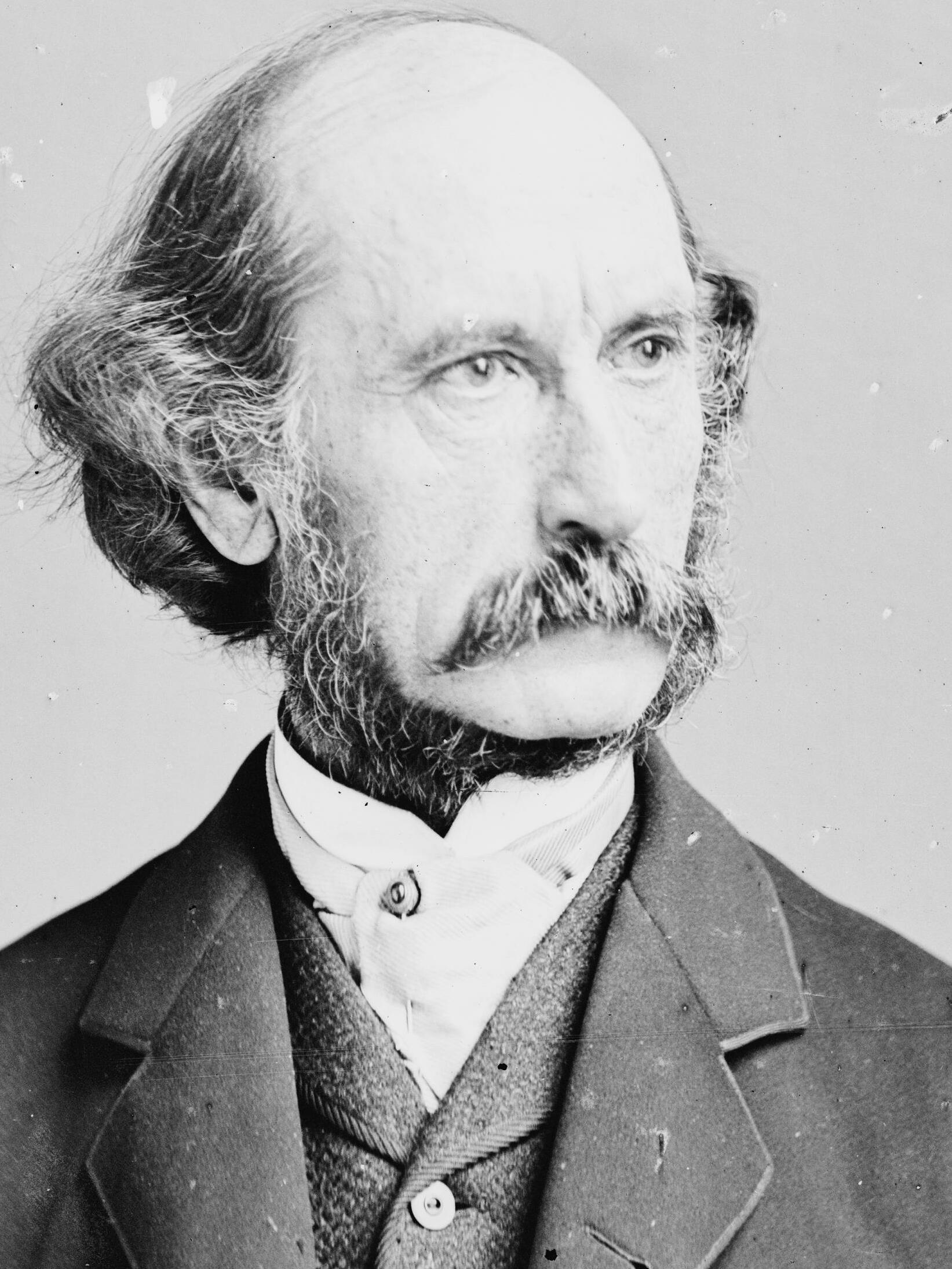

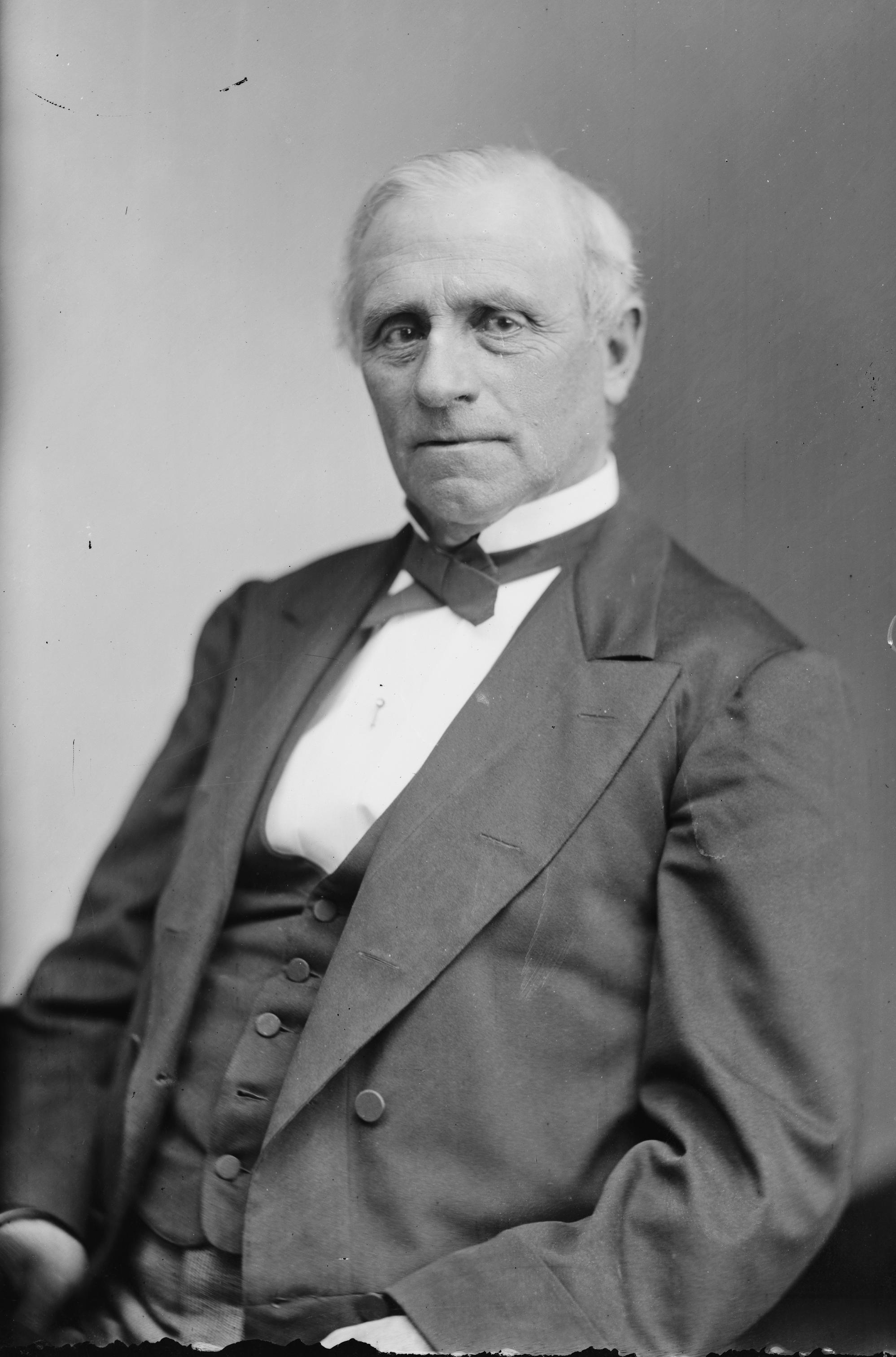
Nominee	Lafayette S. Foster	William W. Eaton
Party	Republican	Democratic
House	139 (66.5%)	70 (33.5%)
Senate	16 (69.6%)	7 (21.4%)
Senator before election
Lafayette S. Foster
Republican
Elected Senator
Lafayette S. Foster
Republican

One-term Republican Lafayette S. Foster was elected in 1854.

The Senate and the House of Representatives met separately on May 10, 1860, to hold an election for the next term. Foster defeated the Democratic candidate William W. Eaton on the first ballot.

== Florida ==
Florida election
- No election
Senator before election
David L. Yulee
Democratic
Elected Senator
None (vacant from January 21, 1861)

One-term Democrat David L. Yulee was elected in 1855. He withdrew from the Senate on January 21, 1861, following the secession of Florida. The Florida Legislature did not hold an election for the next term, and the seat remained vacant until 1868.

== Georgia ==
Georgia election
- No election
Senator before election
Alfred Iverson
Democratic
Elected Senator
None (vacant from January 28, 1861)

One-term Democrat Alfred Iverson was elected in 1854 or 1855. He withdrew from the Senate on January 28, 1861, following the secession of Georgia. The Georgia Legislature did not hold an election for the next term, and the seat remained vacant until 1871.

== Illinois ==
Illinois election
- January 10, 1861

Members of the Illinois General Assembly Majority of voting members needed to win
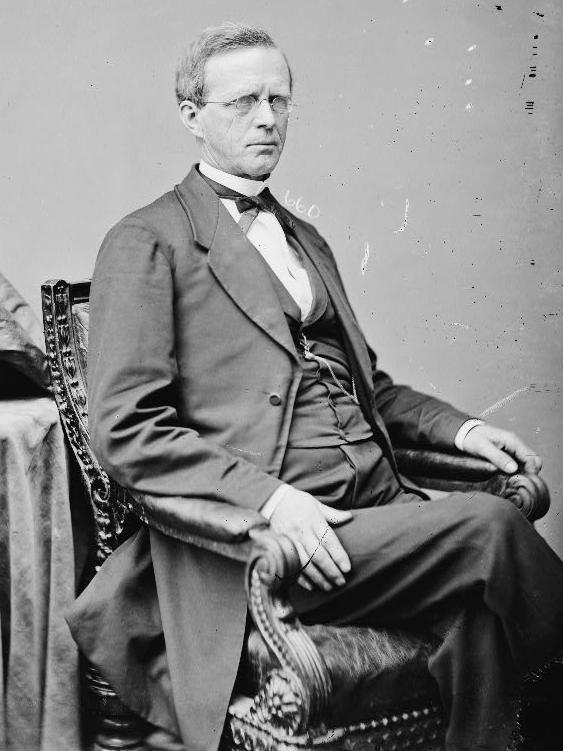

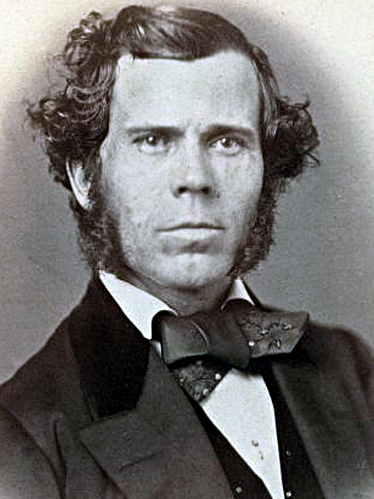
Nominee	Lyman Trumbull	Samuel S. Marshall
Party	Republican	Democratic
1st ballot	54 (54.0%)	46 (46.0%)
Senator before election
Lyman Trumbull
Republican
Elected Senator
Lyman Trumbull
Republican

One-term Republican Lyman Trumbull was elected in 1855.

The Illinois General Assembly met in joint session on January 10, 1861, to hold an election for the next term. Trumbull defeated the Democratic candidate Samuel S. Marshall on the first ballot.

== Indiana ==
Indiana election
- January 16, 1861

Members of the Indiana General Assembly Majority of voting members needed to win
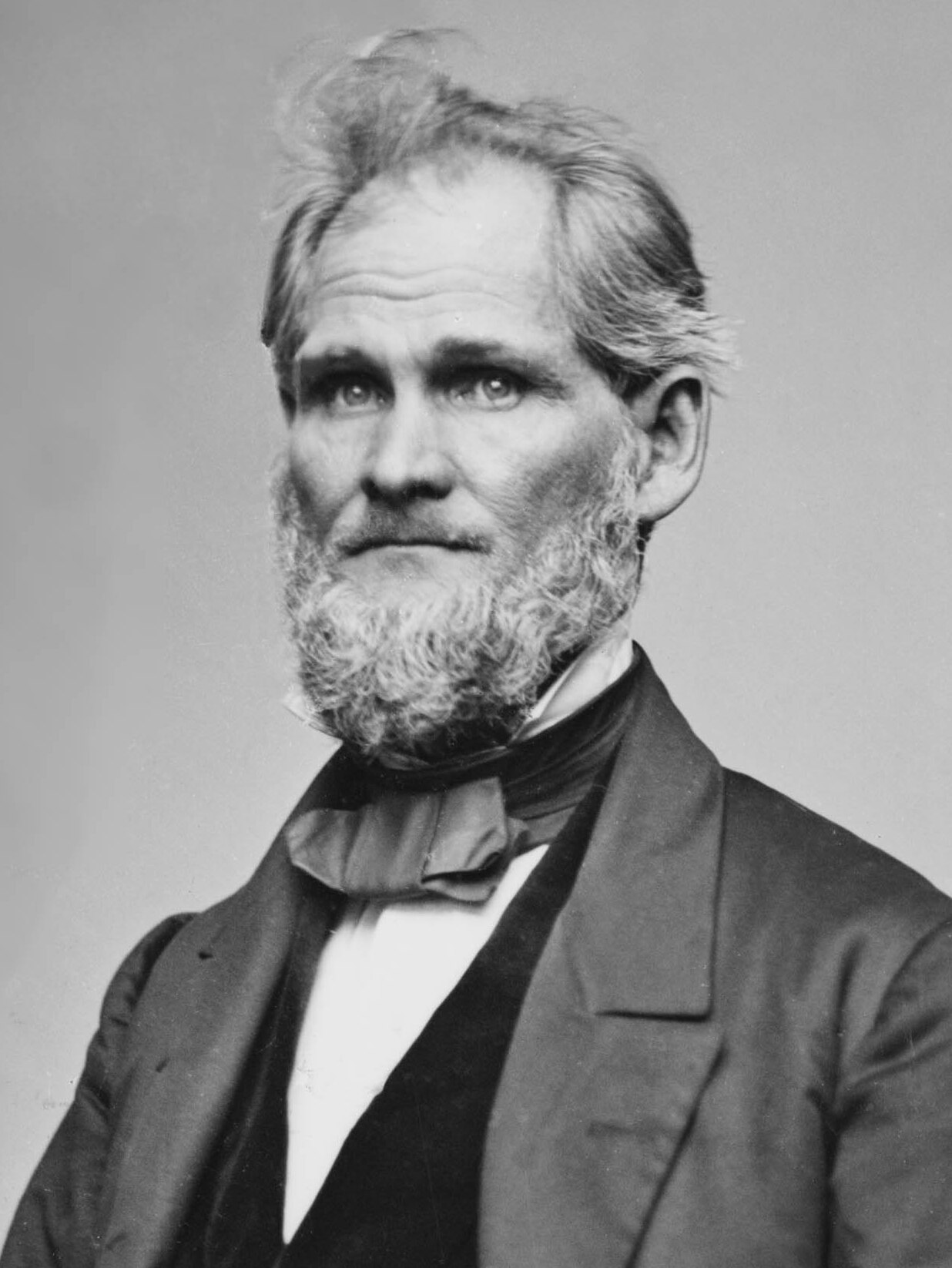

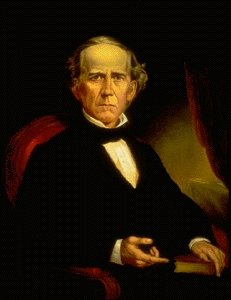
Nominee	Henry S. Lane	Joseph A. Wright
Party	Republican	Democratic
1st ballot	88 (60.7%)	57 (39.3%)
Senator before election
Graham N. Fitch
Democratic
Elected Senator
Henry S. Lane
Republican

Incumbent Democrat Graham N. Fitch was elected in 1857 following the failure of the legislature to elect a senator in 1855. He was not a candidate for re-election.

The Indiana General Assembly met in joint session on January 16, 1861, to hold an election for the next term. The Republican governor of Indiana Henry S. Lane defeated the Democratic former governor Joseph A. Wright on the first ballot. Wright was subsequently appointed to the other Indiana seat following the expulsion of Democrat Jesse D. Bright later in 1861. Lane's election elevated the lieutenant governor Oliver P. Morton to the governorship in accordance with an arrangement between the two men worked out in advance of the 1860 state elections.

== Iowa ==
Iowa election
- January 14, 1860

Members of the Iowa General Assembly Majority of voting members needed to win
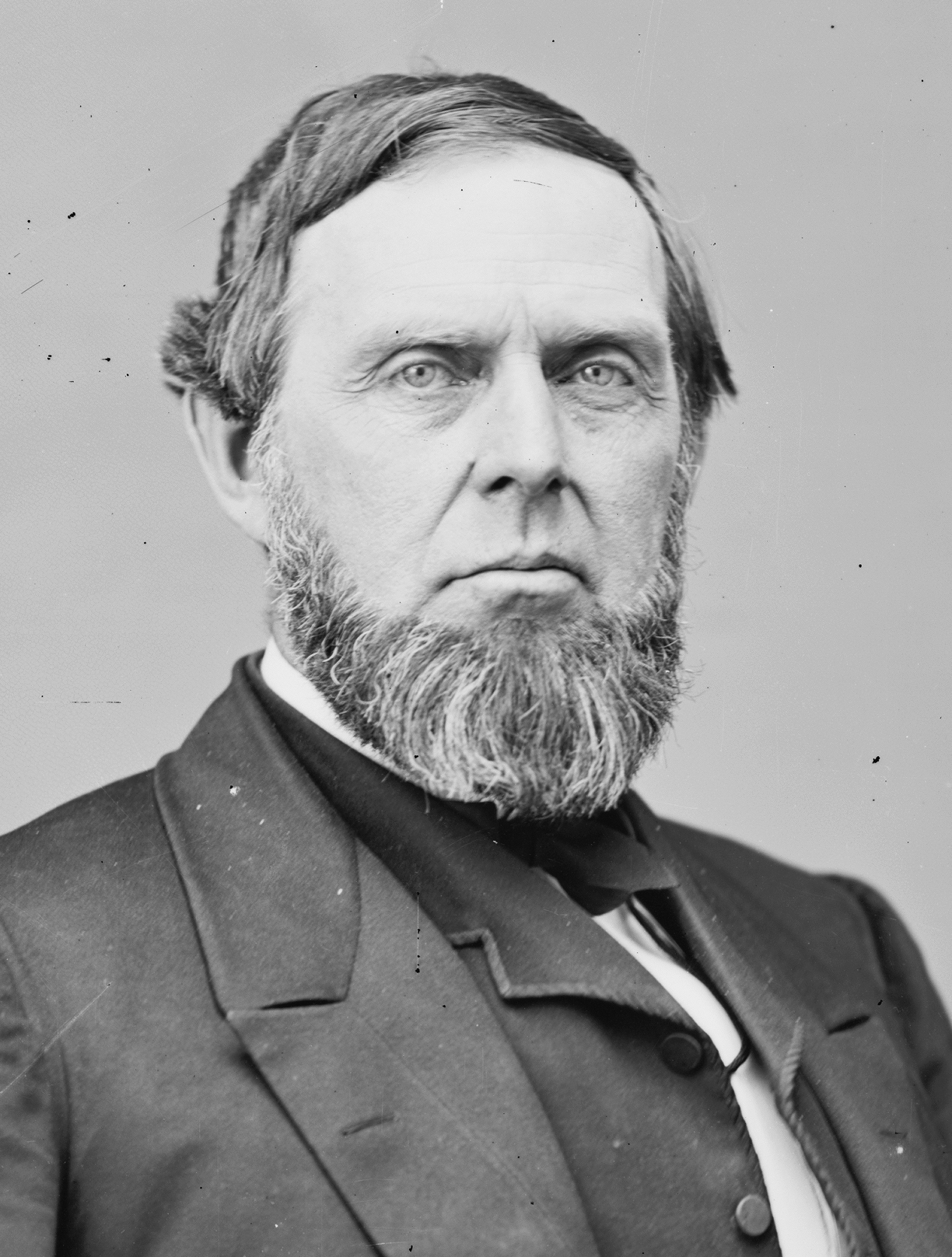

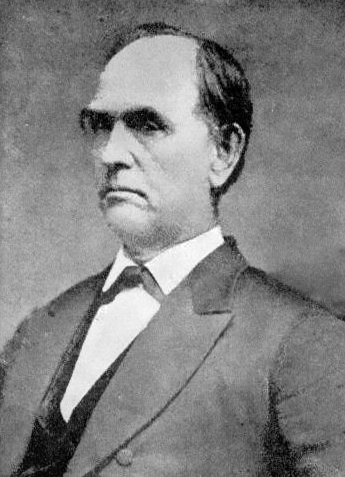
Nominee	James Harlan	Augustus C. Dodge
Party	Republican	Democratic
1st ballot	73 (58.4%)	52 (41.6%)
Senator before election
James Harlan
Republican
Elected Senator
James Harlan
Republican

One-term Republican James Harlan was re-elected in 1857 following the invalidation of his initial election in 1855.

The Iowa General Assembly met in joint session on January 14, 1860, to hold an election for the next term. Harlan defeated the Democratic candidate Augustus C. Dodge on the first ballot.

== Kansas ==
Kansas election
- April 4, 1861

100 members of the Kansas Legislature 51 votes needed to win
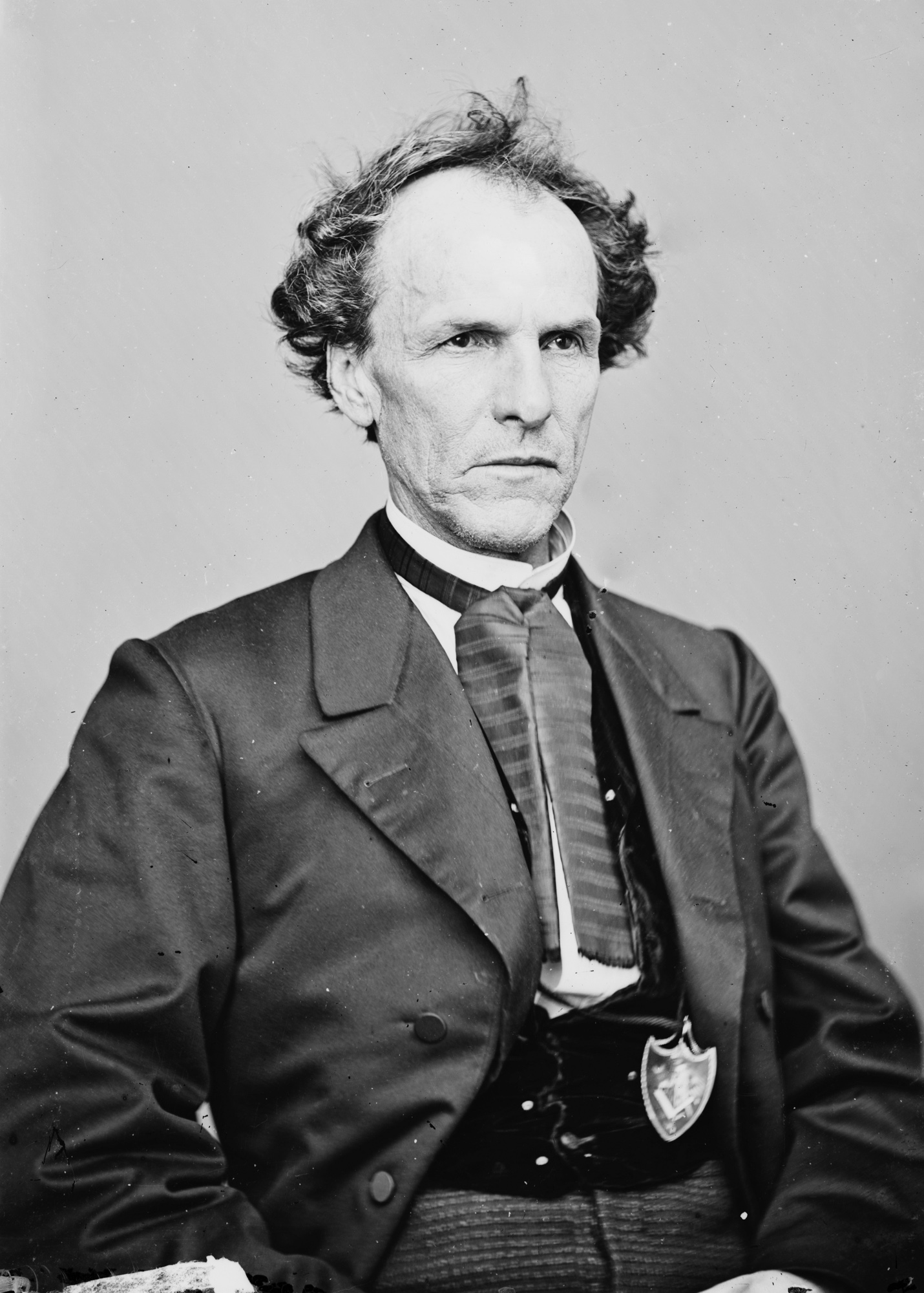

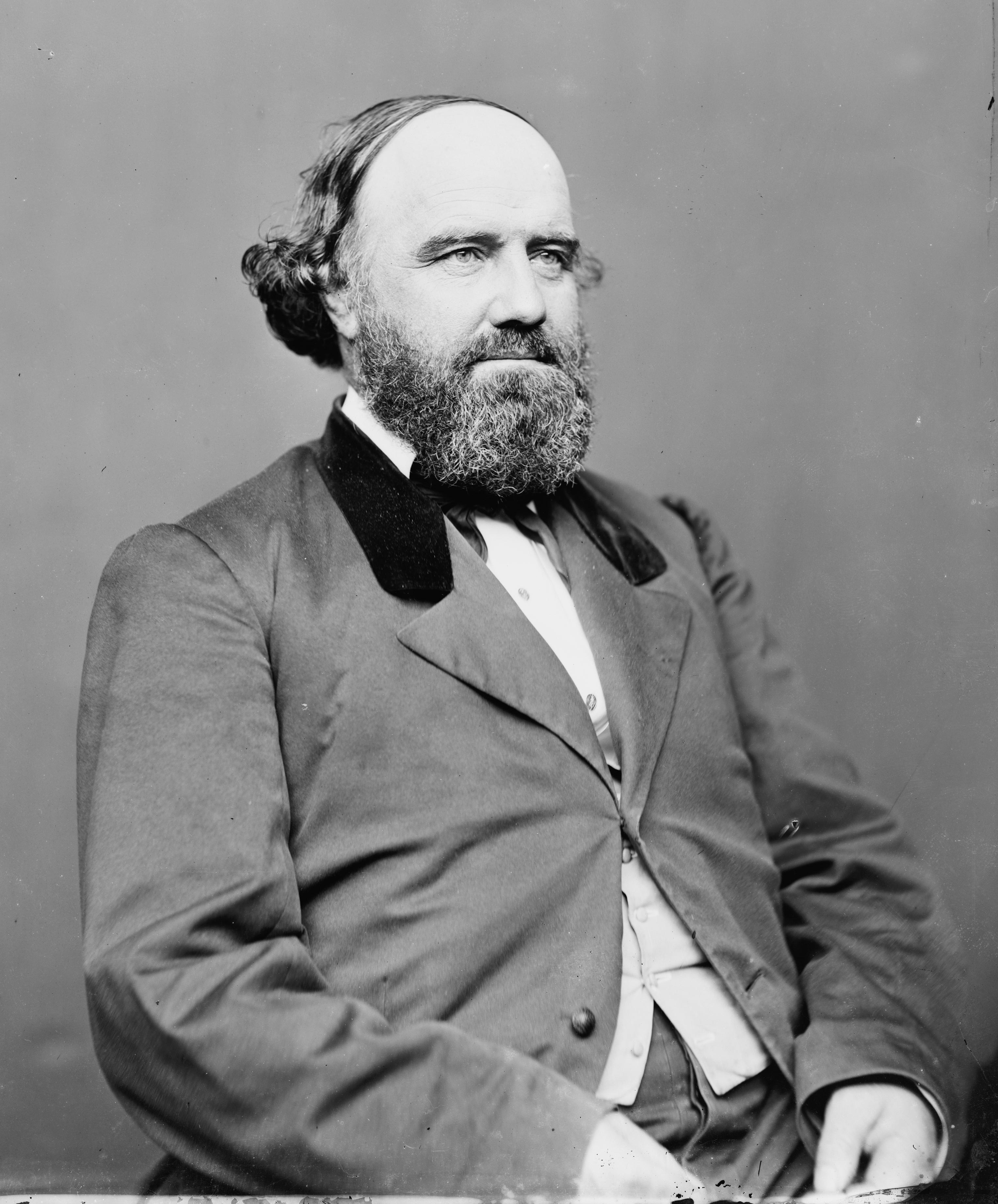

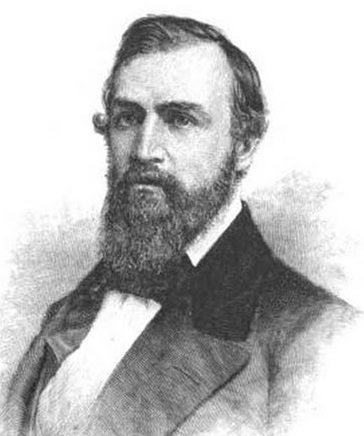

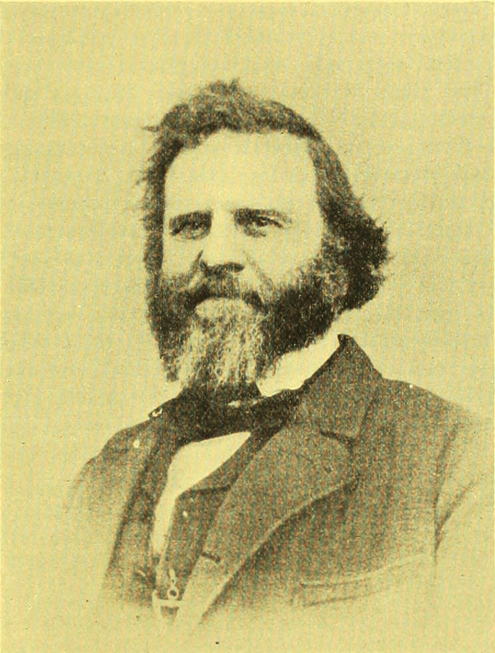

Nominee	James H. Lane	Samuel C. Pomeroy	Marcus J. Parrott
Party	Republican	Republican	Republican
1st ballot	55 (55.0%)	52 (52.0%)	49 (49.0%)
Nominee	Frederick P. Stanton	A. J. Isacks
Party	Republican	Democratic
1st ballot	21 (21.0%)	11 (11.0%)
Senators before election
None
Elected Senators
James H. Lane (Class 2)
Samuel C. Pomeroy (Class 3)
Republican

Kansas elected two senators following its admission on January 29, 1861.

The Kansas Legislature met in joint session on April 4, 1861, to hold elections for both seats. Members voted for two candidates, with the first and second-place finishers being elected.

James H. Lane, Marcus J. Parrott, Samuel C. Pomeroy, and Frederick P. Stanton were the leading Republican candidates in a field that also included Mark W. Delahay and Thomas Ewing. Ewing withdrew prior to the election, while Delahay exerted little effort on his own behalf. The Kansas Democratic Party was hopelessly outnumbered in the legislature, and those Democrats like Archibald Williams and P. T. Abell who allowed their names to be mentioned did not seriously hope to be elected.

Voting took place over two hours, with members switching their votes frequently as the fortunes of the candidates rose and fell. Lane and Pomeroy had 55 and 52 votes, respectively, on the final tally and were pronounced elected.

== Kentucky ==
Two elections were held in Kentucky, due to the election and subsequent expulsion of John C. Breckinridge.

=== Kentucky (regular) ===
Kentucky election
- December 12, 1859

Members of the Kentucky General Assembly Majority of voting members needed to win
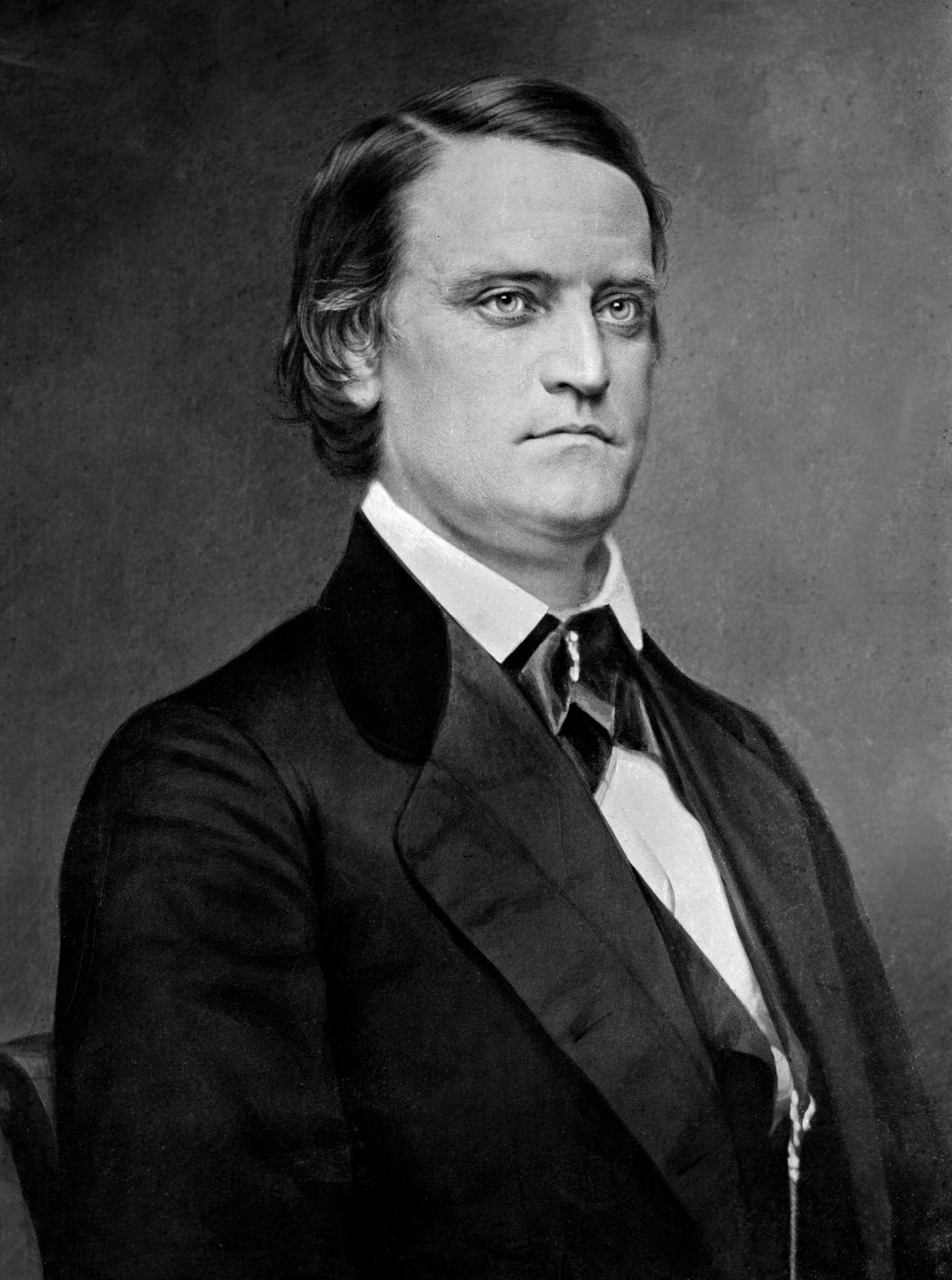

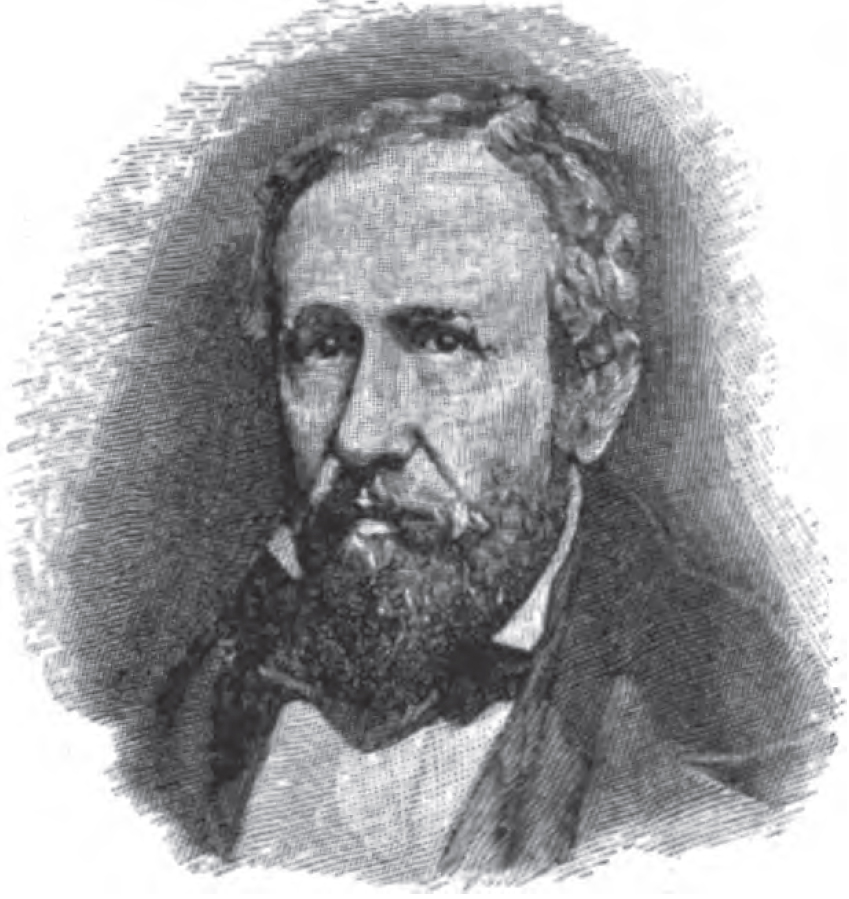
Nominee	John C. Breckinridge	Joshua F. Bell
Party	Democratic	Opposition
1st ballot	81 (60.9%)	52 (39.1%)
Senator before election
John J. Crittenden
Know Nothing
Elected Senator
John C. Breckinridge
Democratic

Three-term Know Nothing John J. Crittenden was re-elected in 1854. Crittenden had served previous non-consecutive terms from 1817 to 1819, from 1835 to 1841, and from 1842 to 1848. He was not a candidate for re-election.

Linn Boyd, John C. Breckinridge, Elijah Hise, and John C. Mason were candidates for the Democratic nomination. A caucus of Democratic legislators selected Breckinridge on December 11, 1859, in advance of the election.

The Kentucky General Assembly met in joint session on December 12, 1859, to hold an election for the next term, more than a year before the expiration of Crittenden's term. Breckinridge defeated the Opposition candidate Joshua F. Bell on the first ballot.

=== Kentucky (special) ===
Kentucky special election
- December 10, 1861

Members of the Kentucky General Assembly Majority of voting members needed to win
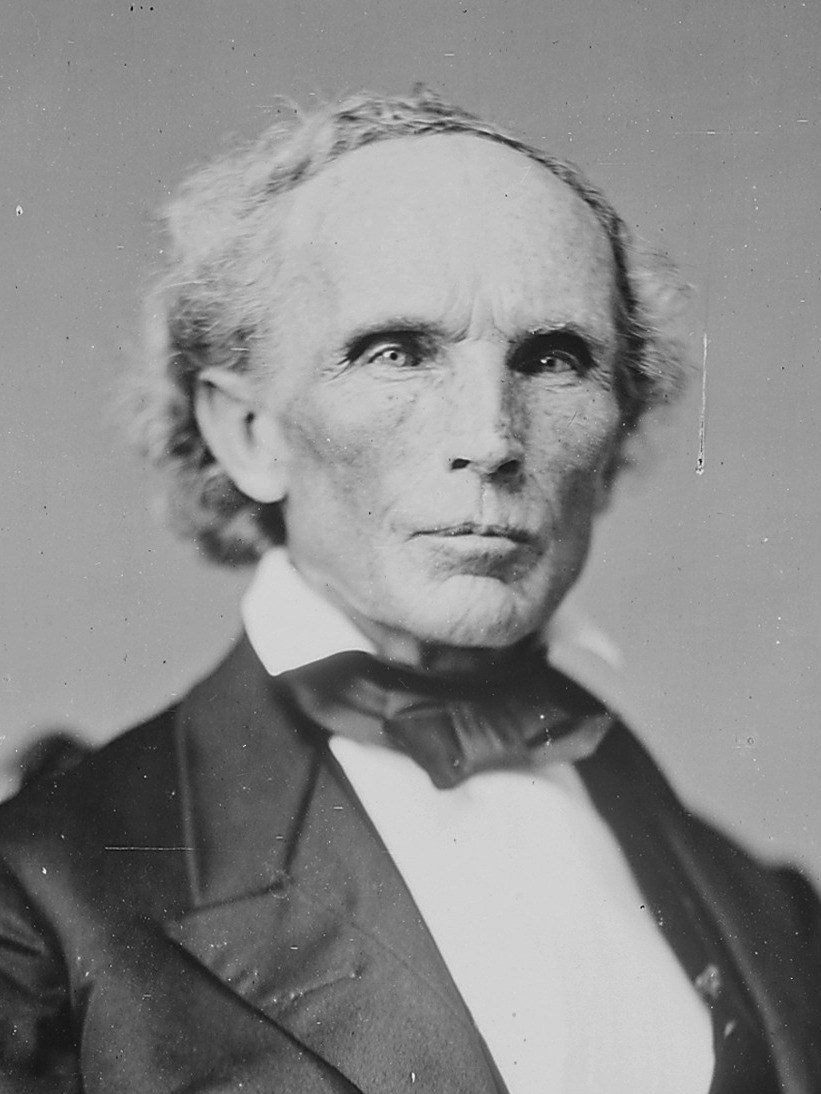

Nominee	Garrett Davis	William Johnson
Party	Union	Southern Rights
1st ballot	84 (86.6%)	12 (12.4%)
Senator before election
None (vacant from March 4, 1861)
Elected Senator
Garrett Davis
Union

Breckinridge did not return to Washington when the Senate resumed session on December 2, 1861, having enlisted in the Confederate States Army. He was expelled from Congress on December 4 for supporting the Confederacy.

The Unionist members of the legislature held a caucus on December 10, 1861, in advance of the special election. Garrett Davis, James Guthrie, Joshua F. Bell, John J. Crittenden, Joseph R. Underwood, and Joseph Holt were candidates on the first ballot. Allies of Crittenden, now a U.S. representative, asked that his name be withdrawn from further consideration, for fear that a special election for his congressional seat could be won by a secessionist. The contest then narrowed to Bell, Davis, and Guthrie. After several rounds of voting yielded no result, Bell withdrew his candidacy; Davis defeated Guthrie on the 10th ballot with 65 votes to Guthrie's 64.

The Kentucky General Assembly met on December 10, 1861, to hold a special election for the unexpired term. Voting proceeded separately in the Senate and the House of Representatives, after which the votes were tallied jointly. Davis defeated the Southern Rights candidate William Johnson on the first ballot.

== Louisiana ==
Louisiana election
- No election
Senator before election
John Slidell
Democratic
Elected Senator
None (vacant from February 4, 1861)

One-term Democrat John Slidell was elected in 1854 or 1855. He withdrew from the Senate on February 4, 1861, following the secession of Louisiana. The Louisiana State Legislature did not hold an election for the next term, and the seat remained vacant until 1868.

== Maine (special) ==
Maine special election
- January 9, 1861

Members of the Maine Legislature Majority in both houses needed to win
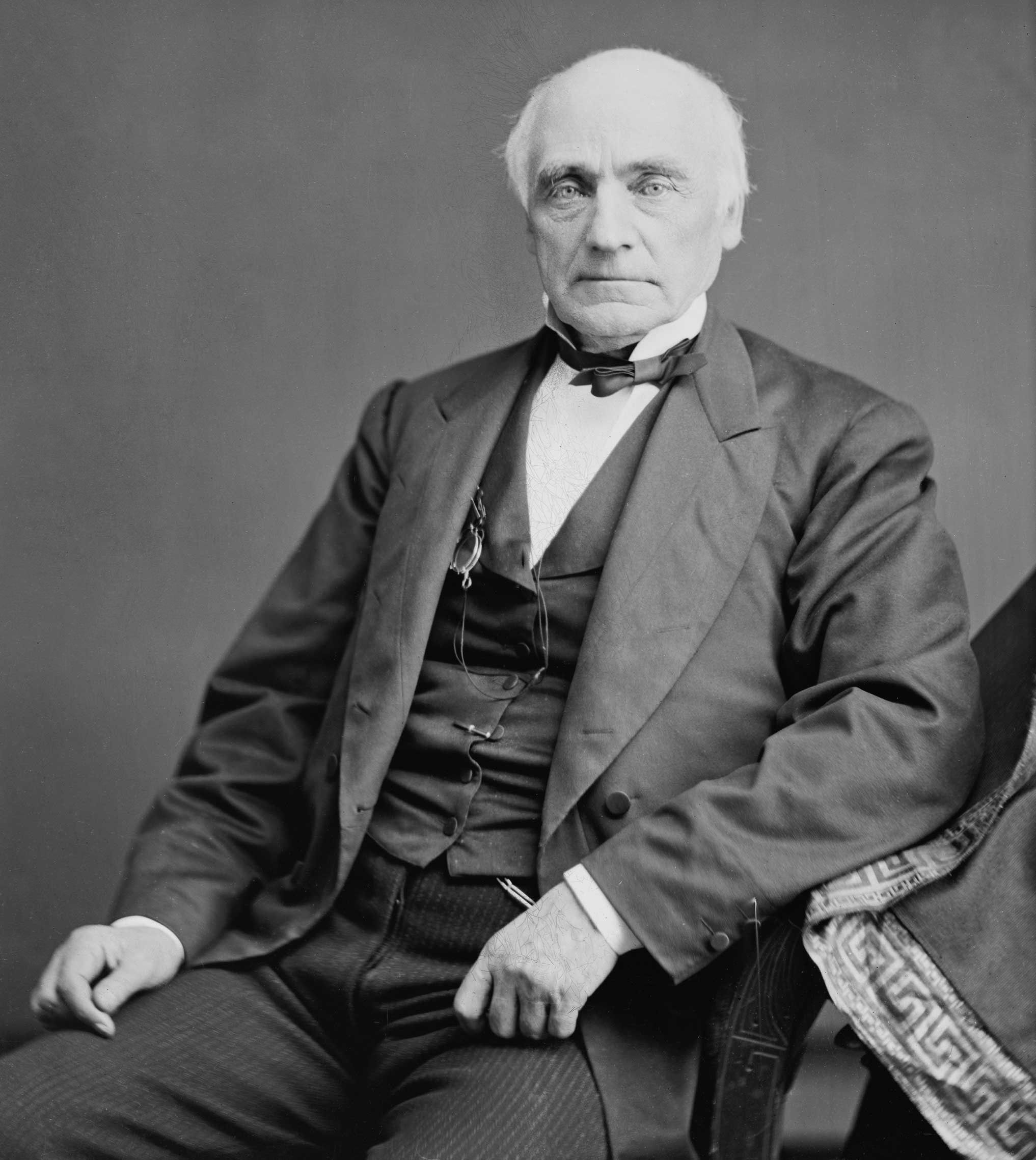

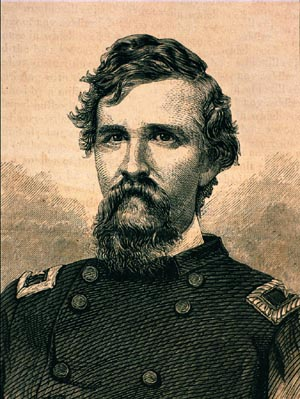
Nominee	Lot M. Morrill	George F. Shepley
Party	Republican	Democratic
House	124 (84.4%)	23 (15.6%)
Senate	29 (100.0%)	—
Senator before election
Hannibal Hamlin
Republican
Elected Senator
Lot M. Morrill
Republican

Two-term Republican Hannibal Hamlin was re-elected in 1857. Hamlin was elected vice president in 1860 and resigned his Senate seat on January 7, 1861.

The Senate and the House of Representatives met separately on January 9, 1861, to hold a special election for the unexpired term. The Republican candidate Lot M. Morrill defeated the Democratic candidate George F. Shepley on the first ballot.

== Maryland ==
Maryland election
- March 2, 1860

Members of the Maryland General Assembly Majority of voting members needed to win
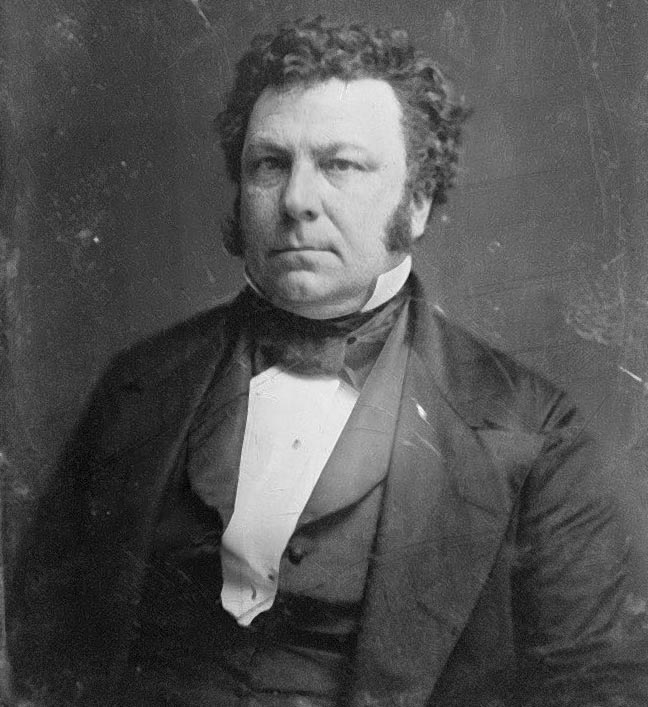

Nominee	James A. Pearce	James U. Dennis
Party	Democratic	Know Nothing
1st ballot	50 (59.5%)	34 (40.5%)
Senator before election
James A. Pearce
Democratic
Elected Senator
James A. Pearce
Democratic

Three-term Democrat James A. Pearce was re-elected in 1855.

The Maryland General Assembly met on March 2, 1860, to hold an election for the next term. Voting proceeded separately in the Senate and the House of Delegates, after which the tellers withdrew and to count the ballots in the Senate chamber. Pearce defeated the Know Nothing candidate James U. Dennis on the first ballot.

== Missouri ==
Missouri election
- March 13–18, 1861

Members of the Missouri General Assembly Majority of voting members needed to win
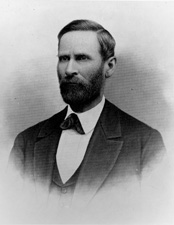

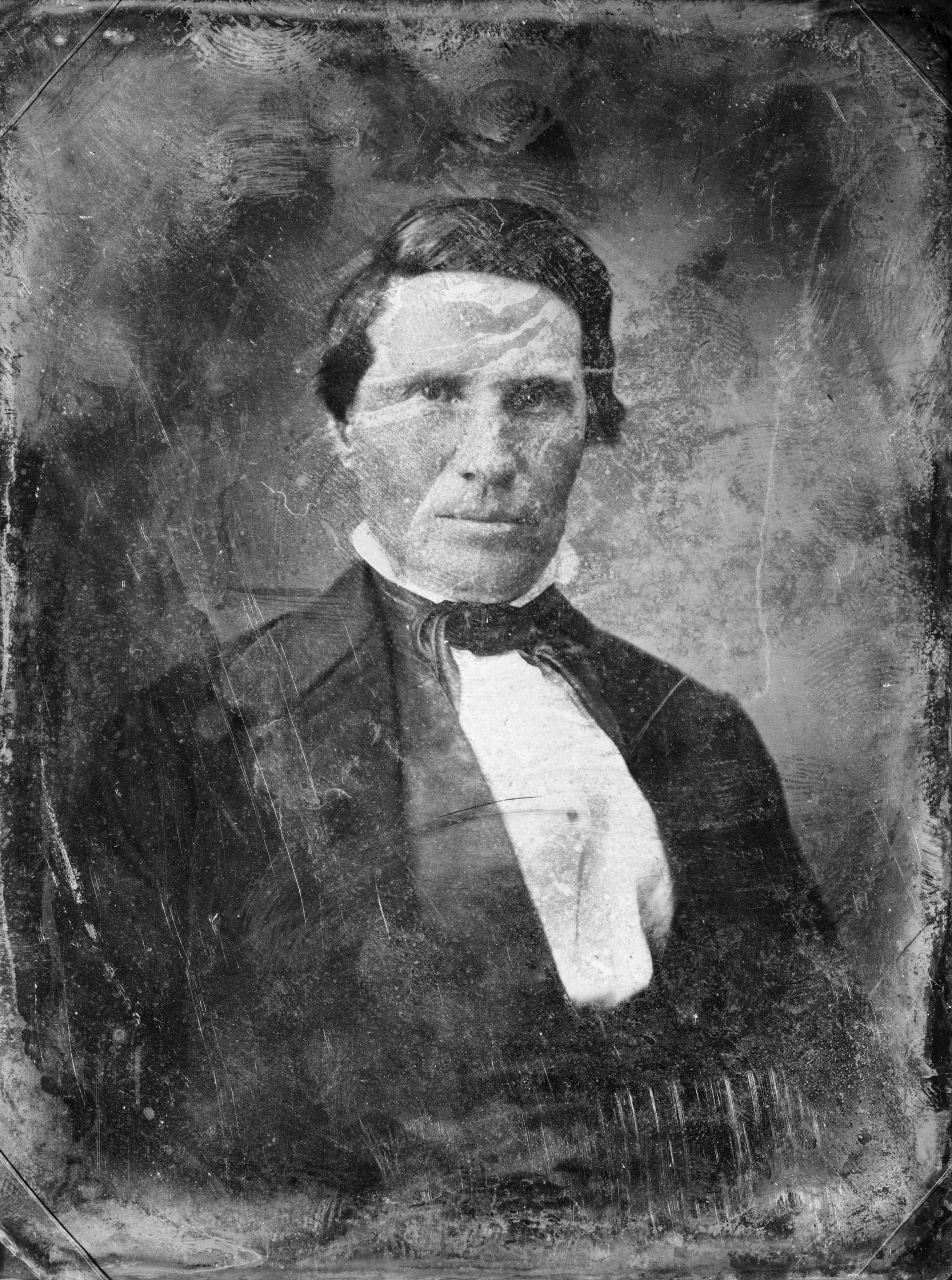

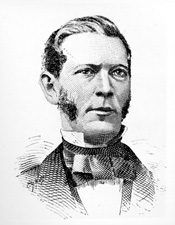

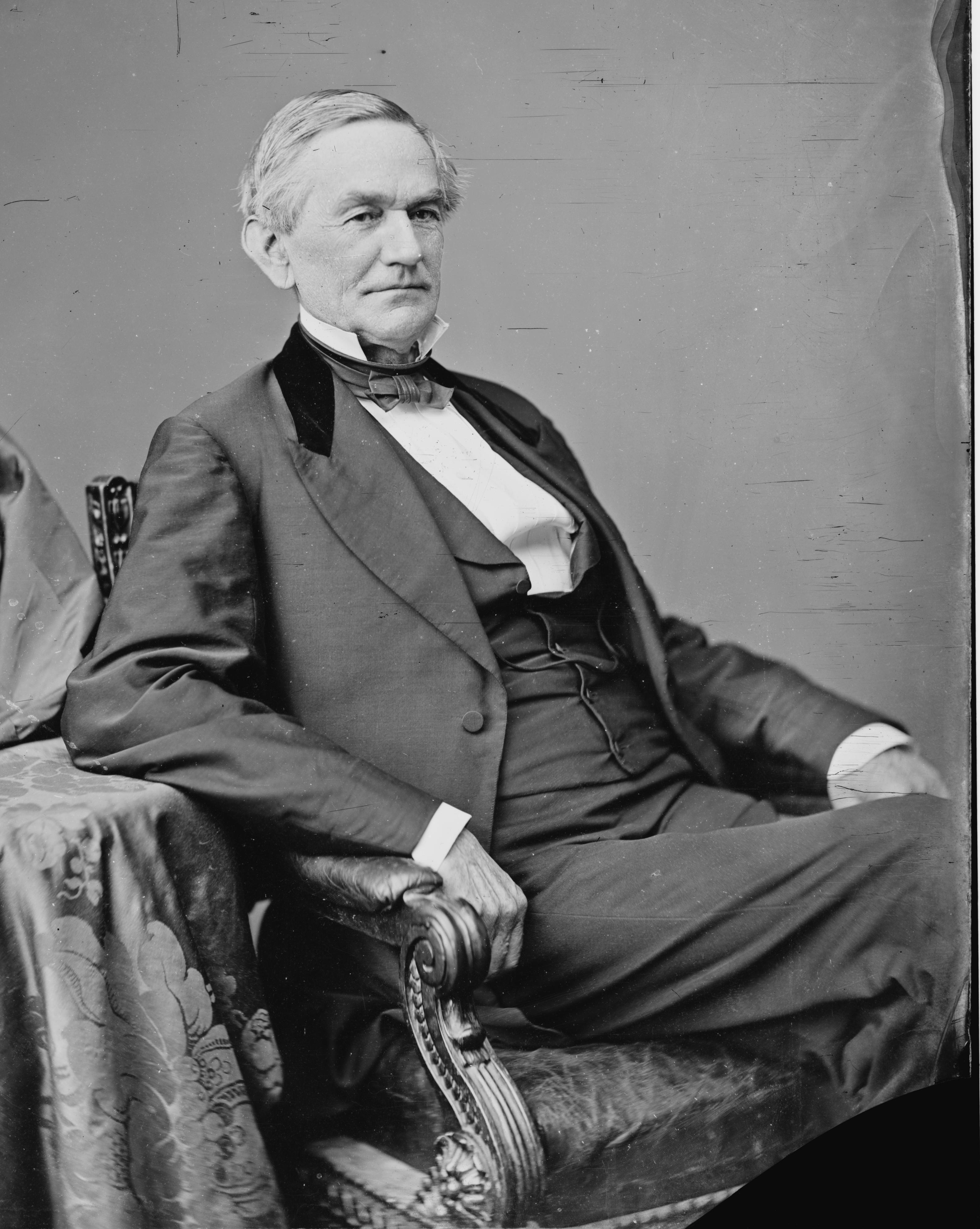

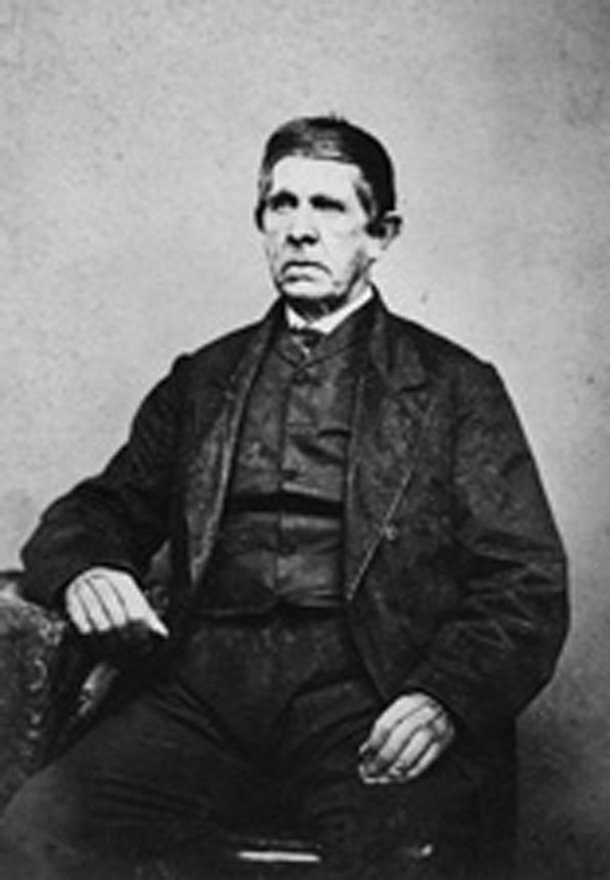

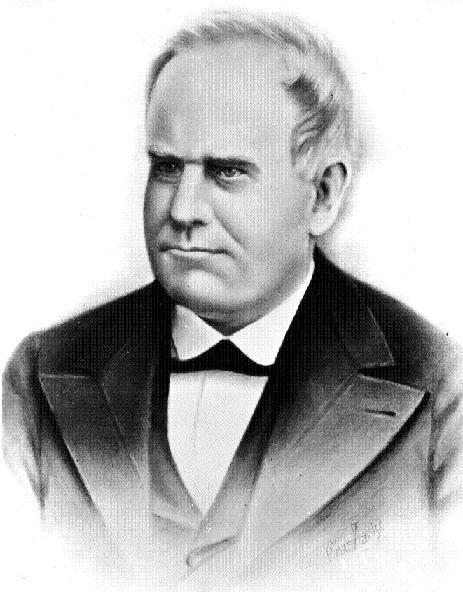
Nominee	Waldo P. Johnson	Alexander W. Doniphan	Thomas B. English
Party	Breckinridge Democratic	Constitutional Union	Douglas Democratic
1st ballot	—	26 (16.9%)	9 (5.8%)
15th ballot	81 (55.5%)	36 (24.6%)	29 (19.9%)
Nominee	James S. Green	John S. Phelps	Robert Wilson
Party	Breckinridge Democratic	Douglas Democratic	Constitutional Union
1st ballot	68 (44.2%)	13 (8.4%)	10 (6.5%)
15th ballot	—	—	—
Nominee	Willard P. Hall
Party	Douglas Democratic
1st ballot	8 (5.2%)
15th ballot	—
Senator before election
James S. Green
Democratic
Elected Senator
Waldo P. Johnson
Breckinridge Democratic

One-term Democrat James S. Green was elected in 1857 following the failure of the legislature to elect a senator in 1855.

Green's term expired on March 4, 1861. The Missouri General Assembly met in joint session on March 13 to hold an election for the next term. No candidate had a majority on the first ballot, necessitating several subsequent rounds of voting over the ensuing five days.

Green, Constitutional Unionist Alexander W. Doniphan, and Douglas Democrats John S. Phelps and Thomas B. English were the leading candidates on the first ballot, with several other candidates polling between one and 10 votes. Green's secessionist, proslavery views were an issue during the election; supporters argued that failure to re-elect the incumbent would be interpreted as a concession to the abolitionist movement.

Green's support dwindled over the first two days of balloting. On March 18, prior to the start of voting, his supporters withdrew his name in favor of Breckinridge Democrat Waldo P. Johnson, who was elected on the 15th ballot.

Johnson, a secessionist, did not attend the 37th Congress when it convened on July 4, 1861. He was expelled from the Senate on January 10, 1862, for supporting the Confederacy. Robert Wilson, who received 10 votes as a Constitutional Unionist on the first ballot, was appointed to Johnson's vacant seat pending a special election in 1863.

== New Hampshire ==
New Hampshire election
- June 13, 1860

Members of the New Hampshire General Court Majority in both houses needed to win
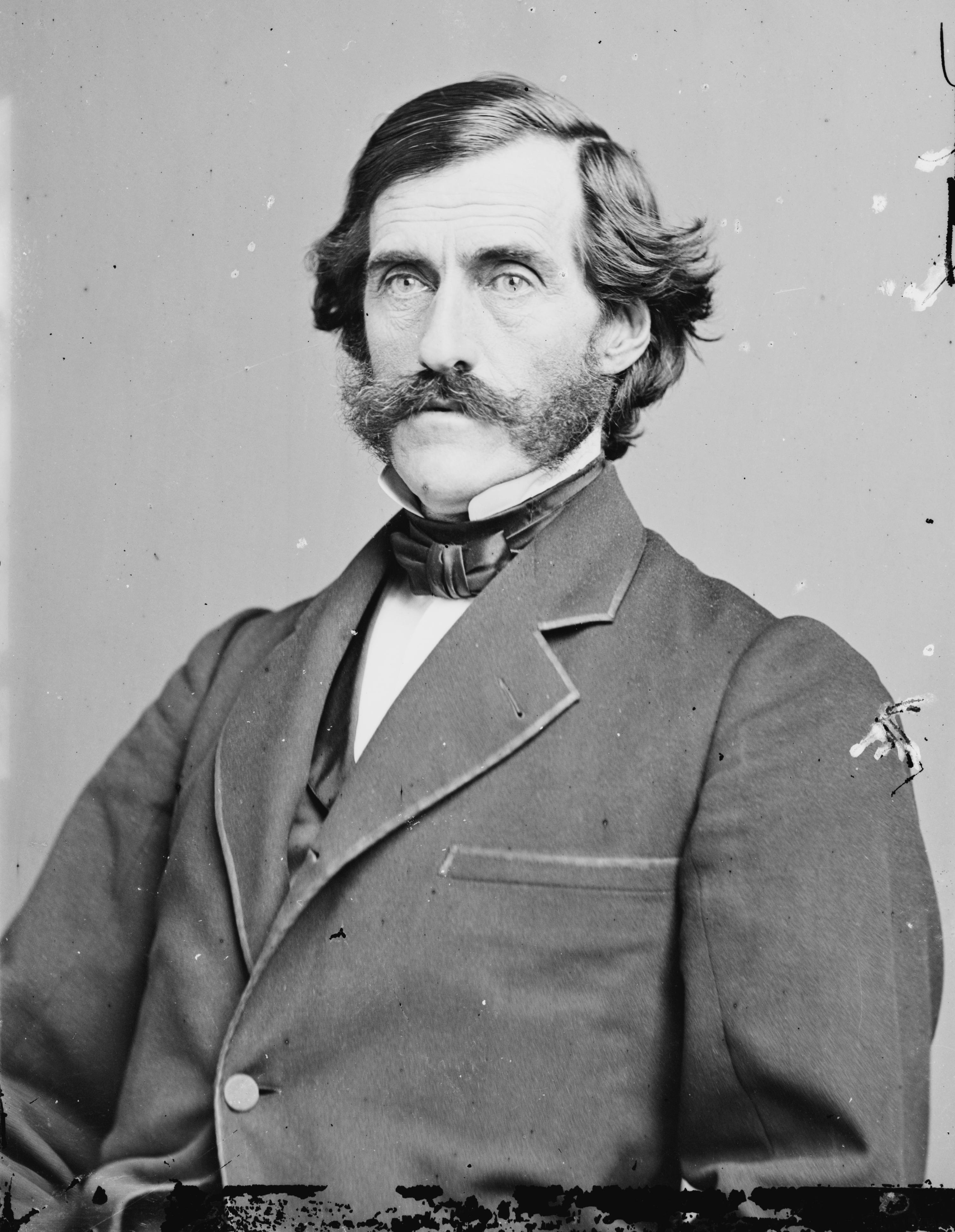

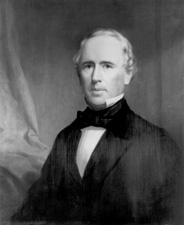
Nominee	Daniel Clark	John S. Wells
Party	Republican	Democratic
House	184 (62.6%)	108 (36.7%)
Senate	8 (80.0%)	2 (20.0%)
Senator before election
Daniel Clark
Republican
Elected Senator
Daniel Clark
Republican

Incumbent Republican Daniel Clark was elected in 1857 to fill the vacancy created by the death of James Bell.

The Republican members of the New Hampshire General Court nominated Clark for re-election at their caucus on June 12, 1861, in advance of the election. The Democrats nominated John S. Wells.

The Senate and the House of Representatives met separately on June 13, 1861, to hold an election for the next term. Clark defeated Wells on the first ballot.

== New York ==
New York election
- February 5, 1861

Members of the New York State Legislature Majority in both houses needed to win
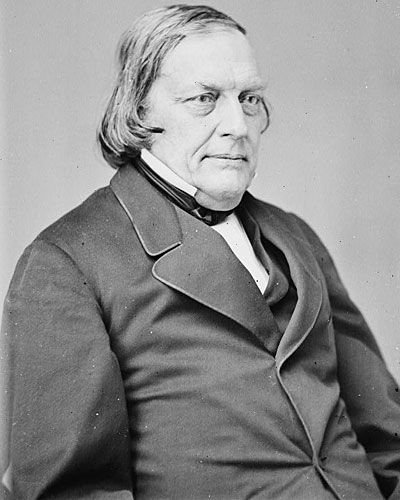

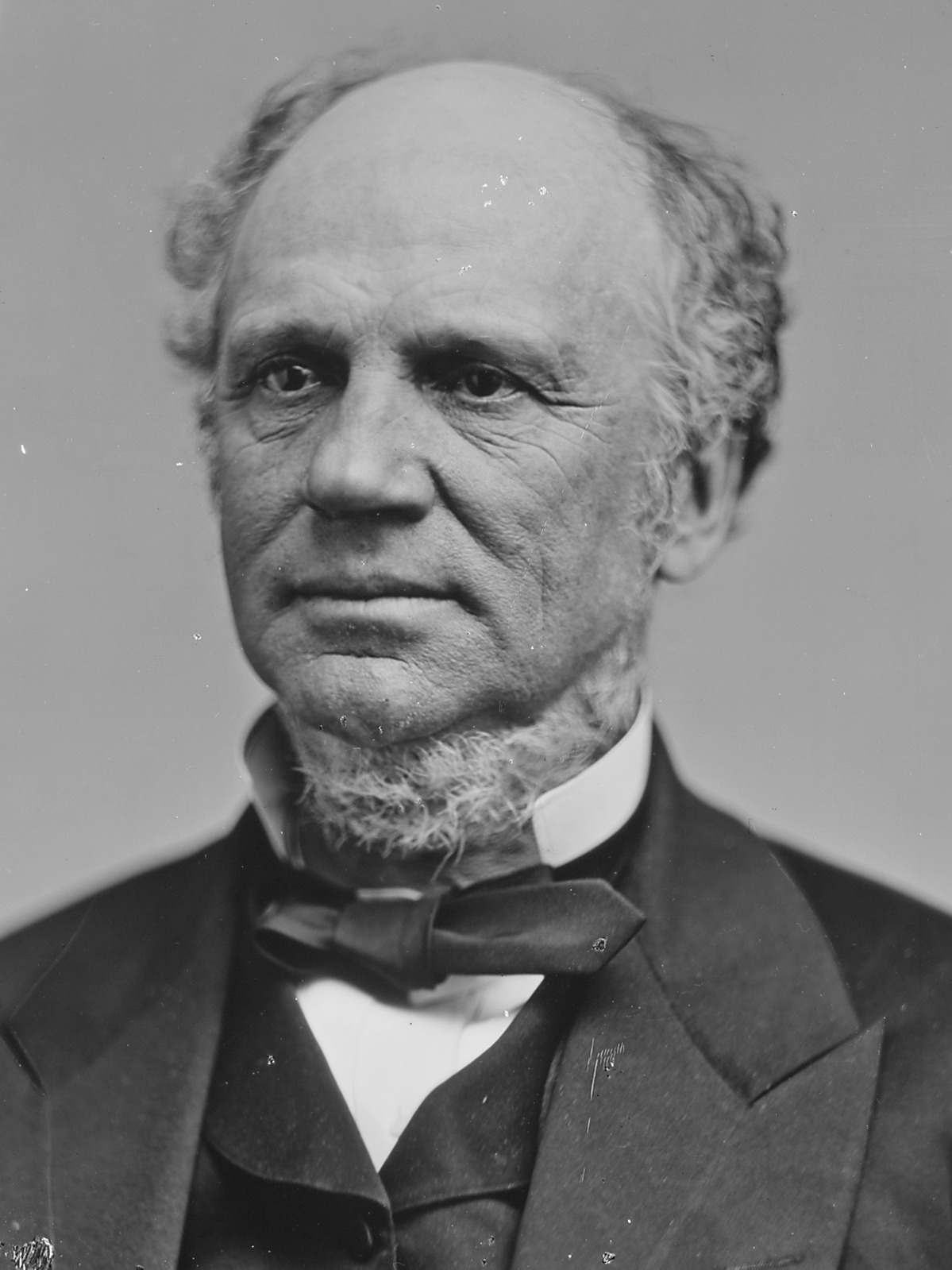
Nominee	Ira Harris	Horatio Seymour
Party	Republican	Democratic
Assembly	88 (73.9%)	31 (26.0%)
Senate	22 (71.0%)	9 (29.0%)
Senator before election
William H. Seward
Republican
Elected Senator
Ira Harris
Republican

Two-term Republican William H. Seward was re-elected in 1855. He was not a candidate for re-election.

The Senate and the Assembly met separately on February 5, 1861, to hold an election for the next term. The Republican candidate Ira Harris defeated the Democratic candidate Horatio Seymour on the first ballot.

== North Carolina ==
North Carolina election
- January 31, 1861

Members of the North Carolina General Assembly Majority of voting members needed to win
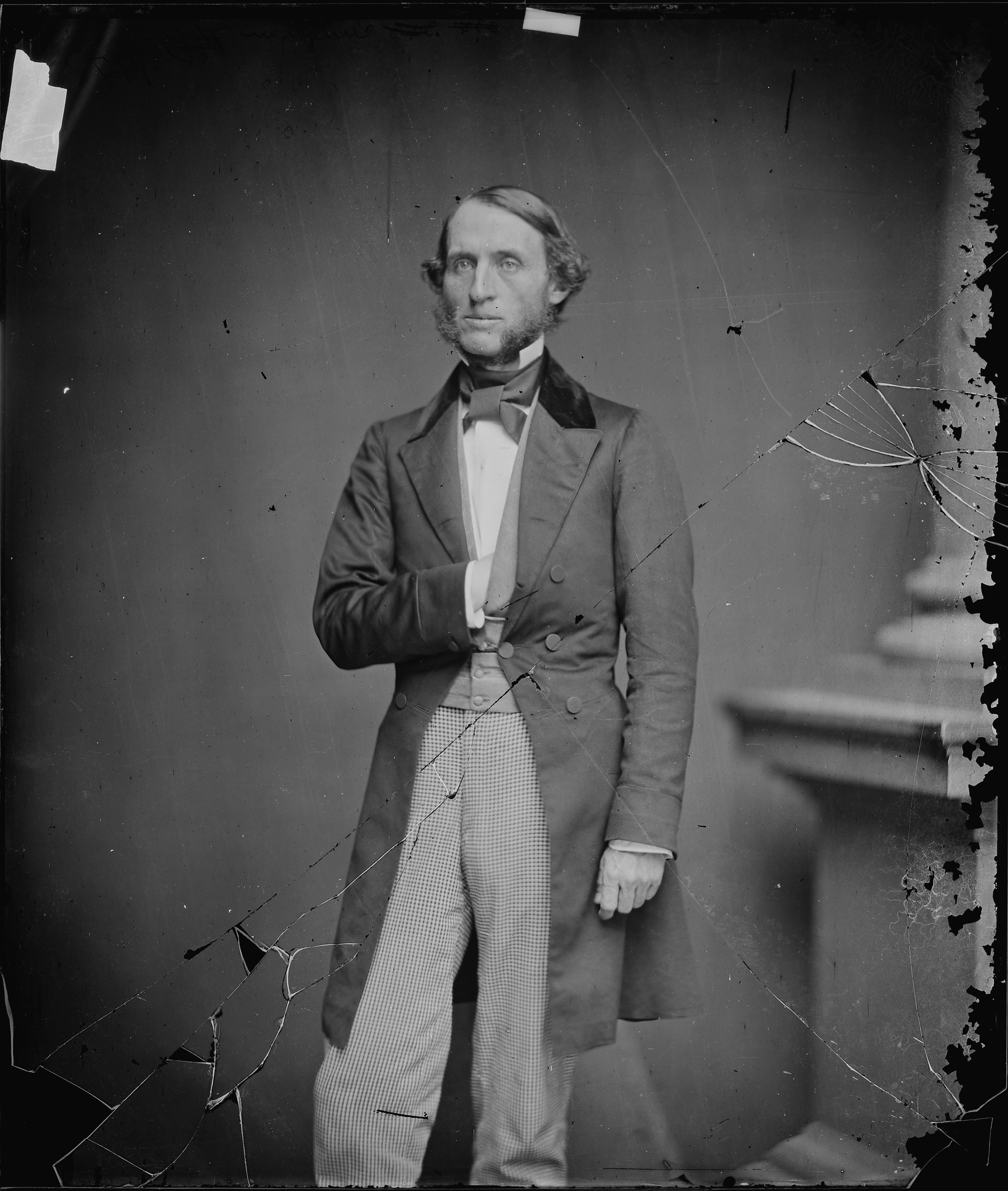

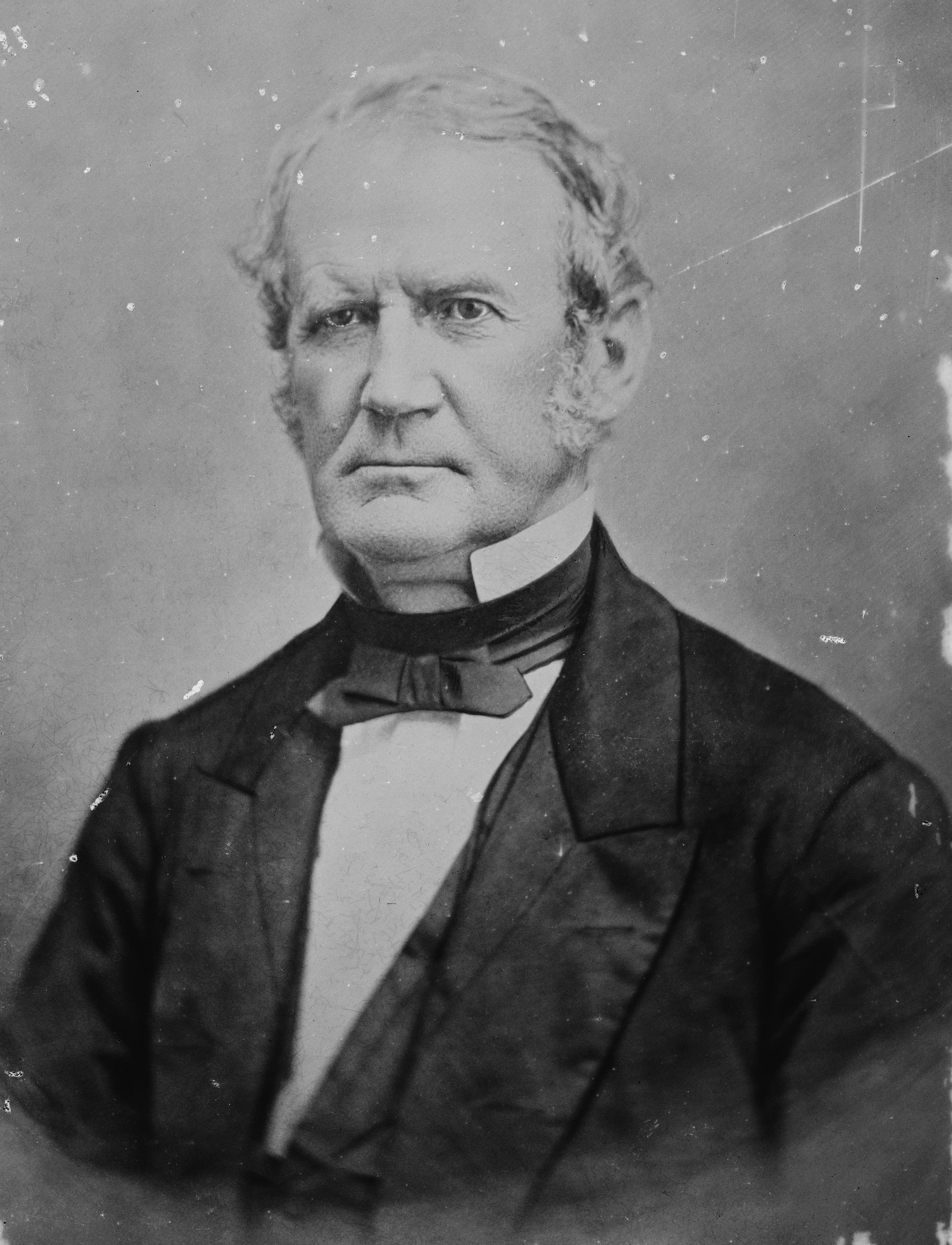

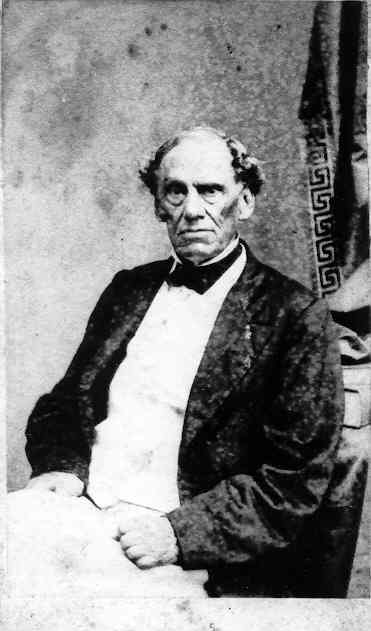

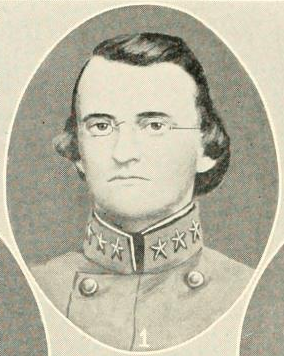
Nominee	Thomas L. Clingman	William A. Graham
Party	Democratic	Whig
1st ballot	85 (57.8%)	17 (11.6%)
Nominee	Bedford Brown	Sion H. Rogers
Party	Democratic	Whig
1st ballot	16 (10.9%)	11 (7.5%)
Senator before election
Thomas L. Clingman
Democratic
Elected Senator
Thomas L. Clingman
Democratic

Incumbent Democrat Thomas L. Clingman was elected in 1858 to fill the vacancy created by the resignation of Asa Biggs.

Although it declined nationally after 1855, the Whig Party survived in North Carolina and contested the 1860 state elections under its former name. Whigs elected 19 senators and 55 members of the House of Commons, holding the Democrats to narrow majorities in both chambers.

Clingman, a former Whig from Western North Carolina, was by 1860 the leader of the state's secessionist Democrats. Unionists in the North Carolina Senate attempted to draft Democrat Bedford Brown, but he declined consideration. Opposition to Clingman was divided and distracted by the proposal to call a state convention to consider secession which had passed the legislature on January 29.

The North Carolina General Assembly met on January 31, 1861, to hold an election for the next term. Voting proceeded separately in the Senate and the House of Commons, after which the votes were tallied jointly. Clingman and Whig Sion H. Rogers were nominated by members of the House of Commons, while Brown was nominated by the Senate. Clingman defeated his various rivals on the first ballot.

North Carolina seceded on May 20, 1861. Clingman did not attend the 37th Congress when it convened on July 4 and was expelled on July 11 for supporting the Confederacy.

== Ohio ==
Two elections were held in Ohio, due to the election and subsequent resignation of Salmon P. Chase.

=== Ohio (regular) ===
Ohio election
- February 3, 1860

Members of the Ohio General Assembly Majority of voting members needed to win
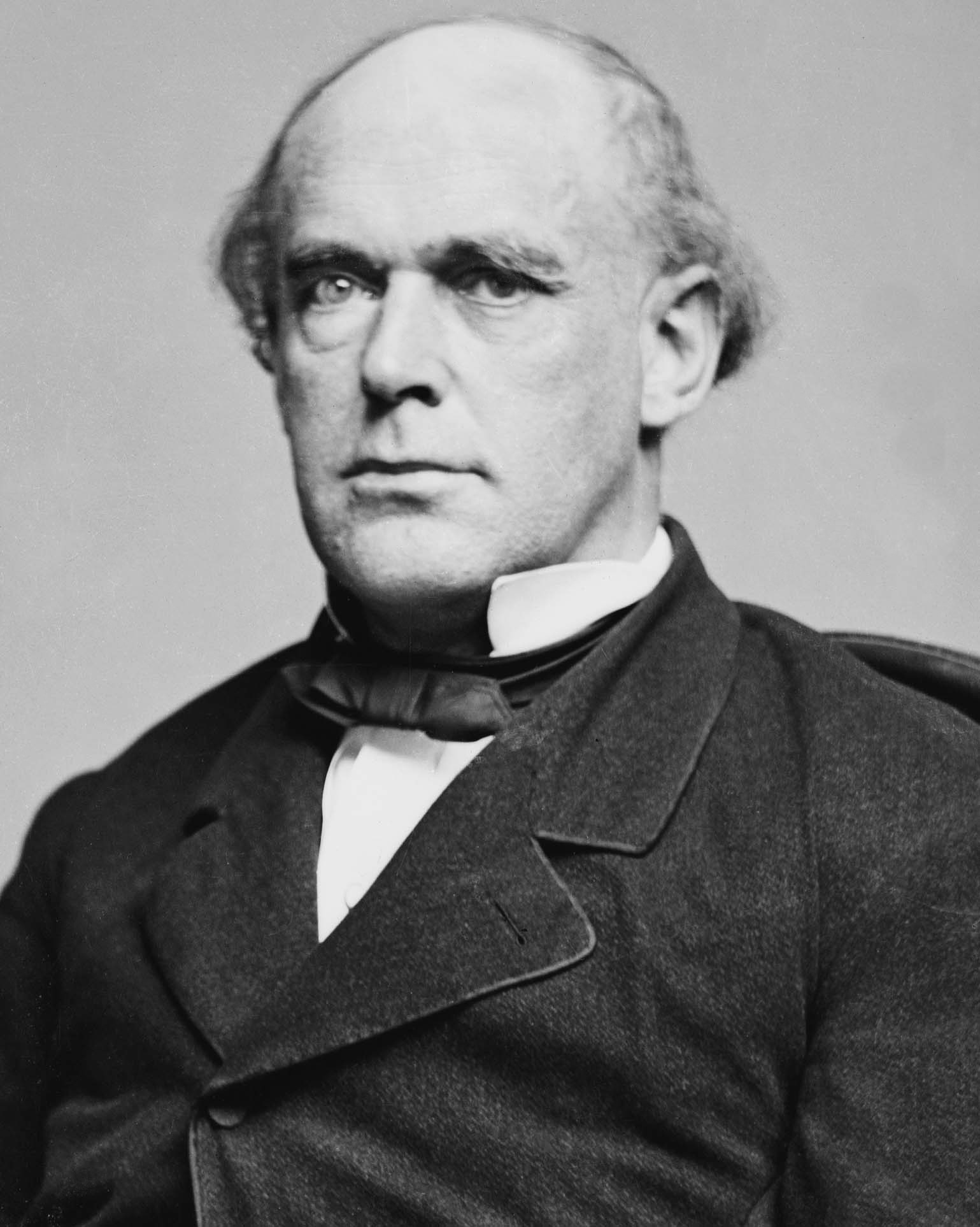

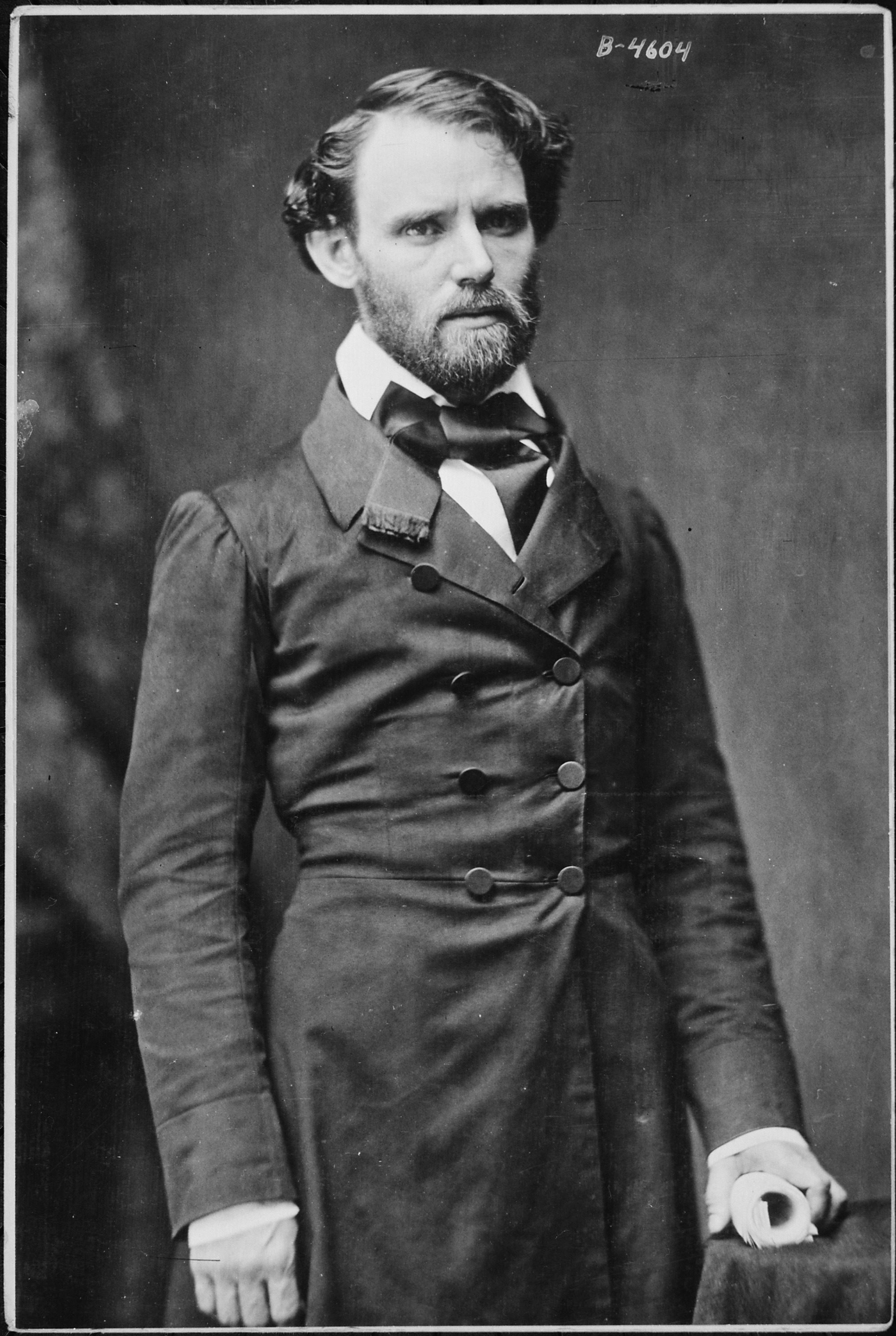
Nominee	Salmon P. Chase	George E. Pugh
Party	Republican	Democratic
1st ballot	76 (56.7%)	53 (39.6%)
Senator before election
George E. Pugh
Democratic
Elected Senator
Salmon P. Chase
Republican

One-term Democrat George E. Pugh was elected in 1854.

The Ohio General Assembly met in joint session on February 3, 1860, to hold an election for the next term. The Republican candidate Salmon P. Chase defeated Pugh on the first ballot.

=== Ohio (special) ===
Ohio special election
- March 21, 1861

Members of the Ohio General Assembly Majority of voting members needed to win
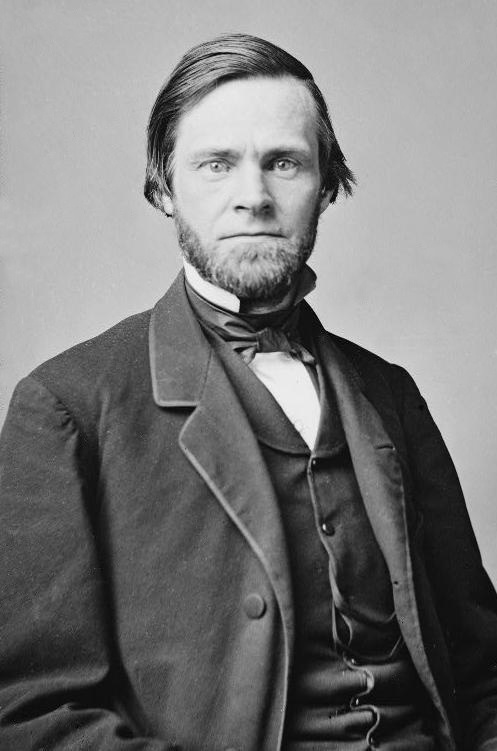

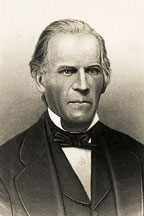
Nominee	John Sherman	William Kennon
Party	Republican	Democratic
1st ballot	76 (58.9%)	53 (41.1%)
Senator before election
None (vacant from March 6, 1861)
Elected Senator
John Sherman
Republican

Chase resigned from the Senate on March 6, 1861, following his appointment as U.S. secretary of the treasury.

The Ohio General Assembly met in joint session on March 21 to hold a special election for the unexpired term. The Republican candidate John Sherman defeated the Democratic candidate William Kennon on the first ballot.

== Oregon ==
There were two elections in Oregon, due to the vacancy of the Class 2 seat.

Democrats Joseph Lane and Delazon Smith were elected in 1858, Smith for the term ending March 3, 1859, and Lane for the term ending March 3, 1861. After the expiration of Smith's term, but before the 36th Congress convened, the governor of Oregon John Whiteaker called a special session of the Oregon Legislative Assembly in May 1859 to hold an election for the succeeding term. The Oregon Democratic Party was divided between partisans of Lane and Asahel Bush, who were identified with support or opposition to the Buchanan administration's policy on slavery in the U.S. territories, respectively. In the Democratic caucus, Smith, a Lane Democrat, was narrowly renominated with 22 out of 43 votes. The Bush Democrats subsequently refused to support Smith's re-election in the legislative joint session, and the legislature adjourned on July 4 without having elected a senator.

In the interim, Lane was nominated for vice president by the Breckinridge Democratic National Convention; the Lane faction became identified with Breckinridge's presidential candidacy in Oregon, while the Anti-Lane forces supported Stephen Douglas. In elections held in June 1860, an ad-hoc Anti-Lane coalition of Republicans and Douglas Democrats handed a decisive defeat to the Lane faction, which was reduced to a minority in the legislature. Besides their shared hatred of Lane, both groups opposed the United States Supreme Court's ruling in Dred Scott v. Sandford and supported popular sovereignty. The election of an Anti-Lane majority cleared the way for a cooperation between Republicans and Douglas Democrats in the upcoming senatorial elections.

The legislature met again in joint session on September 21, 1860, to hold concurrent elections for both seats. The combined membership of both chambers included 19 Lane Democrats, 18 Douglas Democrats, and 13 Republicans. In an attempt to prevent a quorum in the Senate, six Lane Democrats absented themselves from the proceedings; during their absence, the House of Representatives attempted to conduct the election, but no candidate for either seat gained a majority over twenty ballots.

At length, the absent senators were persuaded to return, and balloting resumed on October 1. A coalition between the Republicans and Douglas Democrats remained elusive until the following day, when Douglas Democrat James Nesmith and Republican Edward D. Baker were elected on the 14th (34th overall) ballot.

=== Oregon (regular) ===
Oregon election
- October 2, 1860

Members of the Oregon Legislative Assembly Majority of voting members needed to win
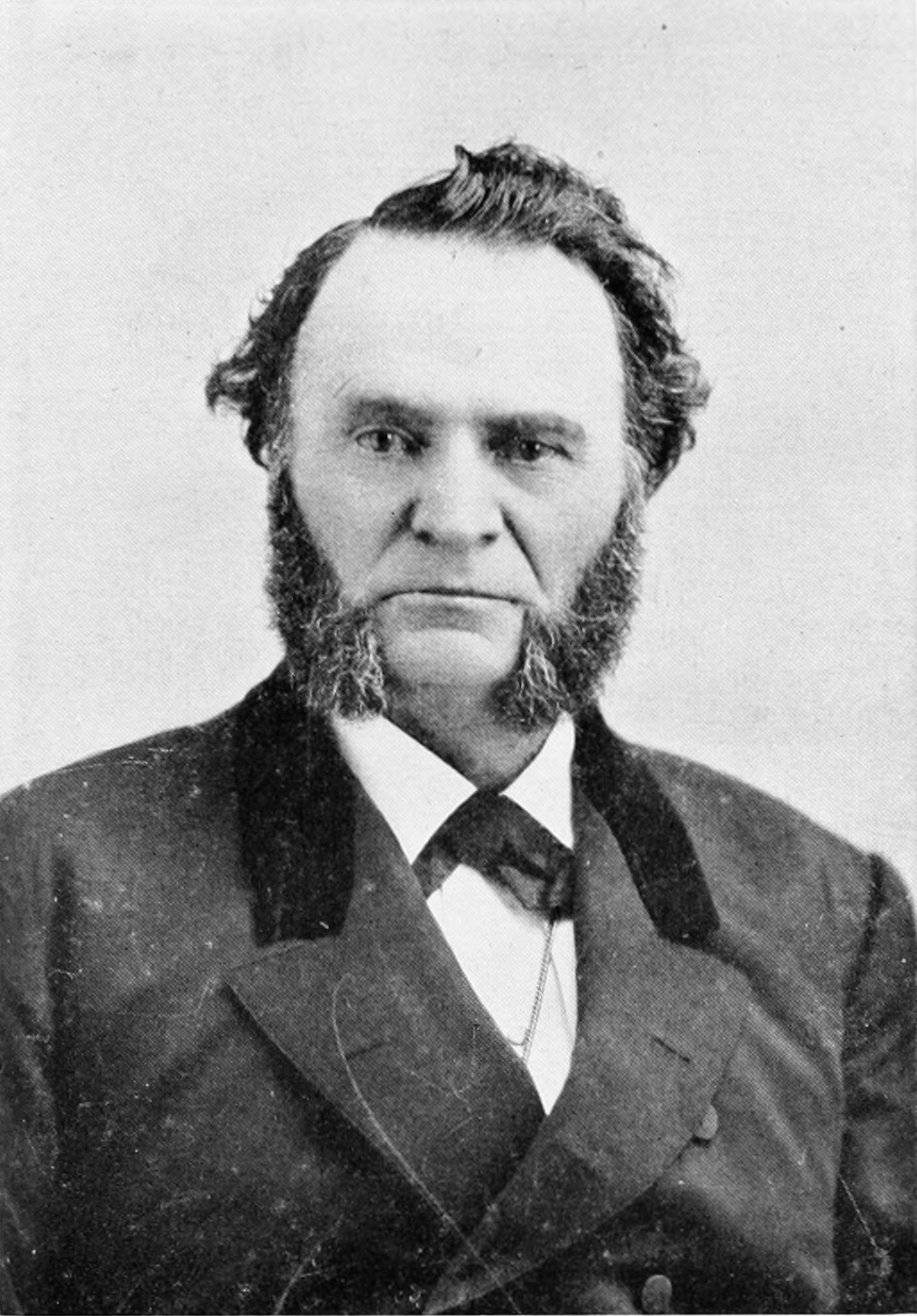

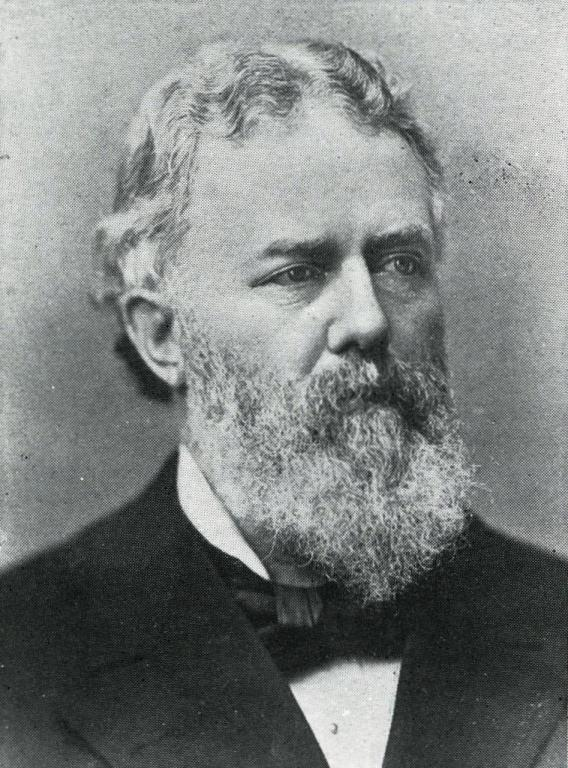

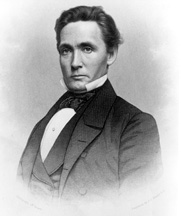

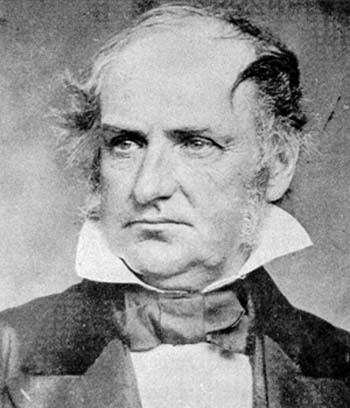
Nominee	James Nesmith	Matthew Deady
Party	Douglas Democratic	Breckinridge Democratic
1st ballot	16 (32.0%)	—
14th ballot	27 (54.0%)	22 (44.0%)
Nominee	Delazon Smith	Edward D. Baker
Party	Breckinridge Democratic	Republican
1st ballot	19 (38.0%)	12 (24.0%)
14th ballot	—	—
Senator before election
Joseph Lane
Democratic
Elected Senator
James Nesmith
Douglas Democratic

The incumbent Lane was not a candidate for re-election. Republican Edward D. Baker, Douglas Democrat James Nesmith, and Breckinridge Democrats Delazon Smith and Matthew Deady were the major candidates.

On October 2, Baker withdrew his candidacy for the Class 3 seat in order to seek election to the Class 2 seat. The Republican members switched their support to Nesmith, who was elected.

=== Oregon (special) ===
Oregon special election
- October 2, 1860

Members of the Oregon Legislative Assembly Majority of voting members needed to win
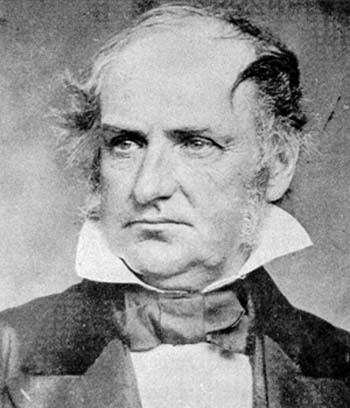

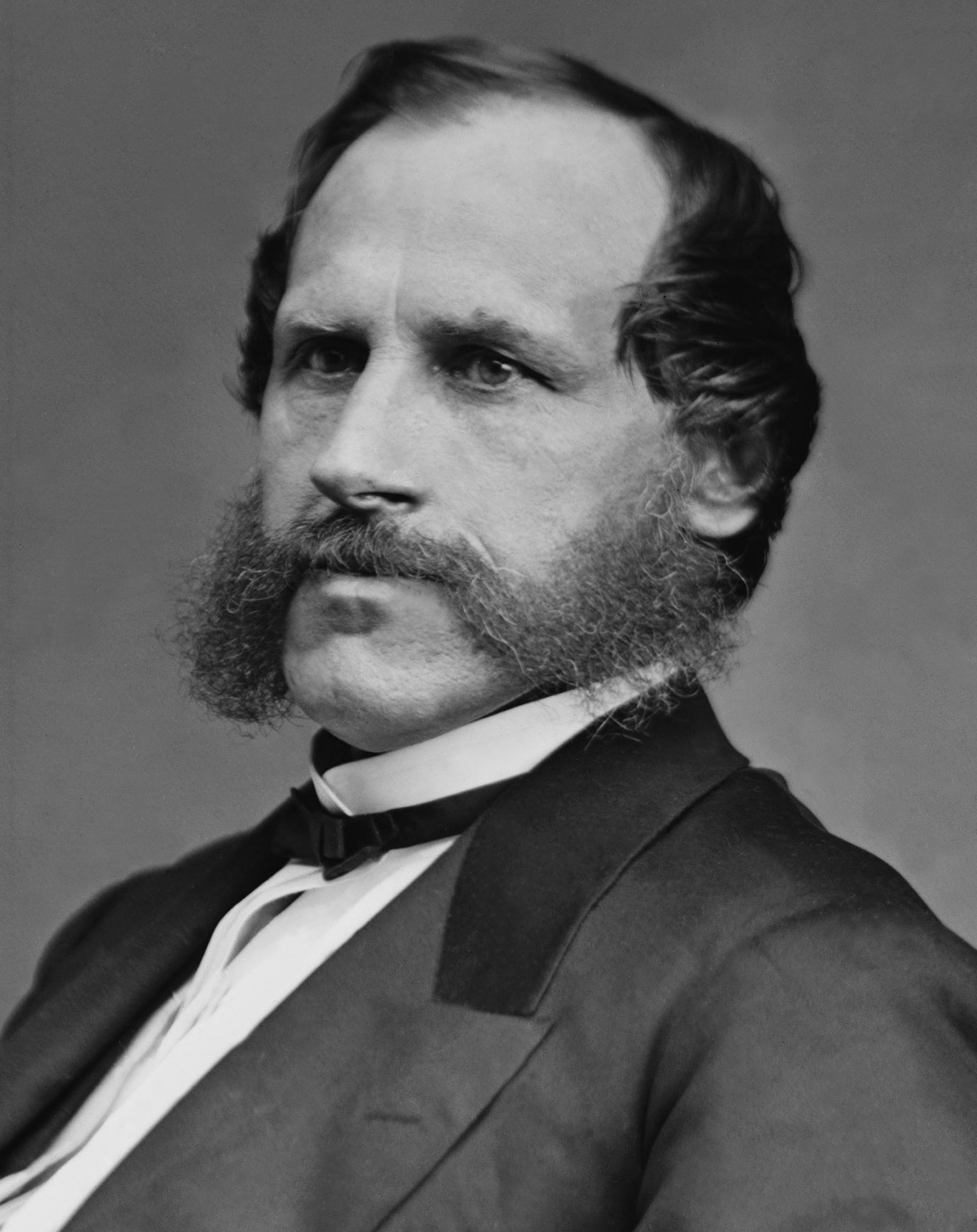

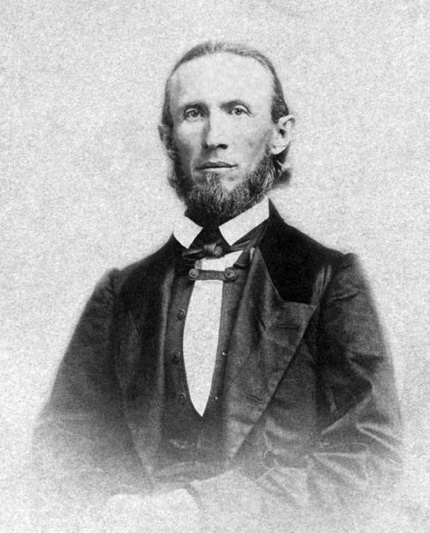

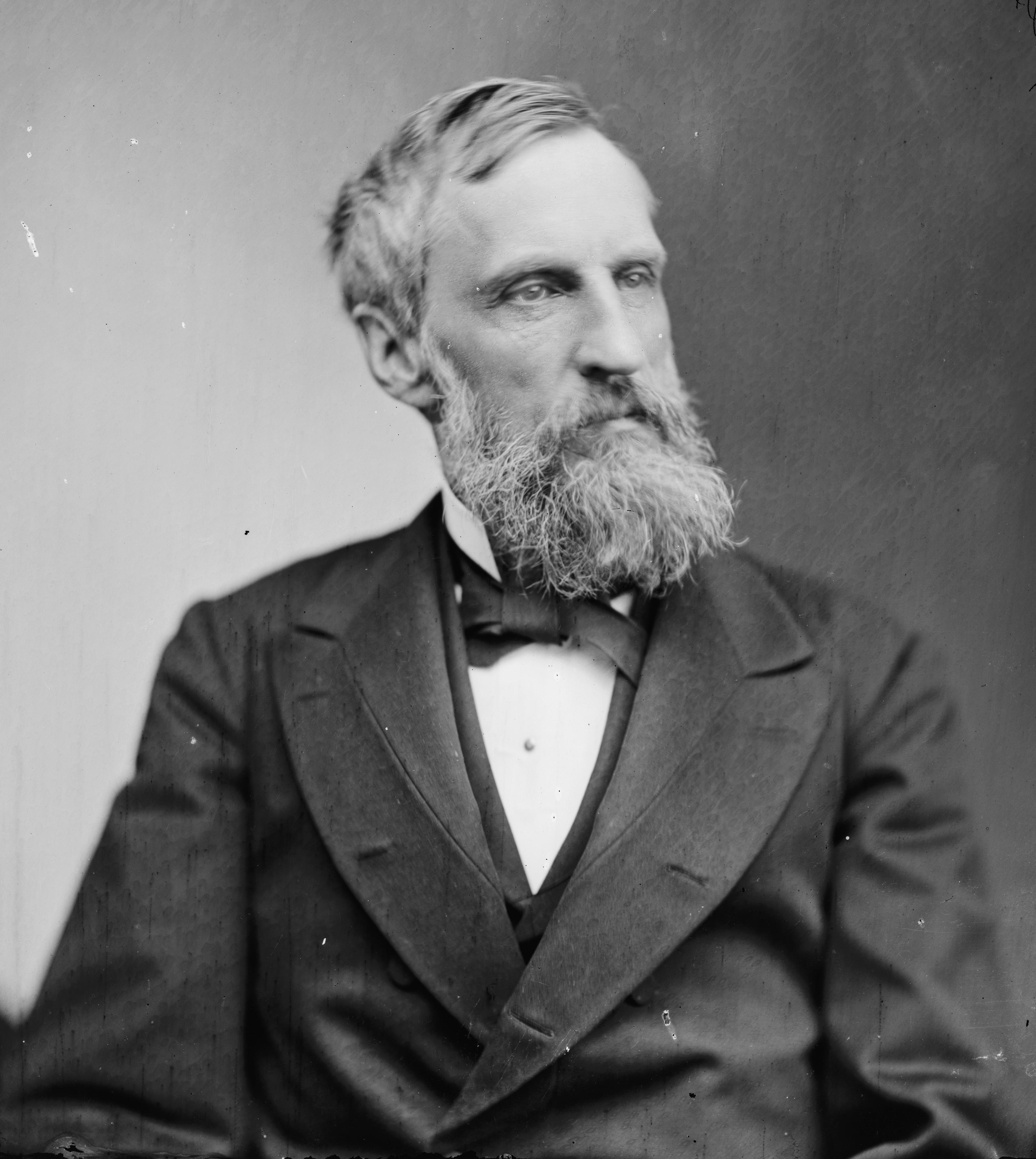

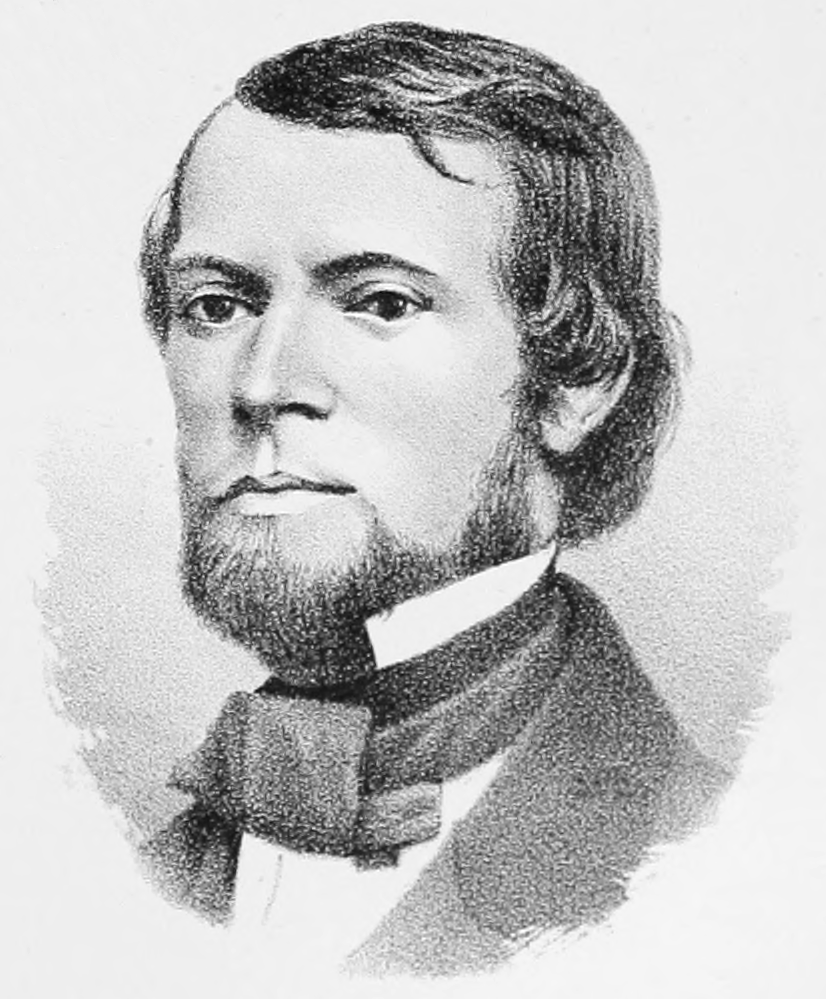
Nominee	Edward D. Baker	George H. Williams	George L. Curry
Party	Republican	Douglas Democratic	Breckinridge Democratic
1st ballot	—	11 (22.4%)	8 (16.3%)
14th ballot	26 (52.0%)	20 (40.0%)	2 (4.0%)
Nominee	La Fayette Grover	Amory Holbrook
Party	Douglas Democratic	Republican
1st ballot	16 (32.6%)	11 (22.4%)
14th ballot	—	—
Senator before election
None (vacant from March 4, 1859)
Elected Senator
Edward D. Baker
Republican

The term of the previous incumbent Smith ended on March 4, 1859, after which the seat was vacant.

Republican Amory Holbrook, Douglas Democrats George H. Williams and La Fayette Grover, and Breckinridge Democrat George L. Curry were the major candidates during the balloting on October 1.

On October 2, the Republican members switched their votes from Holbrook to Baker, who had withdrawn his candidacy for the Class 3 seat. Fifteen Douglas Democrats joined the Republicans to elect Baker. Holbrook, who thought fusion ill-advised and mistrusted Baker's Republican credentials, cast a blank ballot all through the voting on October 2.

== Pennsylvania ==
There were two elections in Pennsylvania, due to the resignation of Simon Cameron.

=== Pennsylvania (regular) ===
Pennsylvania election
- January 8, 1861

Members of the Pennsylvania General Assembly Majority of voting members needed to win
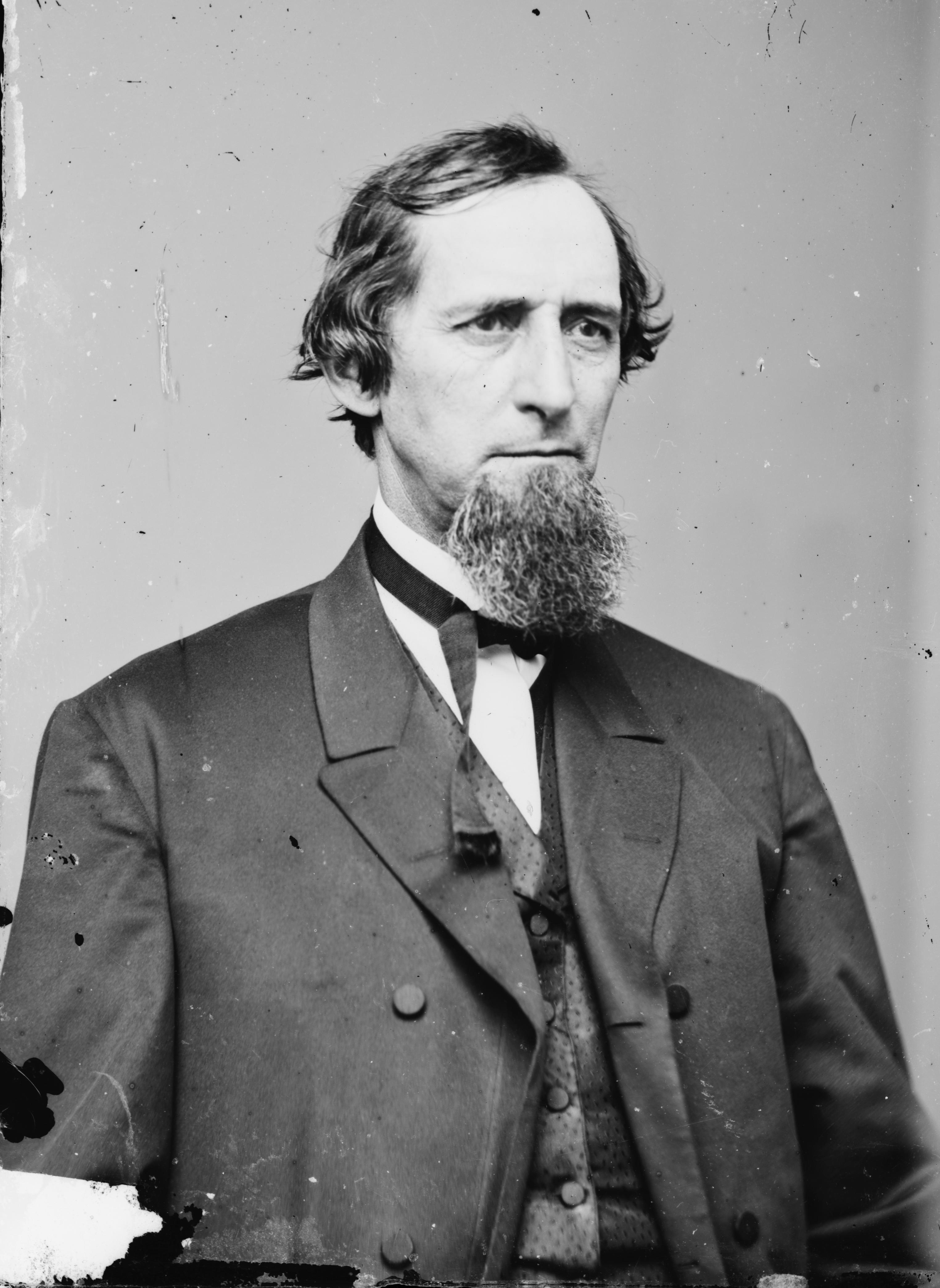

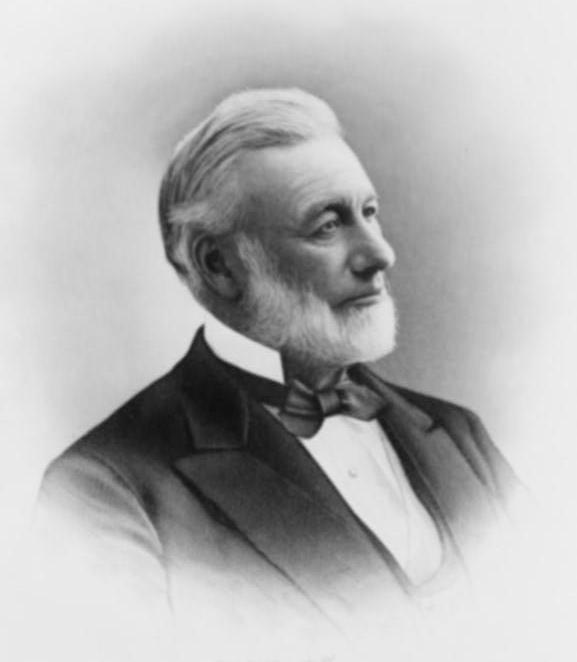
Nominee	Edgar Cowan	Henry D. Foster
Party	People's	Democratic
1st ballot	98 (73.7%)	35 (26.3%)
Senator before election
William Bigler
Democratic
Elected Senator
Edgar Cowan
People's

One-term Democrat William Bigler was elected in 1856 following the failure of the legislature to elect a senator in 1855.

The People's Party held a caucus on January 7, 1861, in advance of the election. Edgar Cowan and David Wilmot were the leading candidates. Wilmot was famous for his opposition to slavery in the U.S. territories and had the support of the incoming governor of Pennsylvania Andrew G. Curtin, but was opposed by conservative members who alleged his election would further antagonize the slave states. The junior U.S. senator from Pennsylvania Simon Cameron remained publicly neutral in the campaign for the Republican nomination while privately backing Cowan. In the caucus, Cowan defeated Wilmot on the sixth ballot with 58 votesto Wilmot's 38.

The Democrats selected Henry D. Foster over the incumbent Bigler.

The Pennsylvania General Assembly met in joint session on January 8, 1861, to hold an election for the next term. Cowan defeated Foster on the first ballot.

=== Pennsylvania (special) ===
Pennsylvania special election
- March 14, 1861

Members of the Pennsylvania General Assembly Majority of voting members needed to win
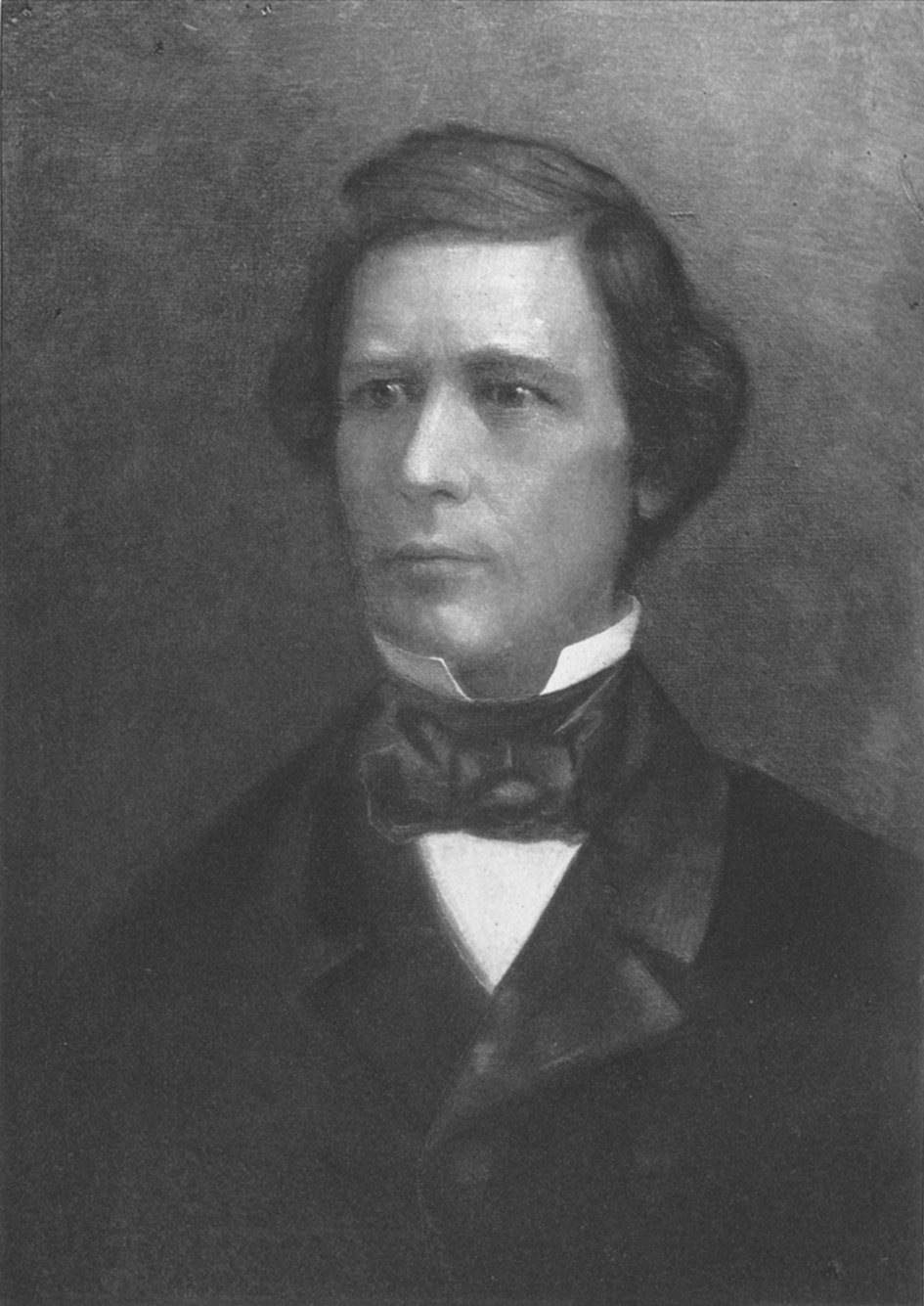

Nominee	David Wilmot	William H. Welsh
Party	People's	Democratic
1st ballot	95 (73.5%)	34 (26.0%)
Senator before election
None (vacant from March 4, 1861)
Elected Senator
David Wilmot
People's

One-term People's incumbent Simon Cameron was elected in 1857. Cameron resigned from the Senate on March 4, 1861, following his appointment as U.S. secretary of war.

Wilmot was nominated by the People's Party caucus on the first ballot with 76 votes to 21 for other candidates. The Democrats selected William H. Welsh after the frontrunner for the nomination, William H. Witte, withdrew.

The Pennsylvania General Assembly met in joint session on March 14, 1861, to hold a special election for the unexpired term. Wilmot defeated Welsh on the first ballot.

== South Carolina ==
South Carolina election
- No election
Senator before election
James H. Hammond
Democratic
Elected Senator
None (vacant from November 11, 1860)

Incumbent Democrat James H. Hammond was elected in 1857 to fill the vacancy created by the death of Andrew Butler. He withdrew from the Senate on November 11, 1860, in anticipation of the secession of South Carolina. The South Carolina General Assembly did not hold an election for the next term, and the seat remained vacant until 1868.

== Vermont ==
Vermont election
- October 16, 1860

Members of the Vermont General Assembly Majority in both houses needed to win
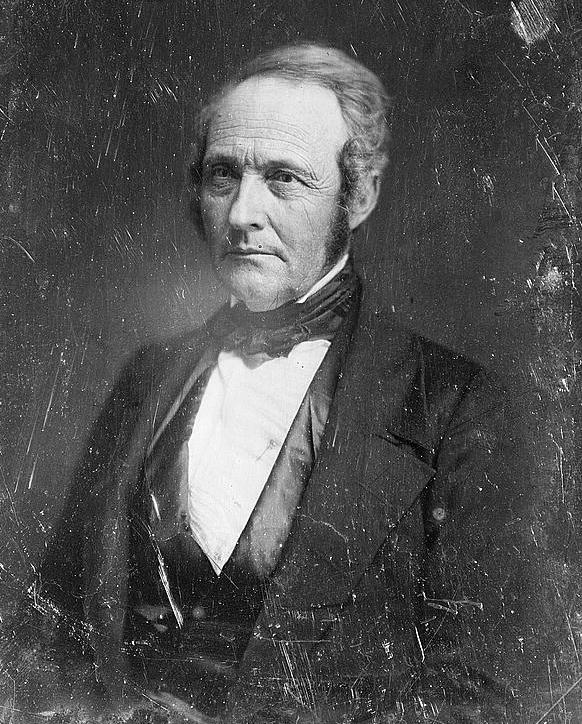

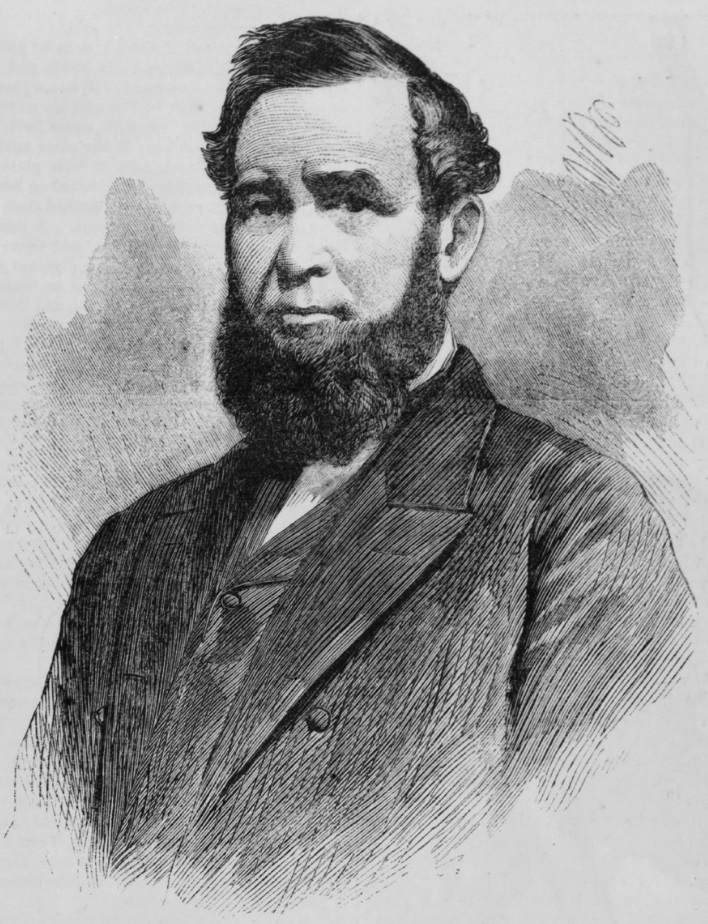
Nominee	Jacob Collamer	Paul Dillingham
Party	Republican	Democratic
House	198 (89.2%)	24 (10.8%)
Senate	27 (96.4%)	1 (3.6%)
Senator before election
Jacob Collamer
Republican
Elected Senator
Jacob Collamer
Republican

One-term Republican Jacob Collamer was elected in 1855.

The Republican members of the legislature held a caucus on October 15, 1860, in advance of the election; Collamer was nominated unanimously on the first ballot.

The Senate and the House of Representatives met separately on October 16, 1860, to hold an election for the next term. Collamer defeated the Democratic candidate Paul Dillingham the first ballot.

== Virginia (special) ==
Two special elections were held in Virginia, due to the expulsions of Robert M. T. Hunter and James M. Mason.

The Restored Virginia General Assembly met on July 9, 1861, to hold concurrent special elections for the unexpired terms. Voting proceeded separately in the Senate and the House of Delegates, after which the votes were tallied jointly. Waitman T. Willey and John S. Carlile were elected.

=== Virginia (Class 1) ===
Virginia special election
- July 9, 1861

Members of the Restored Virginia General Assembly Majority of voting members needed to win
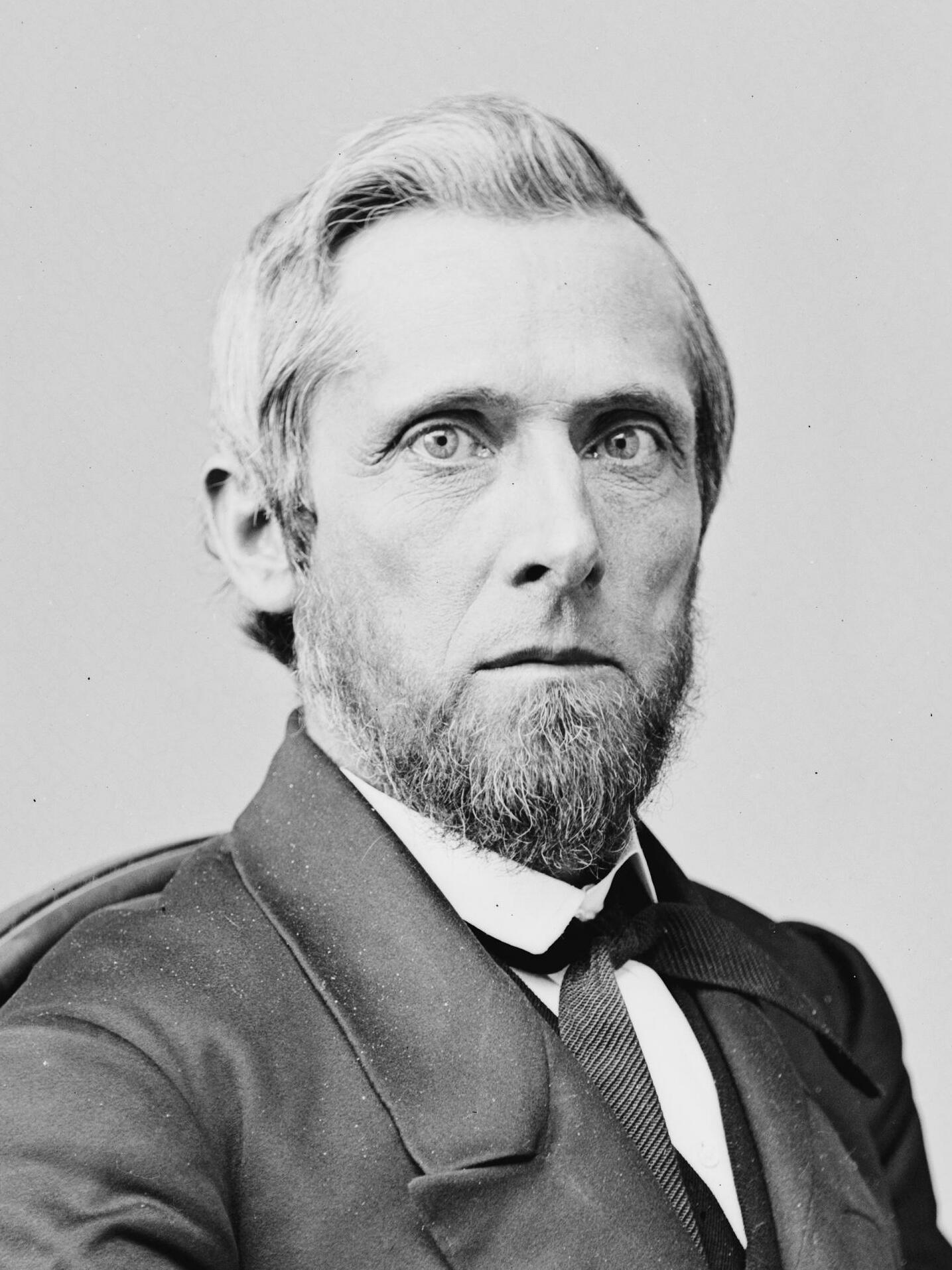

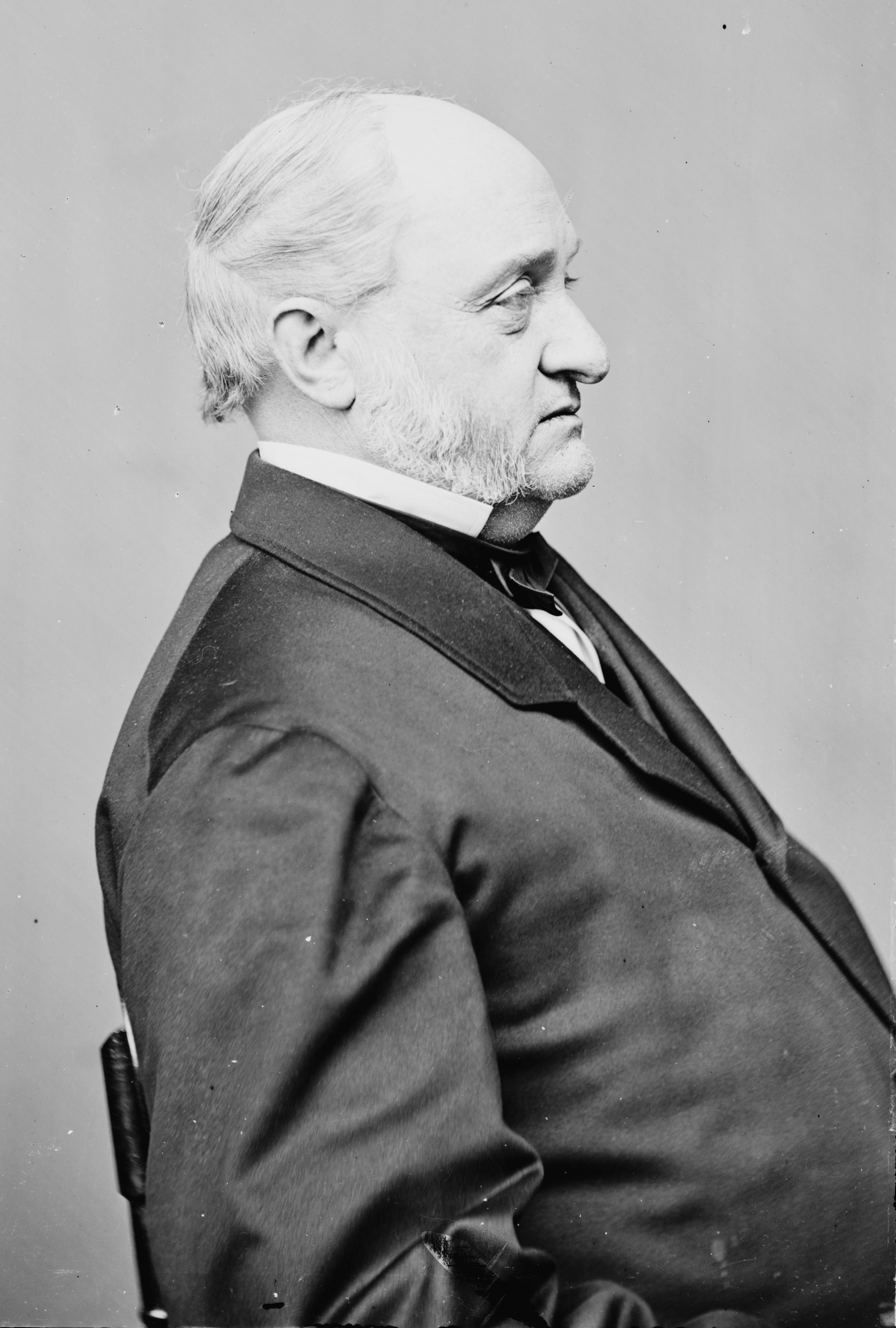

Nominee	Waitman T. Willey	Peter G. Van Winkle	Daniel Lamb
Party	Union	Union	Union
1st ballot	22 (57.9%)	10 (26.3%)	6 (15.8%)
Senator before election
James M. Mason
Democratic
Elected Senator
Waitman T. Willey
Union

Two-term Democrat James M. Mason was re-elected in 1856. Mason did not attend the 37th Congress when it convened on July 4, 1861, and was expelled on July 11 for supporting the Confederacy.

The Restored Virginia General Assembly met on July 9 to hold a special election for the unexpired term, anticipating Mason's expulsion. Unionist Waitman T. Willey defeated Peter G. Van Winkle and Daniel Lamb on the first ballot.

=== Virginia (Class 2) ===
Virginia special election
- July 9, 1861

Members of the Restored Virginia General Assembly Majority of voting members needed to win
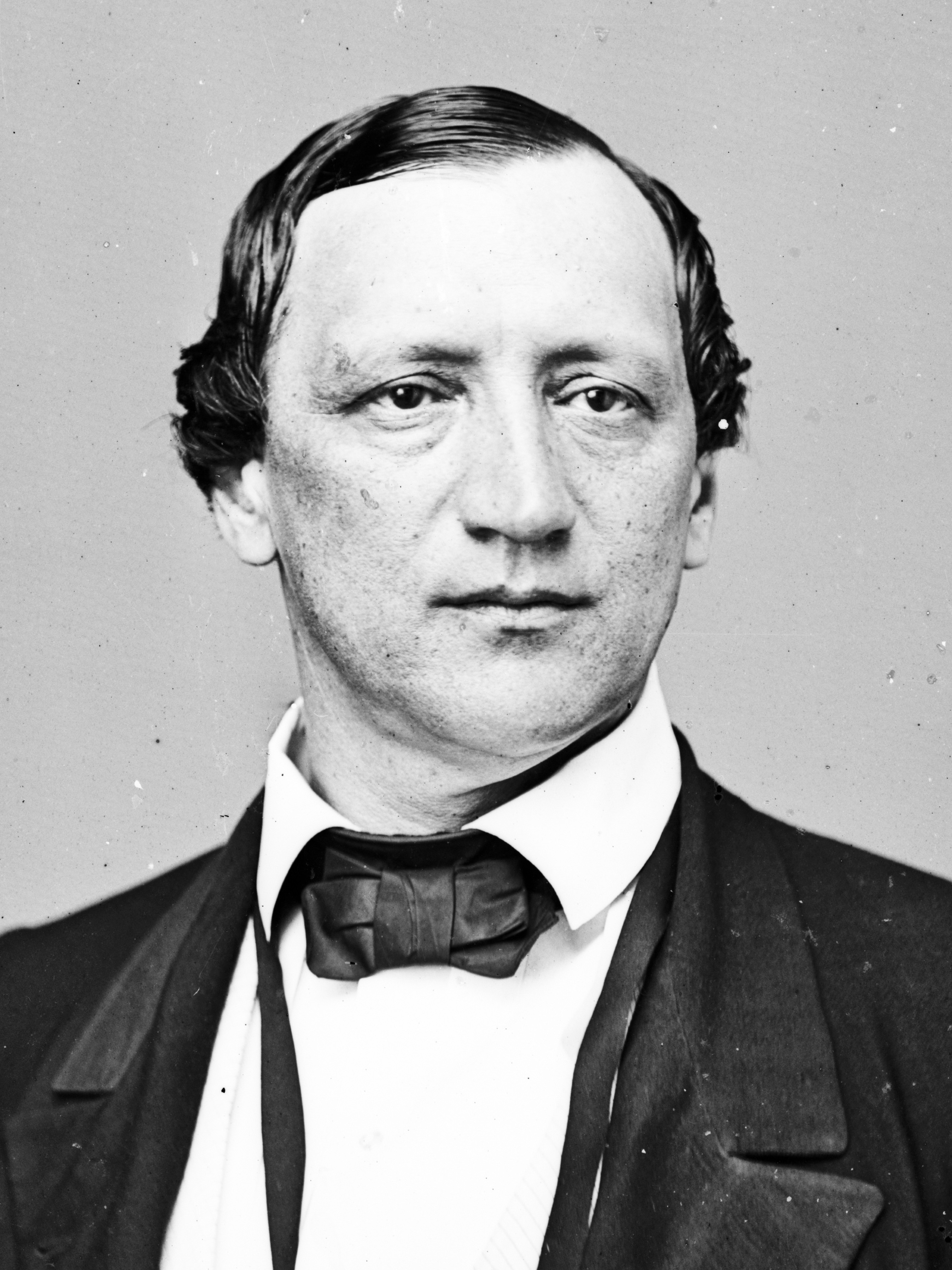
Nominee	John S. Carlile
Party	Union
1st ballot	38 (100.0%)
Senator before election
Robert M. T. Hunter
Democratic
Elected Senator
John S. Carlile
Union

Three-term Democrat Robert M. T. Hunter was re-elected in 1858. Hunter did not attend the 37th Congress when it convened on July 4, 1861, and was expelled on July 11 for supporting the Confederacy.

The Restored Virginia General Assembly met on July 9 to hold a special election for the unexpired term, anticipating Hunter's expulsion. Unionist John S. Carlile was elected unanimously on the first ballot.

== Wisconsin ==
Wisconsin election
- January 23, 1861

Members of the Wisconsin Legislature Majority of voting members needed to win
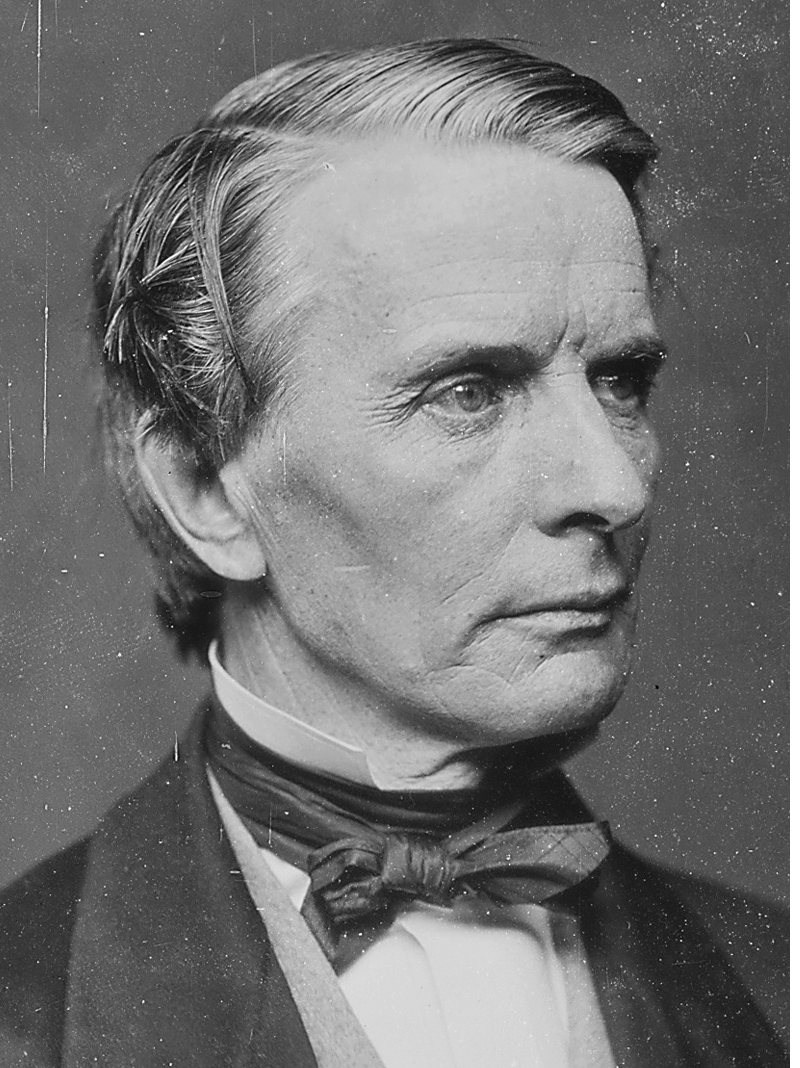

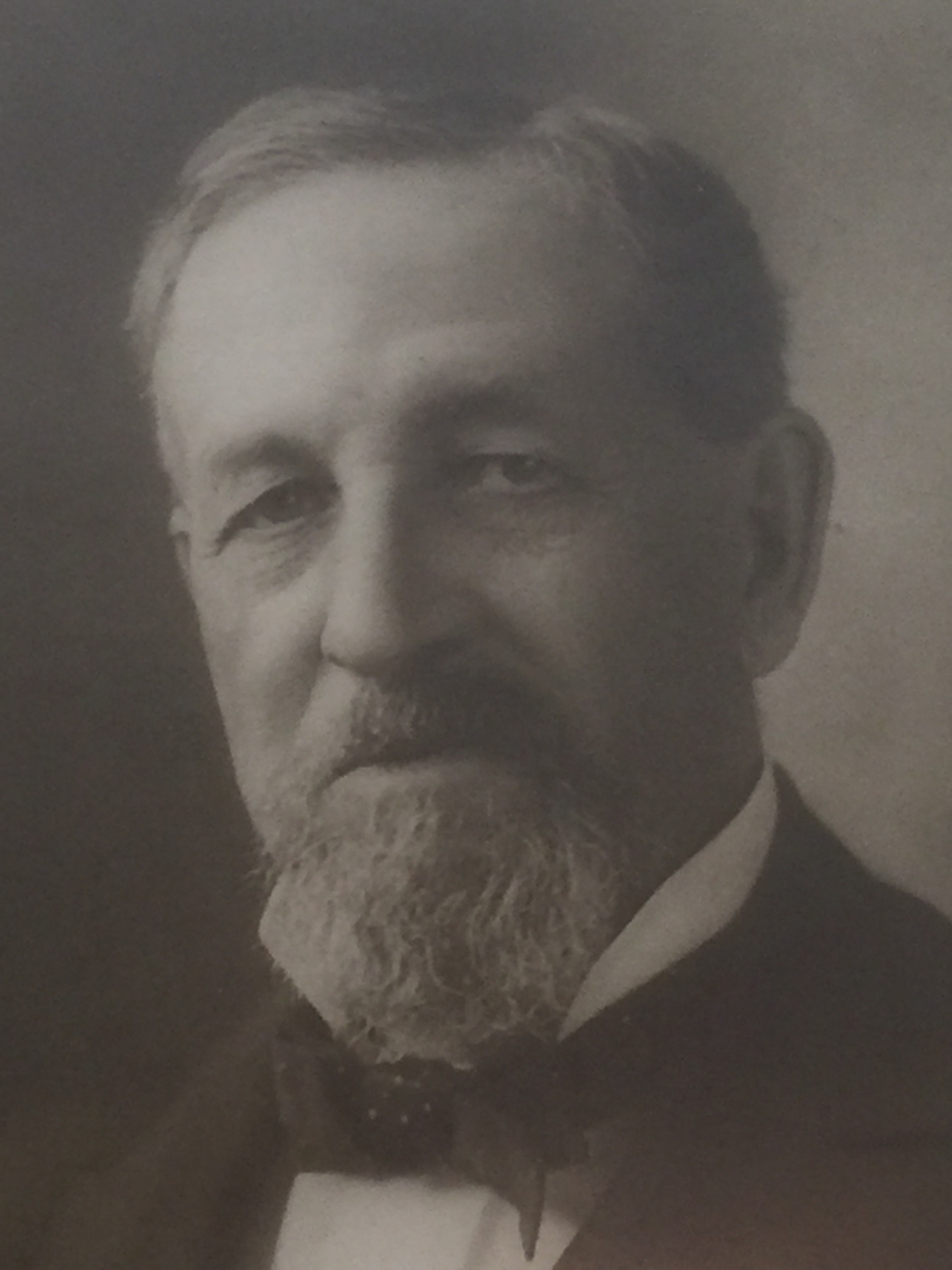
Nominee	Timothy O. Howe	Henry L. Palmer
Party	Republican	Democratic
1st ballot	92 (73.0%)	34 (27.0%)
Senator before election
Charles Durkee
Republican
Elected Senator
Timothy O. Howe
Republican

One-term Republican Charles Durkee was elected in 1855. He was not a candidate for re-election.

The Republican members of the legislature held a caucus from January 17–22, 1861, in advance of the election. Timothy O. Howe, Cadwallader C. Washburn, and Alexander W. Randall were the leading candidates. Voting continued for several days with no result. Randall eventually withdrew his candidacy in favor of Howe, who defeated Washburn on the final ballot with 52 votes to 36 for Washburn, and three abstentions.

The Wisconsin Legislature met in joint session on January 23, 1861, to hold an election for the next term. Howe defeated the Democratic candidate Henry L. Palmer on the first ballot.

== See also ==
- 1860 United States elections
  - 1860 United States presidential election
  - 1860–61 United States House of Representatives elections
- 36th United States Congress
- 37th United States Congress

== Bibliography ==
=== Primary sources ===
- Arkansas (1861). Journal of the House of Representatives [...]. n.p.
- California (1860). Journal of the House of Assembly of California [...] (PDF). Sacramento.
- California (1861). Journal of the House of Assembly of California [...] (PDF). Sacramento.
- Evening Journal Almanac (1861). Evening Journal Almanac: 1861. Albany.
- Evening Journal Almanac (1862). Evening Journal Almanac: 1862. Albany.
- Greeley, Horace, ed. (1861). Tribune Almanac for 1861. New York.
- Greeley, Horace, ed. (1862). Tribune Almanac for 1862. New York.
- Illinois (1861). Journal of the House of Representatives [...]. Springfield.
- Iowa (1860). Journal of the House of Representatives [...]. Des Moines.
- Kansas (1861). House Journal [...]. Lawrence.
- Kentucky (1859). Journal of the House of Representatives [...]. Frankfort.
- Kentucky (1861). Journal of the House of Representatives [...]. Frankfort.
- Maryland (1860). Journal of the Proceedings of the House of Delegates. Annapolis.
- New Hampshire (1860a). Journal of the House of Representatives [...]. Concord.
- New Hampshire (1860b). Journal of the Honorable Senate [...]. Concord.
- New York (1861a). Journal of the Assembly [...]. Albany.
- New York (1861b). Journal of the Senate [...]. Albany.
- North Carolina (1861). Journal of the Senate [...]. Raleigh.
- Ohio (1860). Journal of the House of Representatives [...]. Columbus.
- Ohio (1861). Journal of the House of Representatives [...]. Columbus.
- Oregon (1860). Journal of the Proceedings of the Senate of the Legislative Assembly of Oregon [...]. Salem.
- Pennsylvania (1861). Journal of the House of Representatives [...]. Harrisburg.
- Restored Government of Virginia (1861). Journal of the House of Delegates [...]. Wheeling.
- Wisconsin (1861). Journal of the Assembly of Wisconsin. Madison.

=== Secondary sources ===
- Baker, Jean H. (1973). The Politics of Continuity: Maryland Political Parties from 1858 to 1870. Baltimore: Johns Hopkins University Press.
- Bradley, Erwin Stanley (1964). The Triumph of Militant Republicanism: A Study of Pennsylvania and Presidential Politics, 1860–1872. Philadelphia: University of Pennsylvania Press.
- Buchanan, Russell (September 1936). "James A. McDougall: A Forgotten Senator". California Historical Society Quarterly. 15 (3): 199–212.
- Carey, Charles Henry (1922). History of Oregon. Chicago: Pioneer Historical Publishing Company.
- Collins, Lewis; Collins, Richard H. (1924). History of Kentucky. Vol. 1. Louisville: John P. Morton and Company.
- Congressional Quarterly (1985). Congressional Quarterly's Guide to U.S. Elections (2nd ed.). Washington D.C.: Congressional Quarterly. ISBN 978-0-87187-339-2.
- Davis, William C. (2010). Breckinridge: Statesman, Soldier, Symbol. Lexington: University Press of Kentucky.
- Ferguson, John F. (1965). Arkansas and the Civil War. [Little Rock, AR]: [Pioneer Press]. LCCN 64-25874.
- Gaeddert, G. Raymond (1940). The Birth of Kansas. Lawrence: University of Kansas.
- Hittell, Theodore H. (1898). History of California. San Francisco.
- Inscoe, John C. (1989). Mountain Masters, Slavery, and the Sectional Crisis in Western North Carolina. Knoxville: University of Tennessee Press.
- Johannsen, Robert W. (1955). Frontier Politics and the Sectional Conflict: The Pacific Northwest on the Eve of the Civil War. Seattle: University of Washington Press.
- Kruman, Mark W. (1983). Parties and Politics in North Carolina, 1836–1865. Baton Rouge: Louisiana State University Press.
- McPherson, James M. (1988). Battle Cry of Freedom: The Civil War Era. New York: Oxford University Press.
- National Archives (February 8, 2022). "17th Amendment to the U.S. Constitution: Direct Election of U.S. Senators (1913)". National Archives and Records Administration.
- Parrish, William E. (1971). A History of Missouri, Volume 3: 1860 to 1875. Columbia, Missouri: University of Missouri Press.
- Parrish, William E. (1963). Turbulent Partnership: Missouri and the Union, 1861–1865. Columbia: University of Missouri Press.
- Taft, George S.; Furber, George P.; Buck, George M. (1903). Compilation of Senate Election Cases from 1789 to 1885. Washington, D.C.: Government Printing Office.
- Thornbrough, Emma Lou (1995). Indiana in the Civil War Era, 1850–1880. Indianapolis: Indiana Historical Society.
- Switzler, W. F. (1879). "Chapter 26". In Barns, C. R. (ed.). Switzler's History of Missouri from 1541 to 1877. St. Louis. pp. 303–21.
- Walton, Brian G. (April 1976). "Elections to the United States Senate in North Carolina, 1835-1861". North Carolina Historical Review. 53 (2): 168–92.
