= List of elections in 1859 =

The following elections occurred in the year 1859.

- 1859 Argentine presidential election
- 1859 Belgian general election
- 1859 Costa Rican general election
- 1859 Faroese general election
- 1859 Greek parliamentary election
- 1859 Liberian general election
- 1859 Newfoundland general election
- 1859 Norwegian parliamentary election
- 1859 Salvadoran presidential election

== North America ==
=== Canada ===
- 1859 Newfoundland general election

=== United States ===
- 1859 New York state election

==== United States Senate ====
- 1858 and 1859 United States Senate elections
- 1859 United States Senate election in Massachusetts
- 1859 United States Senate election in Minnesota

==== United States House of Representatives ====
- 1859 United States House of Representatives election in California
- 1858 and 1859 United States House of Representatives elections

==== United States lieutenant gubernatorial ====
- 1859 California lieutenant gubernatorial election
- 1859 Connecticut lieutenant gubernatorial election
- 1859 Minnesota lieutenant gubernatorial election
- 1859 Texas lieutenant gubernatorial election
- 1859 Wisconsin lieutenant gubernatorial election

==== United States gubernatorial ====
- 1859 Alabama gubernatorial election
- 1859 California gubernatorial election
- 1859 Connecticut gubernatorial election
- 1859 Georgia gubernatorial election
- 1859 Iowa gubernatorial election
- 1859 Kansas gubernatorial election
- 1859 Kentucky gubernatorial election
- 1859 Louisiana gubernatorial election
- 1859 Maine gubernatorial election
- 1859 Massachusetts gubernatorial election
- 1859 Minnesota gubernatorial election
- 1859 Mississippi gubernatorial election
- 1859 New Hampshire gubernatorial election
- 1859 New Jersey gubernatorial election
- 1859 Ohio gubernatorial election
- 1859 Rhode Island gubernatorial election
- 1859 Texas gubernatorial election
- 1859 Vermont gubernatorial election
- 1859 Virginia gubernatorial election
- 1859 Wisconsin gubernatorial election

==== United States mayoral elections ====
- 1859 Boston mayoral election
- 1859 Chicago mayoral election
- 1861 Manchester, New Hampshire election
- 1859 New York City mayoral election

== Europe ==
=== United Kingdom ===
- 1859 Irish (UK) general election
- 1859 United Kingdom general election

== See also ==
- Category:1859 elections
