= 1858 United States elections =

- ← 1856 1857 1858 1859 1860 → Midterm elections
- Incumbent president: ▌James Buchanan (D)
- Next Congress: 36th

Senate elections
- Overall control: Democratic hold
- Seats contested: 22 of 66 seats
- Net seat change: Republican +5

House elections
- Overall control: Republican gain
- Seats contested: All 238 voting seats
- Net seat change: Republican +23
- 1858–59 U.S. House of Representatives election Democratic gain Democratic hold Republican gain Republican hold Independent gain Opposition gain Know Nothing hold

Elections occurred in the middle of Democratic President James Buchanan's term and marked the end of the transitional period between the Second Party System and the Third Party System. Members of the 36th United States Congress were chosen in this election. In the first election since the Supreme Court decided Dred Scott v. Sandford, the Republican Party won a plurality in the House, taking control of a chamber of Congress for the first time in the party's history. Although Democrats lost control of the House, they retained their majority in the Senate.

In the House, Democrats suffered a major defeat, losing seats to Republicans and a group of southern party members who opposed secession, running on the Opposition Party ticket. Although no party won a majority, Republicans won a plurality of seats. Republican William Pennington won election as Speaker of the House, becoming the first Republican Speaker.

In the Senate, Republicans picked up several seats, but Democrats retained a commanding majority. Nonetheless the gains were a major win for Republicans who had benefitted from the fallout of the Dred Scott ruling.

== See also ==
- 1858–59 United States House of Representatives elections
- 1858–59 United States Senate elections
