= 1860 United States Senate special election in Oregon =

- October 2, 1860

50 members of the Oregon Legislative Assembly Majority of voting members needed to win
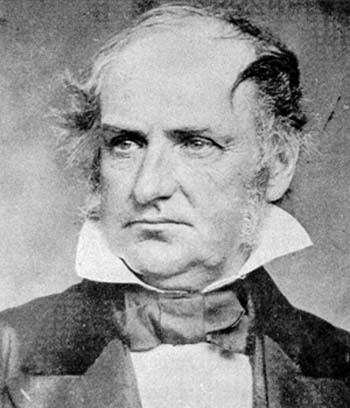

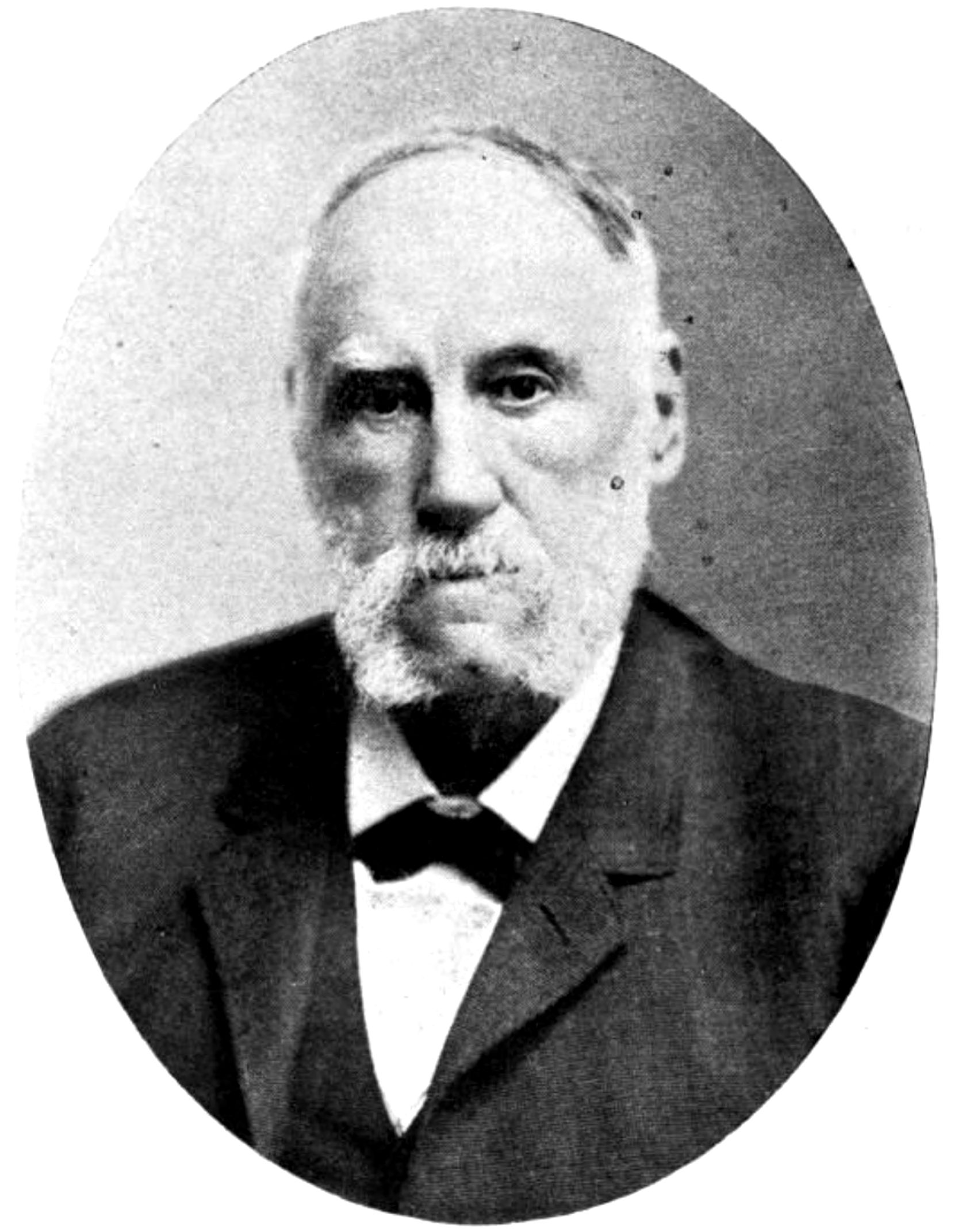

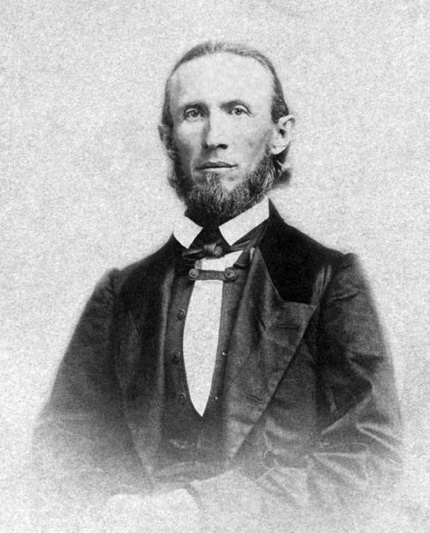

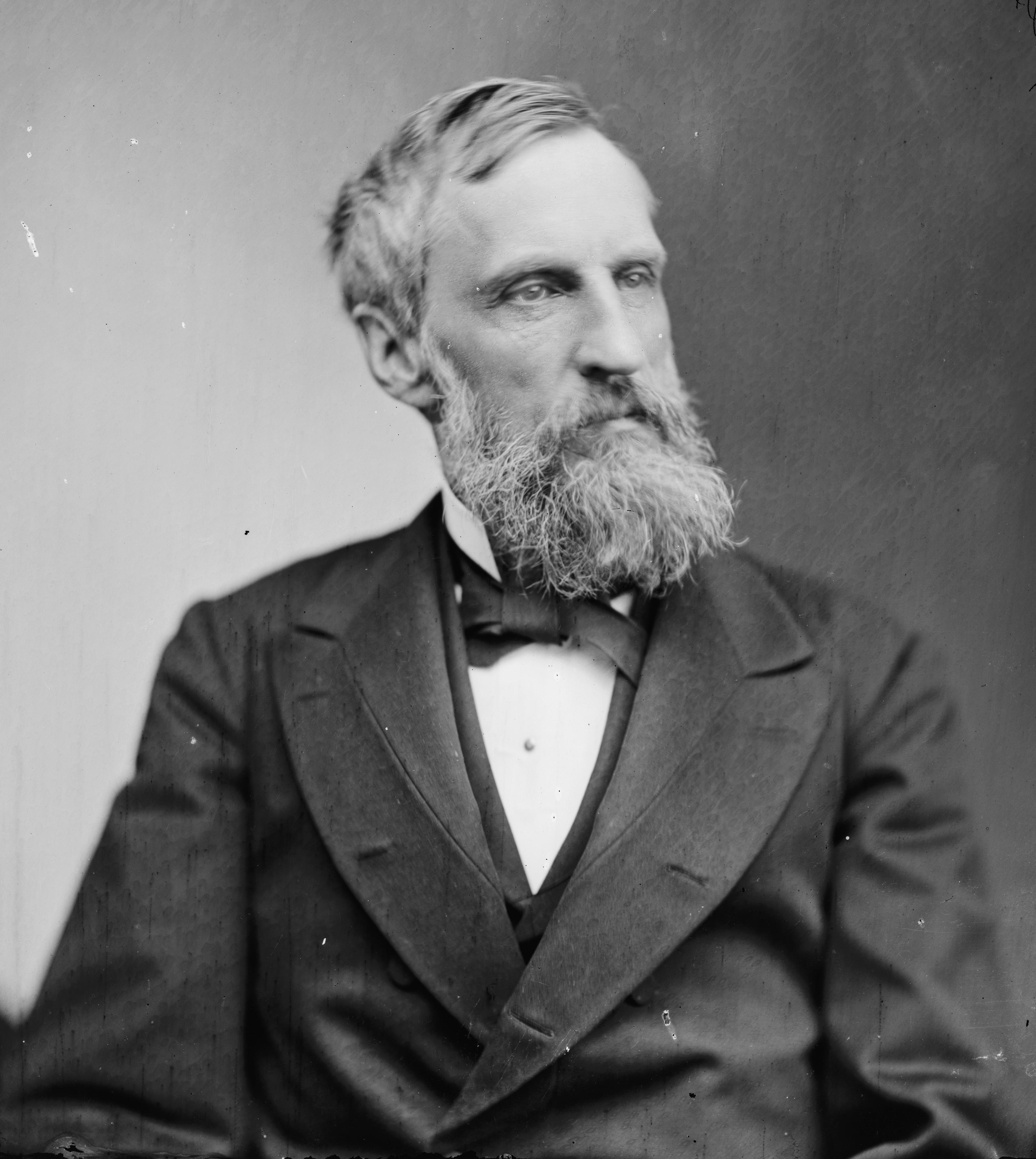

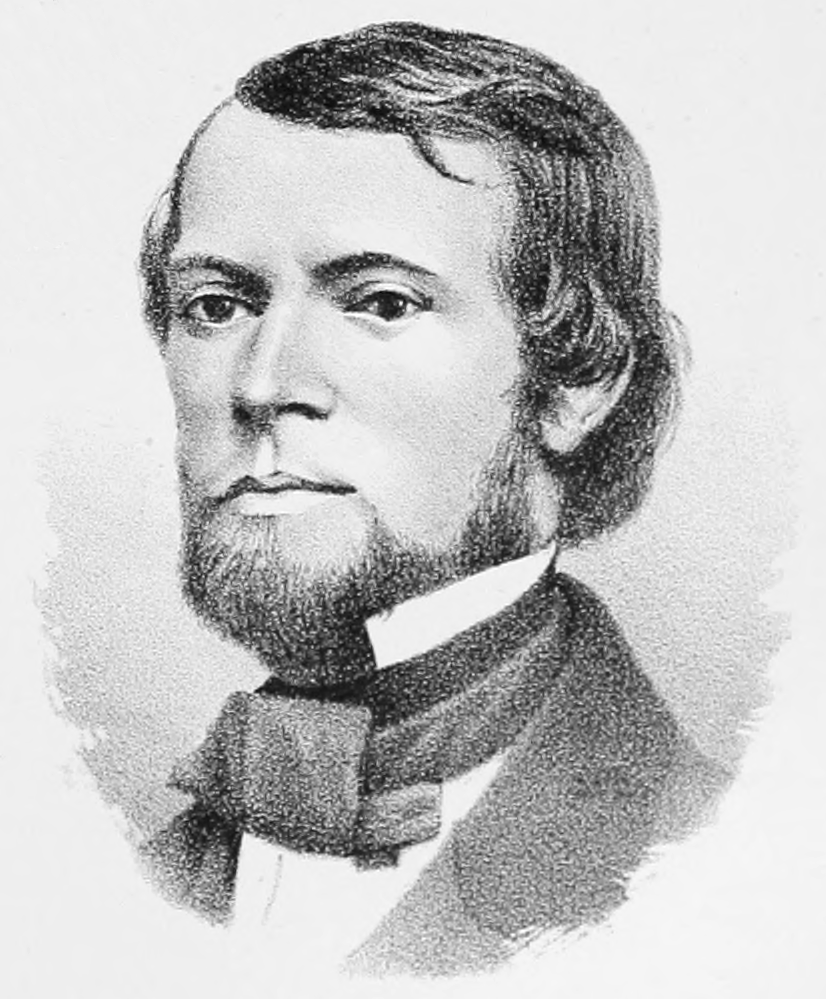
Nominee	Edward D. Baker	George H. Williams	George L. Curry
Party	Republican	Douglas Democratic	Breckinridge Democratic
1st ballot	—	11 (22.4%)	8 (16.3%)
14th ballot	26 (52.0%)	20 (40.0%)	2 (4.0%)
Nominee	La Fayette Grover	Amory Holbrook
Party	Douglas Democratic	Republican
1st ballot	16 (32.6%)	11 (22.4%)
14th ballot	—	—
Senator before election
None (vacant from March 4, 1859)
Elected Senator
Edward D. Baker
Republican

The 1860 United States Senate special election in Oregon was held on October 2, 1860, as part of the 1860–61 United States Senate elections. The Republican former U.S. representative from Illinois's 6th congressional district Edward D. Baker defeated the Douglas Democratic former chief justice of the Oregon Supreme Court George H. Williams on the 14th ballot.

Delazon Smith won the 1858 election for the term ending March 4, 1859, in anticipation the admission of Oregon to the Union. After the expiration of Smith's term, but before the 36th United States Congress convened, the governor of Oregon John Whiteaker called a special session of the Oregon Legislative Assembly in May 1859 to hold an election for the succeeding term. The Oregon Democratic Party was divided between partisans of U.S. senator Joseph Lane and Asahel Bush, who were identified with support or opposition to the Buchanan administration's policy on slavery in the U.S. territories, respectively. In the Democratic caucus, Smith, a Lane Democrat, was narrowly renominated with 22 out of 43 votes. The Bush Democrats subsequently refused to support Smith's re-election in the legislative joint session, and the legislature adjourned on July 4 without having elected a senator.

In the 1860 United States presidential election, Lane was nominated for vice president by supporters of John C. Breckinridge, the Southern Democratic candidate for president; the Lane faction became identified with Breckinridge's candidacy in Oregon, while the Anti-Lane forces supported Stephen A. Douglas. In state elections held in June 1860, an ad-hoc Anti-Lane coalition of Republicans and Douglas Democrats handed a decisive defeat to the Lane faction, which was reduced to a minority in the legislature. Besides their shared hatred of Lane, both groups opposed the United States Supreme Court's ruling in Dred Scott v. Sandford and supported popular sovereignty in the territories. The election of an Anti-Lane majority cleared the way for a cooperation between Republicans and Douglas Democrats in the upcoming senatorial elections.

The legislature met again in joint session on September 21, 1860, to hold concurrent elections for the vacant Class 2 seat and the Class 3 seat held by Lane. The elected legislature included 19 Lane Democrats, 18 Douglas Democrats, and 13 Republicans. In an attempt to prevent a quorum in the Senate, six Lane Democrats absented themselves from the proceedings; during their absence, the House of Representatives attempted to conduct the election, but no candidate for either seat gained a majority over twenty ballots.

At length, the absent senators were persuaded to return, and balloting resumed on October 1. Republican Amory Holbrook, Douglas Democrats George H. Williams and La Fayette Grover, and Breckinridge Democrat George L. Curry were the major candidates on the first ballot. A coalition between the Republicans and Douglas Democrats remained elusive until the following day. On October 2, the Republican members switched their votes from Holbrook to Baker, who had withdrawn his candidacy for the Class 3 seat. Fifteen Douglas Democrats joined the Republicans to elect Baker, in exchange for Republicans vote to elect the Douglas Democratic candidate for the Class 3 seat, James Nesmith. Holbrook, who thought fusion ill-advised and mistrusted Baker's Republican credentials, cast a blank ballot all through the voting on October 2.

== General election ==
=== Ballots 1–10 (October 1) ===
1860 United States Senate special election in Oregon
Party	Candidate	Legislative ballot									
Party	Candidate	1st	2nd	3rd	4th	5th	6th	7th	8th	9th	10th
Douglas Democratic	La Fayette Grover	16	9	15	14	21	—N/a		21	7	—N/a
Republican	Amory Holbrook	11	11	13	11	11	12	12	10	11	11
Douglas Democratic	George H. Williams	11	12	—N/a	13	7	7	24	4	10	21
Breckinridge Democratic	George L. Curry	8	12	9	5	5	21	6	8	3	7
Douglas Democratic	Joseph W. Drew	2	2	2	—N/a	4	2	4	5	2	—N/a
Breckinridge Democratic	Delazon Smith	1	—N/a								
Douglas Democratic	James Nesmith	—N/a								10	—N/a
Breckinridge Democratic	J. H. Reed	—N/a								5	4
Scattering		—N/a		4	4	2	2	2	—N/a		7
Total votes		49	49	43	47	50	46	48	48	48	50
Votes needed to win		25	25	22	24	26	24	25	25	25	26

=== Ballots 11–14 (October 2) ===
1860 United States Senate special election in Oregon
Party	Candidate	Legislative ballot			
Party	Candidate	11th	12th	13th	14th
Republican	Edward D. Baker	23	24	21	26
Douglas Democratic	George H. Williams	1	—N/a	2	20
Breckinridge Democratic	George L. Curry	23	24	25	2
Breckinridge Democratic	Lansing Stout	—N/a			1
Republican	Amory Holbrook	2	1	—N/a	
Blank		1	1	1	1
Total votes		50	50	50	50
Votes needed to win		26	26	26	26

== Bibliography ==
=== Primary sources ===
- Oregon (1860). Journal of the Proceedings of the Senate of the Legislative Assembly of Oregon [...]. Salem, OR.

=== Secondary sources ===
- Carey, Charles Henry (1922). History of Oregon. Chicago: Pioneer Historical Publishing Company.
- Johannsen, Robert W. (1955). Frontier Politics and the Sectional Conflict: The Pacific Northwest on the Eve of the Civil War. Seattle: University of Washington Press.
