= 1856 United States elections =

- ← 1854 1855 1856 1857 1858 → Presidential election year
- Election day: November 4
- Incumbent president: ▌Franklin Pierce (D)
- Next Congress: 35th

Presidential election
- Partisan control: Democratic hold
- Popular vote margin: Democratic +12.2%
- Electoral vote
- James Buchanan (D): 174
- John C. Frémont (R): 114
- Millard Fillmore (A): 8
- 1856 presidential election results. Red denotes states won by Frémont, blue denotes states won by Buchanan, and lilac denotes states won by Fillmore. Numbers indicate the electoral votes won by each candidate.

Senate elections
- Overall control: Democratic hold
- Seats contested: 21 of 62 seats
- Net seat change: Republican +7

House elections
- Overall control: Democratic gain
- Seats contested: All 237 voting members
- Net seat change: Democratic +51

Elections were held for the 35th United States Congress and the presidency of the United States, to serve from 1857 until 1861. The elections took place during a major national debate over slavery, with the issue of "Bleeding Kansas" taking center stage. Along with the 1854 elections, these elections occurred during the transitional period immediately preceding the Third Party System. Old party lines were broken; new party alignments along sectional lines were in the process of formation. The Republican Party absorbed the Northern anti-slavery representatives who had been elected in 1854 under the "Opposition Party" ticket (consisting largely of former Whigs) as the second-most powerful party in Congress. Minnesota and Oregon joined the union before the next election, and elected their respective congressional delegations to the 35th Congress.

In the presidential election, Democratic former Secretary of State James Buchanan defeated Republican General John Fremont and the American Party candidate, former President Millard Fillmore. Buchanan swept the South and split the North with Fremont, while Fillmore won Maryland. Buchanan had defeated incumbent President Franklin Pierce (the first elected president to lose his party's presidential nomination) and Senator Stephen A. Douglas of Illinois on the 17th ballot at the 1856 Democratic National Convention. Fremont defeated Supreme Court Justice John McLean at the 1856 Republican National Convention to take the Republican nomination. Fillmore's third-party candidacy took over twenty percent of the popular vote, the best popular vote showing by a third party until Theodore Roosevelt's 1912 candidacy.

In the House, the Democratic Party won several seats to take the plurality, but narrowly missed taking the majority. The Republican Party established itself as the second-largest party in the House, replacing the Opposition Party. The American Party lost numerous seats, but continued to maintain a presence in the House. Democrat James Lawrence Orr won election as Speaker of the House.

In the Senate, Democrats made minor gains, maintaining their commanding majority. The Republican Party replaced the Opposition Party as the second-largest party, while the American Party picked up a small number of seats.

== See also ==
- 1856 United States presidential election
- 1856–57 United States House of Representatives elections
- 1856–57 United States Senate elections
