= List of elections in 1857 =

The following elections occurred in the year 1857.

- 1857 Belgian general election
- 1857 Faroese general election
- 1857 French legislative election
- 1857 Liberian general election
- 1857 Luxembourg general election
- 1857 Mexican general election
- 1857 Swiss federal election

== North America ==
=== United States ===
- 1857 New York state election
- United States Senate election in New York, 1857

==== United States Senate ====
- 1856 and 1857 United States Senate elections
- 1857 United States Senate election in California
- 1857 United States Senate special election in California
- 1857 United States Senate election in Massachusetts
- 1857 United States Senate election in New York
- 1857 United States Senate election in Pennsylvania
- 1857 United States Senate election in Wisconsin

==== United States House of Representatives ====
- 1856 and 1857 United States House of Representatives elections

==== United States lieutenant gubernatorial ====
- 1857 California lieutenant gubernatorial election
- 1857 Connecticut lieutenant gubernatorial election
- 1857 Minnesota lieutenant gubernatorial election
- 1857 Texas lieutenant gubernatorial election
- 1857 Wisconsin lieutenant gubernatorial election

==== United States gubernatorial ====
- 1857 Alabama gubernatorial election
- 1857 California gubernatorial election
- 1857 Connecticut gubernatorial election
- 1857 Georgia gubernatorial election
- 1857 Iowa gubernatorial election
- 1857 Maine gubernatorial election
- 1857 Maryland gubernatorial election
- 1857 Massachusetts gubernatorial election
- 1857 Minnesota gubernatorial election
- 1857 Mississippi gubernatorial election
- 1857 Missouri gubernatorial special election
- 1857 New Hampshire gubernatorial election
- 1857 Ohio gubernatorial election
- 1857 Pennsylvania gubernatorial election
- 1857 Rhode Island gubernatorial election
- 1857 Texas gubernatorial election
- 1857 Vermont gubernatorial election

==== United States mayoral elections ====
- 1857 Boston mayoral election
- 1857 Chicago mayoral election
- 1857 Manchester, New Hampshire election
- 1857 New York City mayoral election

== Europe ==
=== United Kingdom ===
- List of MPs elected in the 1857 United Kingdom general election
- 1857 United Kingdom general election
- 1857 United Kingdom general election in Ireland

== See also ==
- Category:1857 elections
