= 1860 United States elections =

- ← 1858 1859 1860 1861 1862 → Presidential election year
- Election day: November 6
- Incumbent president: ▌James Buchanan (D)
- Next Congress: 37th

Presidential election
- Partisan control: Republican gain
- Popular vote margin: Republican +10.3%
- Electoral vote
- Abraham Lincoln (R): 180
- John C. Breckinridge (SD): 72
- John Bell (CU): 39
- Stephen A. Douglas (D): 12
- 1860 presidential election results. Red shows states won by Lincoln, green by Breckinridge, orange by Bell, and blue by Douglas. Numbers indicate the electoral votes won by each candidate.

Senate elections
- Overall control: Democratic hold
- Seats contested: 22 of 66 seats
- Net seat change: Republican +3

House elections
- Overall control: Republican hold
- Seats contested: All 183 voting members
- Net seat change: Unionist +31

Elections for the 37th United States Congress, were held in 1860 and 1861. The election marked the start of the Third Party System and precipitated the Civil War. The Republican Party won control of the presidency and both houses of Congress, making it the fifth party (following the Federalist Party, the Democratic-Republican Party, the Democratic Party, and the Whig Party) to accomplish such a feat. The election is widely considered to be a realigning election.

In the presidential election, Republican former Representative Abraham Lincoln of Illinois defeated Democratic Vice President John C. Breckinridge (who became the first incumbent vice president to lose a presidential election) and Democratic Senator Stephen A. Douglas of Illinois, as well as the Constitutional Union candidate, former Senator John Bell of Tennessee. Lincoln swept the Northern United States while Breckinridge carried much of the Southern United States, foreshadowing the political alignment of the country throughout the Third Party System. At the 1860 Republican National Convention, Lincoln won on the third ballot, defeating Senator William H. Seward of New York and several other candidates.

The Democratic Party split its votes after three chaotic conventions. Douglas was nominated at the second Democratic convention, while the Southern Democrats nominated Breckinridge as their candidate in a third convention. Bell ran on a platform of preserving the union regardless of the status of slavery.

Lincoln's victory made him the first Republican president. Lincoln took just under 40 percent of the popular vote, a lower share of the popular vote than any other winning presidential candidate aside from John Quincy Adams's 1824 campaign.

In the House, Republicans retained control of the chamber and won a majority for the first time after several states seceded. Democrats remained the largest minority, but several Congressmen also identified as unionists.

In the Senate, Republicans made moderate gains, but Democrats initially retained a majority. They lost that majority shortly after the election when several Southern senators resigned. The Democrats would have the second-most members in the Senate, although many senators identified as unionists rather than Democrats or Republicans.

This marks one of four occasions where a newly elected president entered office with a divided legislature, occurring again in 1876, 1884, and 1980. 1884 is the only other occasion where the president's party held the House, but not the Senate. A divided Congress also occurred after the 1984 and 2012 elections.

== See also ==
- 1860 United States presidential election
- 1860–61 United States House of Representatives elections
- 1860–61 United States Senate elections
- 1860 Illinois gubernatorial election
- 1860 Michigan gubernatorial election
- 1860 Missouri gubernatorial election
- 1860 Pennsylvania gubernatorial election
