= 1859 Wisconsin lieutenant gubernatorial election =

- November 8, 1859

Nominee	Butler Noble	Alexander S. Palmer
Party	Republican	Democratic
Popular vote	59,606	53,059
Percentage	52.87%	47.06%
Lieutenant Governor before election
Erasmus D. Campbell
Democratic
Elected Lieutenant Governor
Butler Noble
Republican

The 1859 Wisconsin lieutenant gubernatorial election was held on November 8, 1859, in order to elect the lieutenant governor of Wisconsin. Republican nominee and former member of the Wisconsin State Assembly Butler Noble defeated Democratic nominee Alexander S. Palmer. This election marked the first time Democrats lost control over this office since it was established in 1848.

== General election ==
On election day, November 8, 1859, Republican nominee Butler Noble won the election by a margin of 6,547 votes against his opponent Democratic nominee Alexander S. Palmer, thereby gaining Republican control over the office of lieutenant governor for the first time. Noble was sworn in as the 7th lieutenant governor of Wisconsin on January 2, 1860.

=== Results ===
Wisconsin lieutenant gubernatorial election, 1859
Party	Candidate	Votes	%
Republican	Butler Noble	59,606	52.87
Democratic	Alexander S. Palmer	53,059	47.06
	Scattering	72	0.07
Total votes		112,737	100.00
Republican gain from Democratic			
