= 1859 Georgia gubernatorial election =

- October 3, 1859
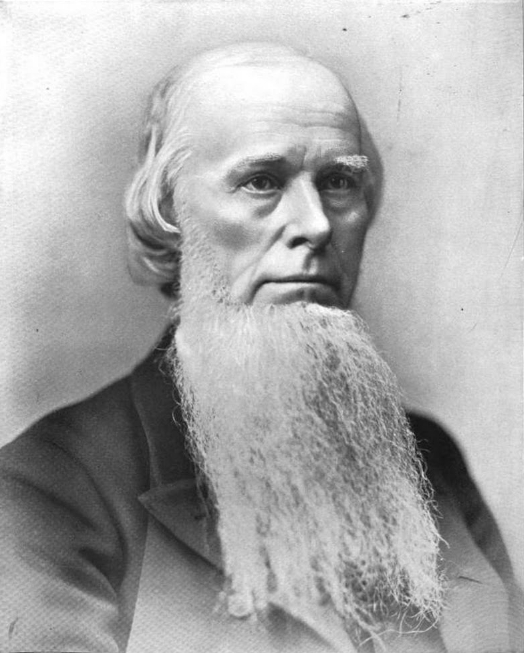

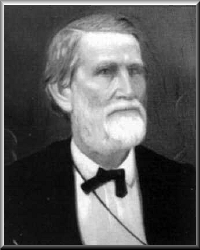
Nominee	Joseph E. Brown	Warren Akin Sr.
Party	Democratic	Opposition
Popular vote	63,784	41,830
Percentage	60.39%	39.61%
- Results by County; Brown: 50–60% 60–70% 70–80% 80–90% >90% Akin: 50–60% 60–70% 70–80%
Governor before election
Joseph E. Brown
Democratic
Elected Governor
Joseph E. Brown
Democratic

The 1859 Georgia gubernatorial election was held on October 3, 1859, in order to elect the Governor of Georgia. Democratic nominee and incumbent Governor Joseph E. Brown defeated Opposition Party nominee and former Cherokee Superior Court judge Warren Akin Sr.

By 1859, the Know-Nothings no longer appealed to Georgian voters with its old principles and no one was willing to carry its banner into another gubernatorial election. To do so, according to the Savannah Republican, would be nothing but to "stand alone, dreaming of the past." The battle must be "with the realities of the present."

The executive committee of the Georgia Know-Nothings formally announced the demise of the party in early June 1859, with an Opposition party quickly rising from its ashes. This new party issued a call for all Democrats who wished to assert their independence, old Whigs, and former Know-Nothings to assemble.

The party was unable to make a nomination at its convention in Macon on July 20 as there were no acceptable candidates. The convention then met again in Atlanta on August 10, with an estimated 1,000 attendees from a conglomeration of those who were politically unhappy. The Federal Union referred to the coming assembly as a "menagerie of oppossums, coons, and wild cats" plus "many other animals." Later the same editor labeled the Opposition as "odds and ends of all parties that have existed in Georgia for the past six years."

The pro-Opposition Macon Citizen offered a list of thirty-nine possible candidates it could support. The editor proposed balloting until all were eliminated but the strongest. Finding no man of prominence willing to make the race for governor, the Atlanta convention nominated Warren Akin of Cass County, a part-time attorney for the railroad until Brown fired him. In accepting the nomination, Akin, like Brown, explained that poor health would prevent him from carrying on an active canvass. Despite his ill health, Akin did campaign in the principal cities, but all he could do was denounce the Brown administration in general as they had nothing to really offer besides being anti-Banker. All Brown's friends needed to do was point to the achievements of his administration.

== General election ==
On election day, October 3, 1859, Democratic nominee Joseph E. Brown won the election by a large margin of 21,954 votes against Opposition Party nominee Warren Akin Sr., thereby continuing Democratic control over the office of Governor.

Brown carried Floyd, Cass, and Fulton counties, the home territory of the discontents, and even Baldwin County, in which the then capital Milledgeville was located, which was last carried by a Democrat in the 1841 gubernatorial election. Brown was sworn in for his second of four terms on November 4, 1859.

=== Results ===
Georgia gubernatorial election, 1859
Party	Candidate	Votes	%
Democratic	Joseph E. Brown	63,784	60.39
Opposition	Warren Akin Sr.	41,830	39.61
Total votes		105,614	100.00
