= 1859 Kansas gubernatorial election =

- December 6, 1859
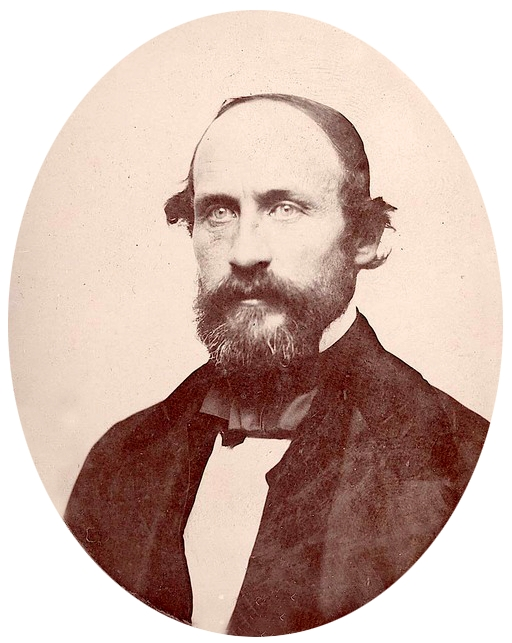

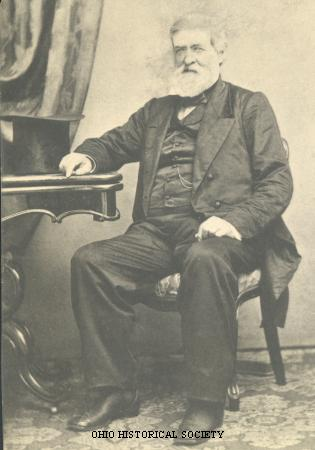
Nominee	Charles L. Robinson	Samuel Medary
Party	Republican	Democratic
Popular vote	7,848	5,401
Percentage	59.24%	40.76%
- County results Robinson: 50–60% 60–70% 70–80% 80–90% >90% Medary: 50–60% 60–70% 70–80% No Data
Governor before election
Samuel Medary (Territorial)
Democratic
Elected Governor
Charles L. Robinson
Republican

The 1859 Kansas gubernatorial election was held on December 6, 1859, in order to elect the first Governor of Kansas upon Kansas acquiring statehood on January 29, 1861. Republican nominee and former member of the California Assembly from the 12th district Charles L. Robinson defeated Democratic nominee and incumbent Territorial Governor of Kansas Samuel Medary.

== General election ==
On election day, December 6, 1859, Republican nominee Charles L. Robinson won the election by a margin of 2,447 votes against his opponent Democratic nominee Samuel Medary, thereby gaining Republican control over the new office of Governor. Robinson was sworn in as the 1st Governor of the new state of Kansas on February 1, 1861.

=== Results ===
Kansas gubernatorial election, 1859
Party	Candidate	Votes	%
Republican	Charles L. Robinson	7,848	59.24
Democratic	Samuel Medary (incumbent)	5,401	40.76
Total votes		13,249	100.00
Republican gain from Democratic			
