= 1857 Faroese general election =

Danish territorial election

Partial general elections were held in the Faroe Islands in 1857 to elect nine of the eighteen elected members of the Løgting. The Danish administrator (Amtmaður) and the local dean (Próstur) were also members, with the administrator serving as the speaker.

== Electoral system ==
Members of the Løgting were elected by first-past-the-post voting, with voters having as many votes as there were seats available in their constituency. Nine of the 18 seats were elected every two years. Voting was restricted to men aged 25 or over who met certain tax-paying criteria.

== Results ==
| Constituency | Elected members | Notes |
|---|---|---|
| Norðoyggjar | Dánjal Jákup Joensen | |
| Norðoyggjar | Hans David Matras | Re-elected |
| Sandoy | Mads Andrias Winther | |
| Sandoy | Jonas Dalsgaard | |
| Suðuroy | Niels Jacob Joensen | Re-elected |
| Suðuroy | Harald Andreas Christian Krogh | Re-elected |
| Suðurstreymoy | Joen Jacobsen | Re-elected |
| Suðurstreymoy | Andreas Christian Lützen | Re-elected |
| Suðurstreymoy | Hans Olaus Djurhuus | |
Source: Løgting

== Aftermath ==
Norðoyggjar representative Dánjal Jákup Joensen died on 15 November 1859 and was replaced by Niels Joensen. Harald Andreas Christian Krogh left the country in 1860 and was replaced by Johan Mortensen.
