= 1848 Wisconsin lieutenant gubernatorial election =

- May 8, 1848
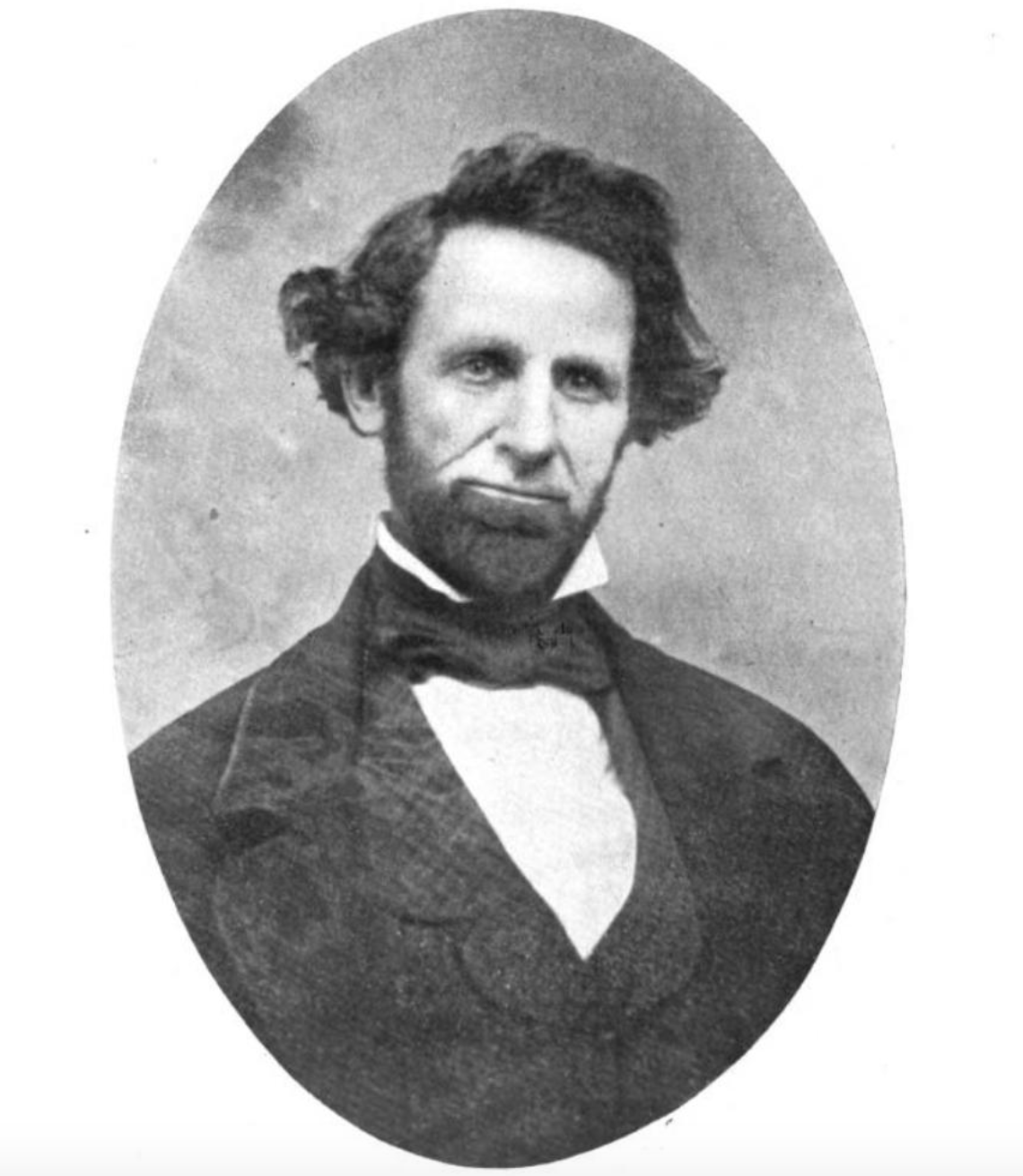

Nominee	John Edwin Holmes	John H. Rountree
Party	Democratic	Whig
Popular vote	19,537	14,355
Percentage	55.72%	40.94%
Lieutenant Governor before election
Office Established
Elected Lieutenant Governor
John Edwin Holmes
Democratic

The 1848 Wisconsin lieutenant gubernatorial election was held on May 8, 1848, in order to elect the first lieutenant governor of Wisconsin upon Wisconsin acquiring statehood on May 29, 1848. This election was held concurrent with a public referendum to ratify the Constitution of Wisconsin. Democratic nominee and former member of the Council of the Wisconsin Territory for Dodge and Jefferson counties John Edwin Holmes defeated Whig nominee and former member of the Council of the Wisconsin Territory from Grant County John H. Rountree and Independent candidates Jacob Ly Brand and Warren Chase.

== General election ==
On election day, May 8, 1848, Democratic nominee John Edwin Holmes won the election by a margin of 5,182 votes against his foremost opponent Whig nominee John H. Rountree, thereby attaining Democratic control over the office of lieutenant governor. Holmes was sworn in as the 1st lieutenant governor of Wisconsin on June 7, 1848.

=== Results ===
Wisconsin lieutenant gubernatorial election, 1848
Party	Candidate	Votes	%
Democratic	John Edwin Holmes	19,537	55.72
Whig	John H. Rountree	14,355	40.94
Independent	Jacob Ly Brand	986	2.81
Independent	Warren Chase	130	0.37
	Scattering	55	0.16
Total votes		35,063	100.00
Democratic hold			
