= 1857 Georgia gubernatorial election =

- October 5, 1857
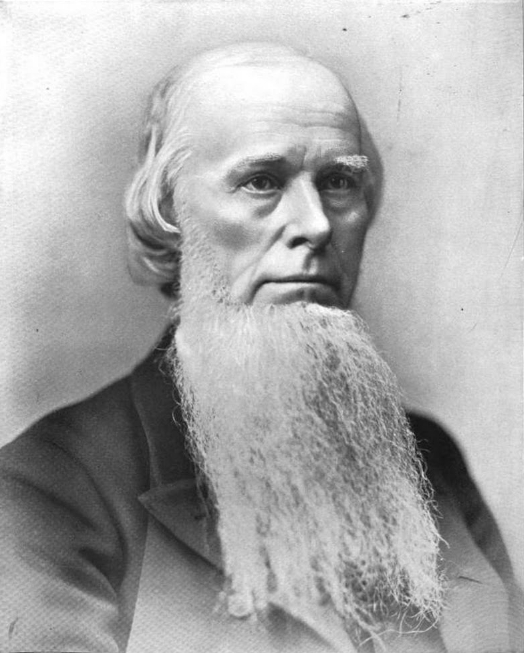

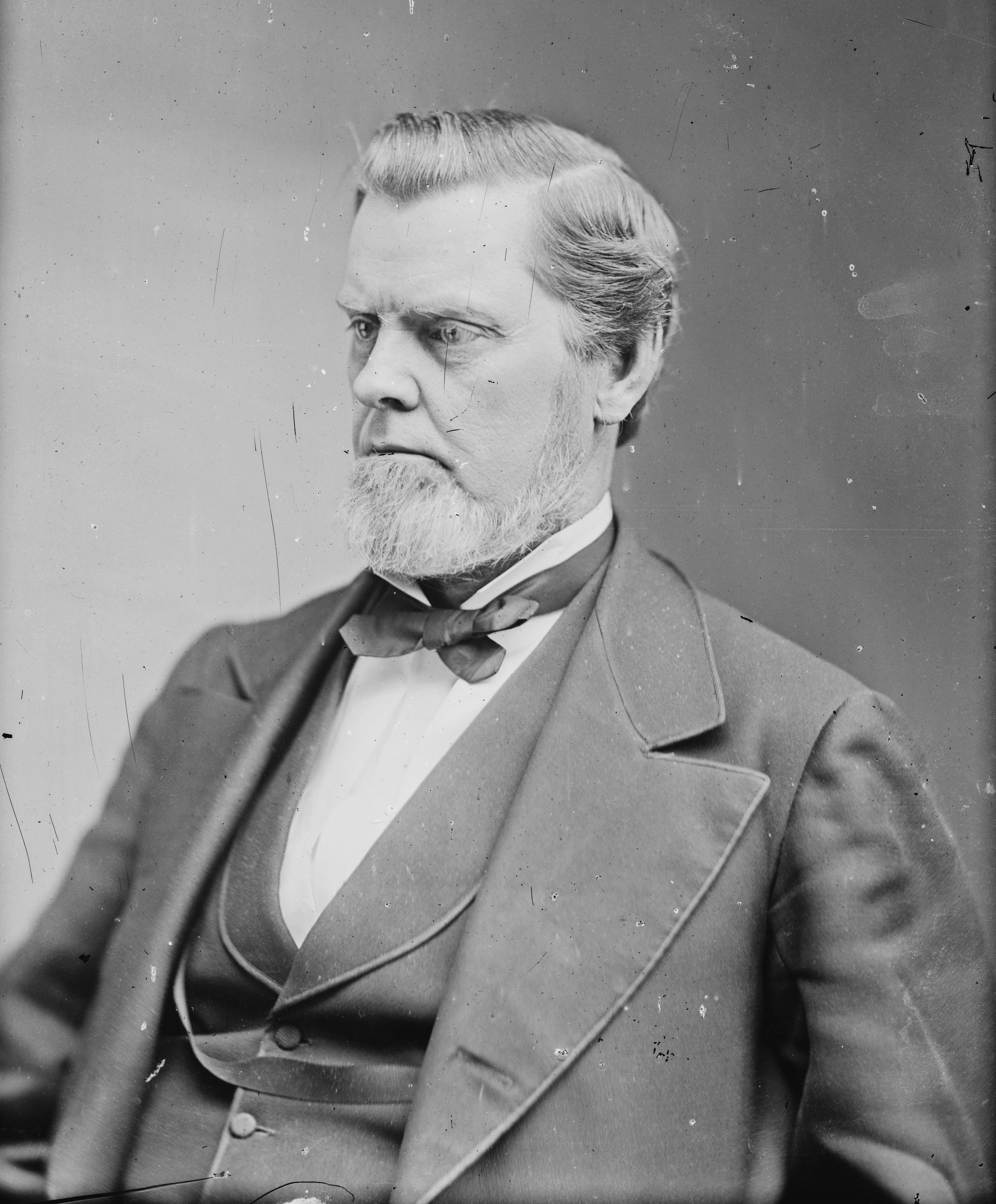
Nominee	Joseph E. Brown	Benjamin Harvey Hill
Party	Democratic	Know Nothing
Popular vote	57,631 (Note: Including returns from Clay and Webster County that were not included in the official count.)	46,796
Percentage	55.19%	44.81%
- Results by County; Brown: 50–60% 60–70% 70–80% 80–90% Hill: 50–60% 60–70% 70–80% 80–90%
Governor before election
Herschel V. Johnson
Democratic
Elected Governor
Joseph E. Brown
Democratic

The 1857 Georgia gubernatorial election was held on October 5, 1857, in order to elect the Governor of Georgia. Democratic nominee and state circuit court judge Joseph E. Brown defeated Know Nothing (Sam) nominee and State legislator Benjamin Harvey Hill.

Brown was a relatively unknown figure in Georgia politics before his governorship, with his victory over John H. Lumpkin, a close associate of former governor Howell Cobb, for the Democratic nomination shocking many people, with Robert Toombs reportedly asking "who the devil is Joe Brown" upon hearing his nomination.

Brown grew up poor and was not a planter, only owning 13 slaves. A self-made man, he went Yale University to study law and became a lawyer in Canton. Over half his assets came in stock and bonds (including railroad securities) and less than a fourth of his wealth resulted from his ownership of slaves. Additionally, the district that had elected him was in the mountain region of Georgia where very few owned slaves.

In Georgia the Know Nothing Party was called "Sam" by the local Democratic party. Its use was so widespread that even some Know-Nothings adopted it. According to Royce McCrary, the origins of the term are obscure. Sam was a term applied to the raw Irish immigrants in the 1850s. Apparently the Democrats, in a mocking way, meant to imply that the anti-Irish Know-Nothings were actually Irish.

Brown's victory over Hill in the general election, as commented by one writer, "was in its moral effect similar to the accession of Andrew Jackson to the Presidency in 1828 - a shock to the aristocratic regime in Georgia."

== General election ==
On election day, October 5, 1857, Democratic nominee Joseph E. Brown won the election by a margin of 10,835 votes against Know Nothing (Sam) (Note: In Georgia the Know Nothing Party was called "Sam" by the local Democratic party. Its use was so widespread that even some Know-Nothings adopted it. According to Royce McCrary, the origins of the term are obscure. Sam was a term applied to the raw Irish immigrants in the 1850s. Apparently the Democrats, in a mocking way, meant to imply that the anti-Irish Know-Nothings were actually Irish.) nominee Benjamin Harvey Hill, thereby continuing Democratic control over the office of Governor. Johnson was sworn in for his first of four terms on November 6, 1857.

=== Results ===
Georgia gubernatorial election, 1855
Party	Candidate	Votes	%
Democratic	Joseph E. Brown	57,631	55.19
Know Nothing	Benjamin Harvey Hill	46,889	44.81
Total votes		104,427	100.00
