= 1858–59 United States Senate elections =

- Various dates
- Class 2

22 of the 66 seats in the United States Senate (with special elections) 34 seats needed for a majority
	Majority party	Minority party
Party	Democratic	Republican
Last election	34 seats	15 seats
Seats before	42	20
Seats won	13	8
Seats after	38	25
Seat change	▼4	▲5
Seats up	17	3
	Third party	Fourth party
Party	American	Others
Last election	2 seats	4 seats
Seats before	4	0
Seats won	0	0
Seats after	2	0
Seat change	▼2	Steady
Seats up	2	0
- Results of the elections: Democratic gain Democratic hold Republican gain Republican hold Legislature failed to elect
Majority Party before election
Democratic
Elected Majority Party
Democratic

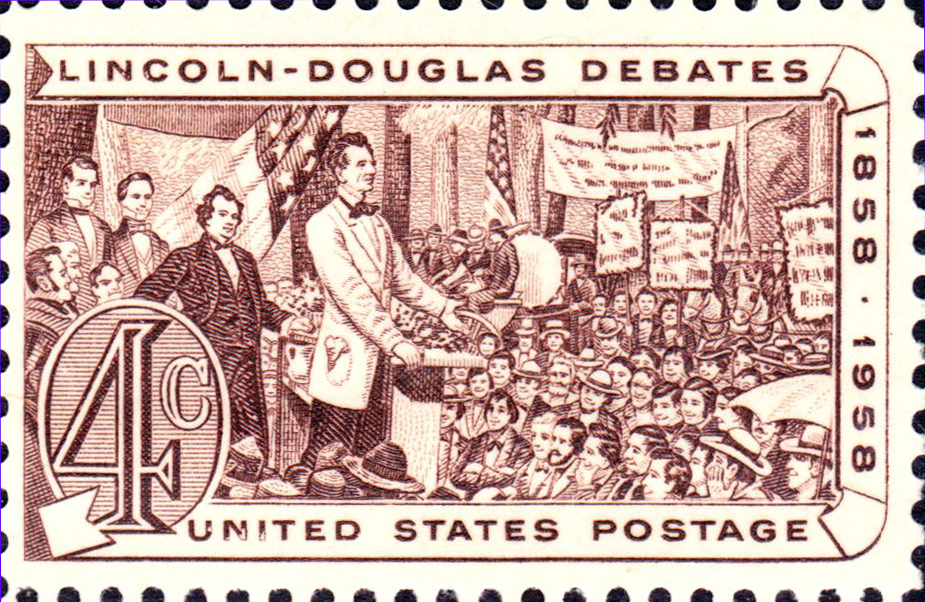
U.S. postage stamp, 1958 issue, commemorating the Lincoln and Douglas debates

The 1858–59 United States Senate elections were held on various dates in various states. As these U.S. Senate elections were prior to the ratification of the Seventeenth Amendment in 1913, senators were chosen by state legislatures. Senators were elected over a wide range of time throughout 1858 and 1859, and a seat may have been filled months late or remained vacant due to legislative deadlock. In these elections, terms were up for the senators in Class 2.

The Republican Party gained five additional seats in the Senate, but the Democratic Party retained its majority. That majority would erode in 1860 with the secession of the Southern United States, in the early stages of the Civil War.

In Illinois, incumbent Stephen A. Douglas (D) and challenger Abraham Lincoln (R) held a series of seven debates, known as the "Lincoln–Douglas debates."

== Results summary ==
Senate party division, 36th Congress (1859–1861)

- Majority party: Democratic (38–25)
- Minority party: Republican (25–26)
- Other parties: American (2)
- Total seats: 66–68

== Change in Senate composition ==
=== Before the elections ===
D_{3}	D_{2}	D_{1}							
D_{4}	D_{5}	D_{6}	D_{7}	D_{8}	D_{9}	D_{10}	D_{11}	D_{12}	D_{13}
D_{23}	D_{22}	D_{21}	D_{20}	D_{19}	D_{18}	D_{17}	D_{16}	D_{15}	D_{14}
D_{24}	D_{25}	D_{26} Ran	D_{27} Ran	D_{28} Ran	D_{29} Ran	D_{30} Ran	D_{31} Ran	D_{32} Ran	D_{33} Ran
Majority →									D_{34} Ran
A_{4} Unknown	D_{42} Retired	D_{41} Retired	D_{40} Retired	D_{39} Retired	D_{38} Retired	D_{37} Ran	D_{36} Ran	D_{35} Ran	D_{34} Ran
A_{3} Unknown	A_{2}	A_{1}	R_{20} Ran	R_{19} Ran	R_{18} Ran	R_{17}	R_{16}	R_{15}	R_{14}
R_{4}	R_{5}	R_{6}	R_{7}	R_{8}	R_{9}	R_{10}	R_{11}	R_{12}	R_{13}
R_{3}	R_{2}	R_{1}							

=== As a result of the elections ===
D_{3}	D_{2}	D_{1}							
D_{4}	D_{5}	D_{6}	D_{7}	D_{8}	D_{9}	D_{10}	D_{11}	D_{12}	D_{13}
D_{23}	D_{22}	D_{21}	D_{20}	D_{19}	D_{18}	D_{17}	D_{16}	D_{15}	D_{14}
D_{24}	D_{25}	D_{26} Re-elected	D_{27} Re-elected	D_{28} Re-elected	D_{29} Re-elected	D_{30} Re-elected	D_{31} Re-elected	D_{32} Re-elected	D_{33} Hold
Majority →									D_{34} Hold
R_{24} Gain	R_{25} Gain	A_{1}	A_{2}	V_{1} D Loss	D_{38} Gain	D_{37} Gain	D_{36} Hold	D_{35} Hold	D_{34} Hold
R_{23} Gain	R_{22} Gain	R_{21} Gain	R_{20} Re-elected	R_{19} Re-elected	R_{18} Re-elected	R_{17}	R_{16}	R_{15}	R_{14}
R_{4}	R_{5}	R_{6}	R_{7}	R_{8}	R_{9}	R_{10}	R_{11}	R_{12}	R_{13}
R_{3}	R_{2}	R_{1}							

Key:

D_{#}	Democratic
A_{#}	American
R_{#}	Republican
V_{#}	Vacant

== Race summaries ==
=== Special elections during the 35th Congress ===
In these elections, the winners were seated during 1858 or in 1859 before March 4; ordered by election date.

State	Incumbent			Results	Candidates
State	Senator	Party	Electoral history	Results	Candidates
Minnesota (Class 1)	None (new state)			Minnesota's first senators were elected May 11, 1858. Democratic gain.	▌ ✓ Henry M. Rice (Democratic) [data missing]
Minnesota (Class 2)	None (new state)			Minnesota's first senators were elected May 11, 1858. Democratic gain.	▌ ✓ James Shields (Democratic); [data missing]
Oregon (Class 2)	None (new state)			Oregon's first senators were elected in 1858 in advance of statehood. Democratic gain.	▌ ✓ Delazon Smith (Democratic); [data missing]
Oregon (Class 3)	None (new state)			Oregon's first senators were elected in 1858 in advance of statehood. Democratic gain.	▌ ✓ Joseph Lane (Democratic); [data missing]
North Carolina (Class 3)	Thomas Clingman	Democratic	1858 (appointed)	Interim appointee elected November 23, 1858 to finish the term.	▌ ✓ Thomas Clingman (Democratic); [data missing]
South Carolina (Class 2)	Arthur P. Hayne	Democratic	1858 (appointed)	Interim appointee retired when successor elected. New senator elected December 3, 1858. Democratic hold. Winner was also elected to the next term; see below.	▌ ✓ James Chesnut Jr. (Democratic); [data missing]

=== Races leading to the 36th Congress ===
In these regular elections, the winners were elected for the term beginning March 4, 1859; ordered by state.

All of the elections involved the Class 2 seats.

State	Incumbent			Results	Candidates
State	Senator	Party	Electoral history	Results	Candidates
Alabama	Clement Claiborne Clay	Democratic	1853 (special)	Incumbent re-elected in 1858.	▌ ✓ Clement Claiborne Clay (Democratic); [data missing]
Arkansas	William K. Sebastian	Democratic	1848 (appointed); 1848 (special); 1853	Incumbent re-elected in 1859.	▌ ✓ William K. Sebastian (Democratic); [data missing]
Delaware	Martin W. Bates	Democratic	1857 (special)	Incumbent lost re-election. New senator elected in 1858. Democratic hold.	▌ ✓ Willard Saulsbury Sr. (Democratic); [data missing]
Georgia	Robert Toombs	Democratic	1852	Incumbent re-elected in 1858.	▌ ✓ Robert Toombs (Democratic); [data missing]
Illinois	Stephen A. Douglas	Democratic	1846; 1852	Incumbent re-elected January 5, 1859.	▌ ✓ Stephen A. Douglas (Democratic) 54; ▌Abraham Lincoln (Republican) 46
Iowa	George Wallace Jones	Democratic	1848; 1852	Incumbent lost renomination. New senator elected January 26, 1858. Republican gain.	▌ ✓ James W. Grimes (Republican) 64; ▌Benjamin M. Samuels (Democratic) 41
Kentucky	John B. Thompson	American	1851	Incumbent retired or lost re-election. New senator elected January 5, 1858. Democratic gain.	▌ ✓ Lazarus W. Powell (Democratic) 80; ▌ Garrett Davis (American) 54; ▌ John Burton Thompson (American) 1
Louisiana	Judah P. Benjamin	Democratic	1852	Incumbent re-elected in 1859.	▌ ✓ Judah P. Benjamin (Democratic); [data missing]
Maine	William P. Fessenden	Republican	1854 (special)	Incumbent re-elected in 1859.	▌ ✓ William P. Fessenden (Republican); [data missing]
Massachusetts	Henry Wilson	Republican	1855 (special)	Incumbent re-elected in 1859.	▌ ✓ Henry Wilson (Republican); [data missing]
Michigan	Charles E. Stuart	Democratic	1853	Incumbent retired. New senator elected in 1858. Republican gain.	▌ ✓ Kinsley S. Bingham (Republican); [data missing]
Minnesota	James Shields	Democratic	1849 (Ill.); 1849 (Ill.; election voided); 1849 (Ill.; special); 1855 (Ill.; lost); 1858 (Minn.)	Incumbent lost re-election. New senator elected December 15, 1859. Republican gain.	▌ ✓ Morton S. Wilkinson (Republican) 79; ▌James Shields (Democratic) 33; ▌W. A. Gorman (Democratic) 1
Mississippi	Albert G. Brown	Democratic	1854 (special)	Incumbent re-elected in 1859.	▌ ✓ Albert G. Brown (Democratic); [data missing]
New Hampshire	John P. Hale	Republican	1846; 1853 (retired); 1855	Incumbent re-elected in 1859.	▌ ✓ John P. Hale (Republican); [data missing]
New Jersey	William Wright	Democratic	1852 or 1853	Incumbent lost re-election. New senator elected in 1859. Republican gain.	▌ ✓ John C. Ten Eyck (Republican) 42; ▌Peter D. Vroom (Democratic) 33; ▌William Wright (Democratic)) 3; Robert F. Stockton (unknown) 2
North Carolina	David Reid	Democratic	1854	Incumbent lost re-election. New senator elected in 1858 or 1859. Democratic hold.	▌ ✓ Thomas Bragg (Democratic); [data missing]
Oregon	Delazon Smith	Democratic	1859	Incumbent lost re-election. Legislature failed to elect. Democratic loss. Seat would remain vacant until 1860.	▌Delazon Smith (Democratic) [data missing]
Rhode Island	Philip Allen	Democratic	1853	Incumbent retired. New senator elected in 1858. Republican gain.	▌ ✓ Henry B. Anthony (Republican); [data missing]
South Carolina	Arthur P. Hayne	Democratic	1858 (appointed)	Interim appointee retired. New senator elected December 3, 1858. Democratic hold. Winner was also elected to finish the current term; see above.	▌ ✓ James Chesnut Jr. (Democratic); [data missing]
Tennessee	John Bell	American	1847; 1853	Incumbent retired or lost re-election. New senator elected in 1858. Democratic gain.	▌ ✓ Alfred O. P. Nicholson (Democratic); [data missing]
Texas	Sam Houston	Democratic	1846; 1847; 1853	Incumbent retired. New senator elected in 1859. Democratic hold.	▌ ✓ John Hemphill (Democratic); [data missing]
Virginia	Robert M. T. Hunter	Democratic	1846; 1852	Incumbent re-elected in 1858.	▌ ✓ Robert M. T. Hunter (Democratic); [data missing]

=== Elections during the 36th Congress ===
In this election, the winner was elected in 1859 on or after March 4; ordered by date.

State	Incumbent			Results	Candidates
State	Senator	Party	Electoral history	Results	Candidates
Texas (Class 1)	Matthias Ward	Democratic	1858 (appointed)	Interim appointee lost nomination to finish the term. New senator elected December 5, 1859. Democratic hold.	✓ Louis Wigfall (Democratic) [data missing]

=== Race leading to the 37th Congress ===
In this regular election, the winner was elected for the term beginning March 4, 1861.

This election involved a Class 3 seat.

State	Incumbent			Results	Candidates
State	Senator	Party	Electoral history	Results	Candidates
Kentucky (Class 3)	John J. Crittenden	American	1816; 1819 (resigned); 1835; 1841 (retired); 1842 (appointed); 1842 or 1843 (special); 1843; 1848 (resigned); 1854	Incumbent retired. Winner elected December 12, 1859, far in advance of the term. Winner wasn't seated until term began March 4, 1861. Democratic gain.	▌ ✓ John C. Breckinridge (Democratic) [data missing]

== Illinois ==
1859 United States Senate election in Illinois
- January 5, 1859
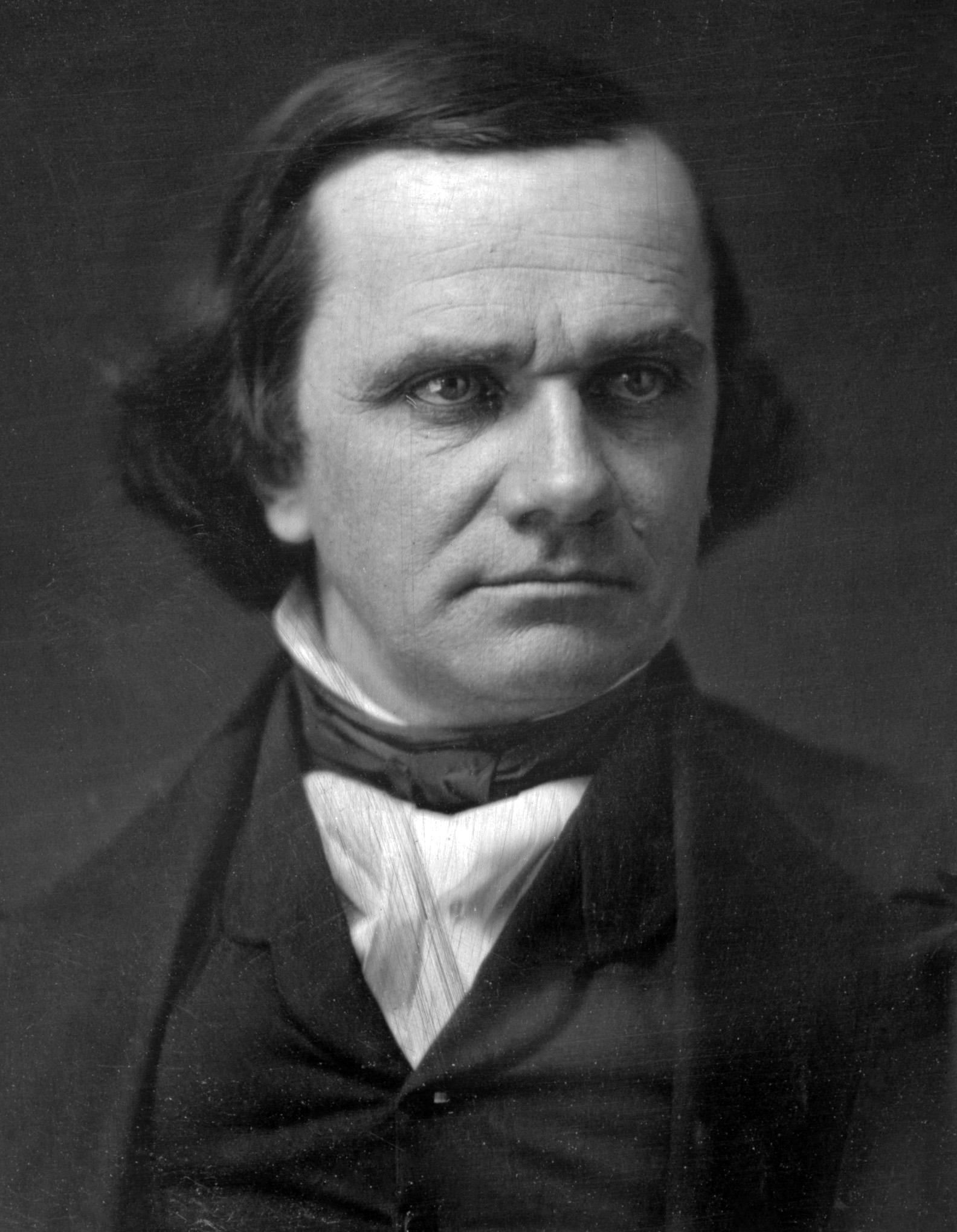

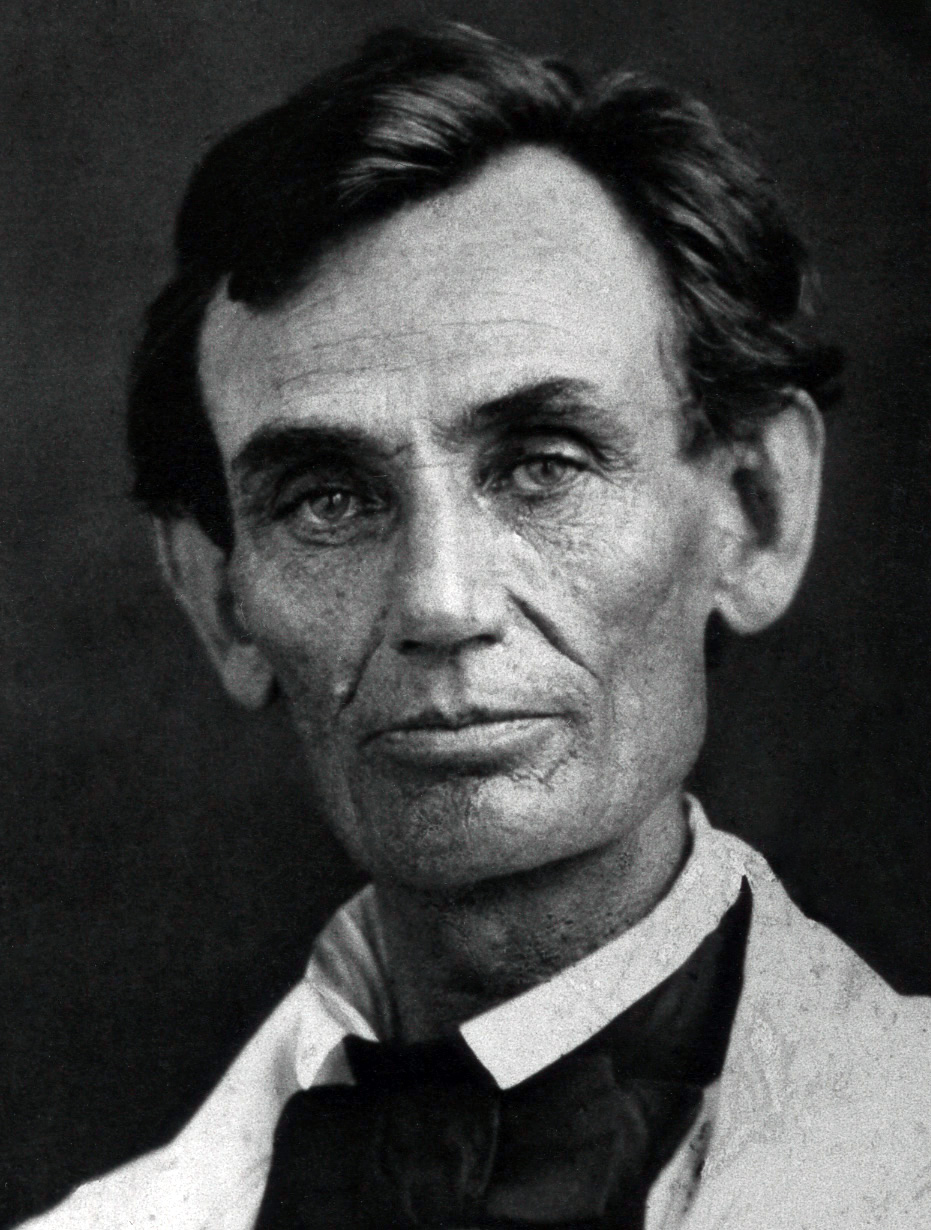
Nominee	Stephen Douglas	Abraham Lincoln
Party	Democratic	Republican
Electoral vote	54	46
Popular vote	166,374	190,468
Percentage	45.33%	51.90%
- State Senate results Douglas Lincoln

Incumbent U.S. Senator Stephen Douglas, a Democrat, defeated a challenge by former U.S. Representative Abraham Lincoln, the Republican nominee. Lincoln, who had been a member of the Whig Party prior to 1856, attacked Douglas for his perceived subservience to the Slave Power, as evidenced by his support for the Kansas-Nebraska Act and the recent Supreme Court ruling in the case of Dred Scott v. Sanford. The election was extremely close, hinging on Douglas' ability to appeal to former Whigs who had resisted joining the Republicans following the decline of the Whig party after 1854. In the final weeks of the campaign, Douglas received the coveted endorsement of Kentucky's John J. Crittenden, a prominent former Whig and Douglas' colleague in the Senate. Crittenden's support for Douglas considerably diminished Lincoln's chances of winning the election.

On election day, the statewide Republican ticket took 50.6% of the popular vote, outpolling the Democrats by a margin of 3,402 votes. Further down ballot, Republican candidates for the state legislature collectively received 24,094 more votes than the Douglas Democrats. (Buchanan Democrats received almost 10,000 votes, and there were a scattering of votes for write-in candidates.) Despite this, strategically drawn district boundaries produced Democratic majorities in both houses of the state legislature: 40 Democrats and 35 Republicans were elected to the state House of Representatives, while the Democratic margin in the Senate was 14–11. On the day of the election in the Illinois General Assembly, Douglas received 54 votes to Lincoln's 46. The change of just over 300 votes in three state legislative districts from Democrats to Republicans would have been sufficient to deny Democrats a legislative majority and defeat Douglas.

In spite of his defeat, Lincoln's debates with Douglas were followed nationally and established Lincoln as a leading contender for the Republican nomination in the 1860 United States presidential election. In the aftermath of the senatorial election, Lincoln contacted editors looking to publish the texts of the debates. George Parsons, the Ohio Republican committee chairman, got Lincoln in touch with Ohio's main political publisher, Follett and Foster, of Columbus. They published copies of the text under the title, Political Debates Between Hon. Abraham Lincoln and Hon. Stephen A. Douglas in the Celebrated Campaign of 1858, in Illinois. Four printings were made, and the fourth sold 16,000 copies.

== See also ==
- 1858 United States elections
  - 1858–59 United States House of Representatives elections
- 35th United States Congress
- 36th United States Congress
- Lincoln–Douglas debates
