= Amory Holbrook =

American attorney and politician (1820–1866)

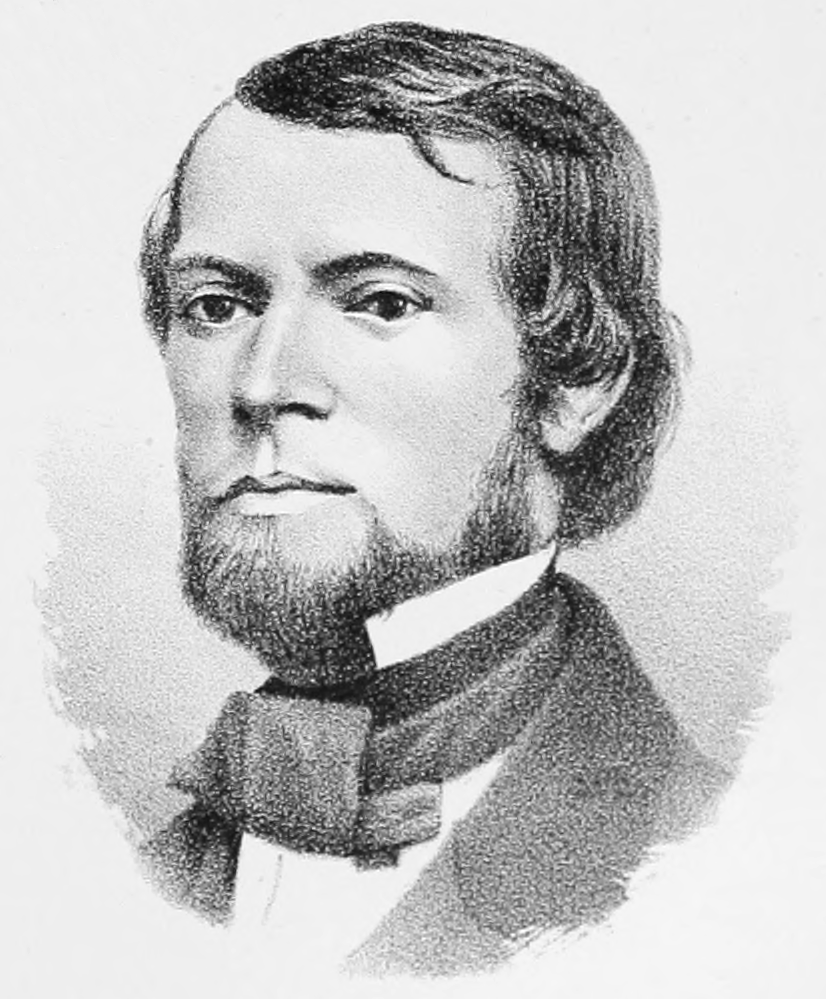

Mayor of Oregon City
- In office 1856–1859

Member of the Oregon House of Representatives
- In office 1860–1861
- Constituency: Clackamas County

Personal details
- Born: August 15, 1820
- Died: September 26, 1866 (aged 46) Oregon
- Party: Republican
- Spouse: Mary Hooper

Amory Holbrook (August 15, 1820 – September 26, 1866) was an American attorney and politician in the Oregon Territory. He was the first United States Attorney for the territory and later served as mayor of Oregon City and in the Oregon Legislative Assembly.

== Early years ==
Holbrook was born on August 15, 1820, on the United States East Coast. He attended Bowdoin College in Brunswick, Maine, where he graduated in 1841. Following graduation he studied law under Rufus Choate and began practicing law. He married Mary Hooper, and they had one son named Millard.

== Oregon ==
In August 1848, the United States created the Oregon Territory out of territory gained with the settlement of the Oregon Question in 1846. Holbrook was appointed as the first United States Attorney for the territory by President Zachary Taylor, and arrived in Oregon in May 1850 with his family. In June, he served as the prosecution in the trial of the Native Americans charged with carrying out the Whitman Massacre. The five members of the Cayuse were convicted and hung in Oregon City.

Holbrook was elected as mayor of Oregon City in 1856, serving until 1859. Oregon entered the Union in 1859 as the 33rd state. In 1860, he was a candidate for the United States Senate, but lost that year and a subsequent attempt for the position. That year he also served in the Oregon House of Representatives. Holbrook represented Clackamas County as a Republican.

He then started the Know Nothing Party in the state before serving as editor of The Oregonian from 1862 to 1864. Holbrook retired from politics after serving as editor and entered private legal practice. He died at the age of 46 on September 26, 1866.
