= Warren Akin Sr. =

American politician

Warren Akin Sr. (October 9, 1811 – December 17, 1877) was an attorney, member of the Georgia House of Representatives, Confederate politician who served in the Confederate States Congress during the American Civil War, and an ordained Methodist minister.

== Early years ==
Warren Akin Sr. was born in Elbert County, Georgia, and raised on a farm. At a very early age, he was inspired to become a lawyer, after viewing proceedings at an Elberton court. At age 18, with a limited amount of education, Akin sets off to seek his fortune in the Dahlonega Gold Rush. He would work in the gold fields for the next seven years, during which time he fulfilled his childhood ambition by reading law. Akins was admitted to the Cherokee Superior Court in 1836. He subsequently established a successful law practice in Cassville, Georgia while also operating a modest farm just outside the city. He became well known within the north Georgia region and was appointed colonel in the Georgia Militia, aiding in the removal of the Cherokees, a historical event which became known as the Trail of Tears. Akin later confesses sympathy for their plight.

== Political service ==
Expressing an interest in politics, but without the necessary support beyond his region in north Georgia, Akin ran unsuccessfully, receiving just 39.61% of the vote, for governor against incumbent Joseph Emerson Brown in 1859. Undeterred, he continued to stay active in the political events and controversies of the day. Akin was a slaveholder, but like many Southerners with Whig party backgrounds, he opposed secession. Nonetheless, after Georgia seceded from the Union, he felt honor bound to support his state, and the new national government of which it was part. He served in the Georgia state legislature from 1861 to 1863, where he was elected Speaker of the Georgia House. He is the only Representative ever elected to the position of Speaker in his first term. One act, for which he was largely responsible, was changing the name of his county from Cass to Bartow. During the first years of the war, Akin devoted his time to the practice of law in Cassville and his duties as a State Representative in Milledgeville. In 1862, long before it was an acceptable notion, Akin proposed allowing slaves to enlist in the Confederate Army with the promise of freedom in return for service. His proposal was met with overwhelming resistance. Akin wrote a letter to his wife, in which he lamented opposition to a proposal which he believed would win the war for the Confederacy: Have you ever noticed the strange conduct of our people during this war? How people of the Confederacy could oppose a measure that could help win the war seemed to have a hypocritical twist. Akin continued, They give up their sons, husbands, brothers & friends, and often without murmuring, to the army; but let one of their negroes be taken, and what a howl you will hear. The love of money had been the greatest difficulty in our way to independence - it is now our chief obstacle.... In November 1863, after the Confederate defeat in the Chattanooga campaign, Akin became convinced that his family would be in the path of approaching Union forces. In January 1864 he moved them initially to Oxford where Akin narrowly escaped capture by Union raiders. Akin's concerns were well founded, in May 1864 Union raiders burned Akin's home, law office, papers, and personal property left behind when the family moved to Oxford. In August 1864, Akin moved the family again, this time to Elberton, where they had relatives, and where many from the Cassville area had fled.

=== Confederate Congress ===
Akin represented Georgia in the Second Confederate Congress from 1864 to 1865, where he was regarded as an administration man because of his high regard for Jefferson Davis. The loss of his home, and personal property, along with the high cost of living in Elberton, and the Confederate capital of Richmond compelled Akin to extreme economies. His letters indicate that he wore clothes until they were so soiled that he was embarrassed to continue to wear them. It was also during this period that Akin occasionally expressed frustration with the protracted nature of the process and the long-winded speeches of his colleagues. On January 30, 1865 he wrote a letter to his wife in which he lamented I... feel we are doing nothing as we ought. Congress seems not to realize the magnitude of the duties devolved upon it. Akin left the Confederate Congress one month prior to adjournment, most likely because he anticipated that the Confederacy's collapse was imminent, and that further participation in the Congress was futile.

== Death and legacy ==
Considered by the Cartersville Bar “as the first man in his profession in North Georgia”, Akin died December 17, 1877. Continued by his descendants, Akin’s law practice in Cartersville is today one of the oldest law practices in the state.

== See also ==
- List of speakers of the Georgia House of Representatives

Party political offices
First	Opposition nominee for Governor of Georgia; 1859	Succeeded by None
