= 1859 Iowa gubernatorial election =

- October 11, 1859
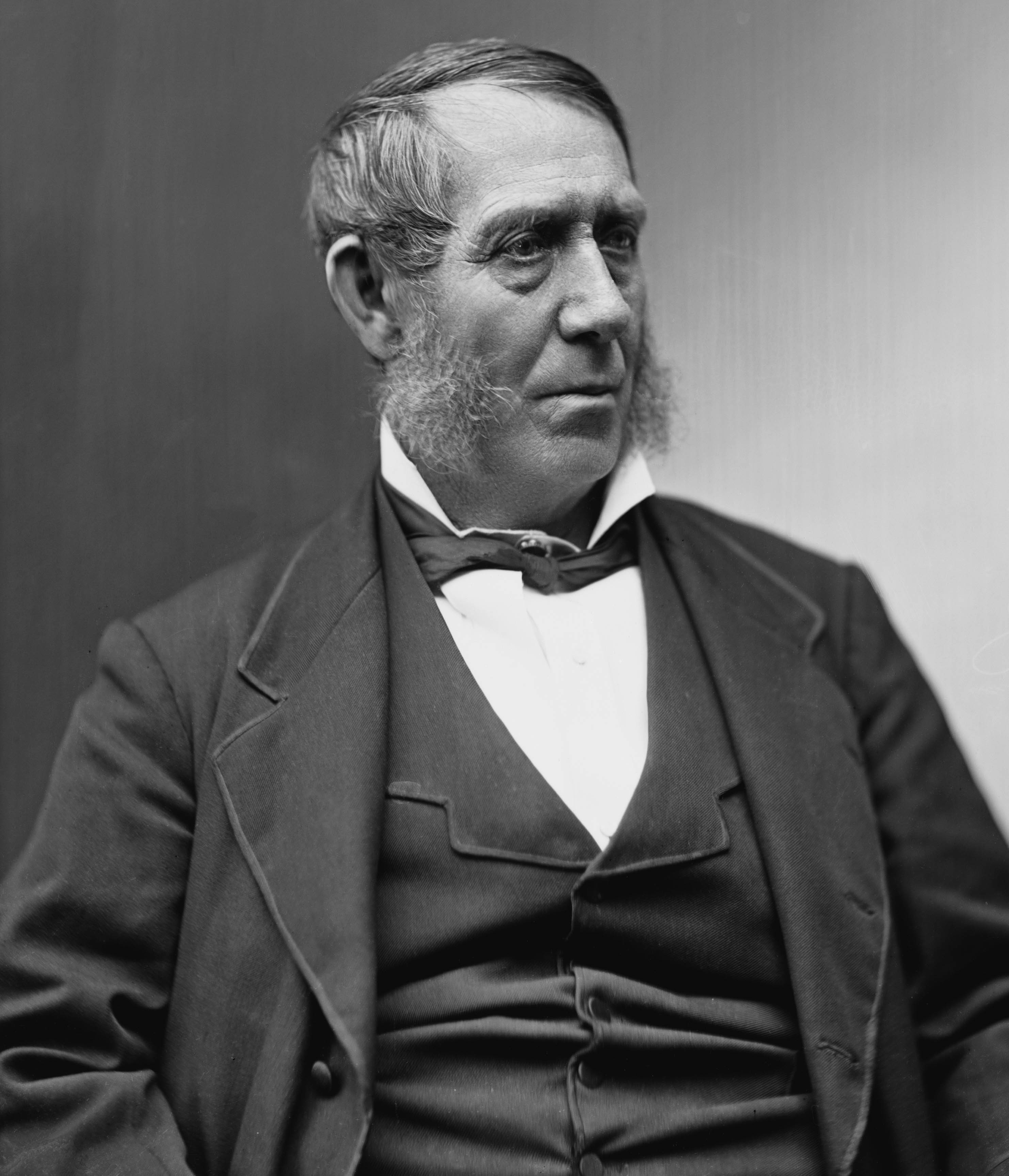

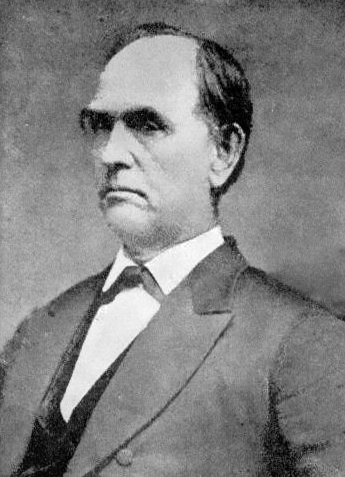
| Nominee | Samuel J. Kirkwood | Augustus C. Dodge |
| Party | Republican | Democratic |
| Popular vote | 56,532 | 53,332 |
| Percentage | 51.46% | 48.54% |
- County results Kirkwood: 50–60% 60–70% 70–80% 80–90% Dodge: 50–60% 60–70% 70–80% 90–100% No Data/Votes
Governor before election
Ralph P. Lowe
Republican
Elected Governor
Samuel J. Kirkwood
Republican

The 1859 Iowa gubernatorial election was held on October 11, 1859, in order to elect the Governor of Iowa. Republican nominee and incumbent Iowa Senate member Samuel J. Kirkwood defeated Democratic nominee and former United States Ambassador to Spain Augustus C. Dodge.

== General election ==
On election day, October 11, 1859, Republican nominee Samuel J. Kirkwood won the election by a margin of 3,200 votes against his opponent Democratic nominee Augustus C. Dodge, thereby holding Republican control over the office of Governor. Kirkwood was sworn in as the 5th Governor of Iowa on January 11, 1860.

=== Results ===
Iowa gubernatorial election, 1859
| Party | Candidate | Votes | % |
|---|---|---|---|
| Republican | Samuel J. Kirkwood | 56,532 | 51.46 |
| Democratic | Augustus C. Dodge | 53,332 | 48.54 |
| Total votes | | 109,864 | 100.00 |
| Republican hold | | | |
