= 1857 Iowa gubernatorial election =

- October 13, 1857
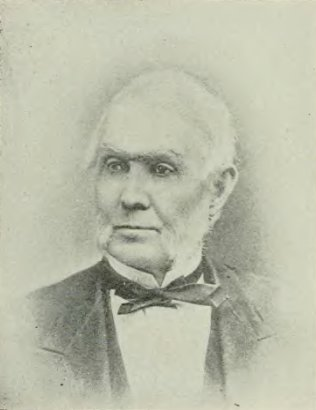

Nominee	Ralph P. Lowe	Ben M. Samuels
Party	Republican	Democratic
Popular vote	38,498	36,088
Percentage	50.93%	47.74%
- County results Lowe: 40–50% 50–60% 60–70% 70–80% 80–90% 90–100% Samuels: 50–60% 60–70% 70–80% 80–90% No Data/Votes
Governor before election
James W. Grimes
Whig
Elected Governor
Ralph P. Lowe
Republican

The 1857 Iowa gubernatorial election was held on October 13, 1857, in order to elect the Governor of Iowa. Republican nominee Ralph P. Lowe defeated Democratic nominee Ben M. Samuels and American Party nominee W. T. Henry. Marking the first time the recently formed Republican Party won the Iowa Governorship. It was also the first gubernatorial election held under the 1857 Iowa constitution.

== General election ==
On election day, October 13, 1857, Republican nominee Ralph P. Lowe won the election by a margin of 2,410 votes against his foremost opponent Democratic nominee Ben M. Samuels, thereby gaining Republican control over the office of Governor. Lowe was sworn in as the 4th Governor of Iowa on January 14, 1858.

=== Results ===
Iowa gubernatorial election, 1857
Party	Candidate	Votes	%
Republican	Ralph P. Lowe	38,498	50.93
Democratic	Ben M. Samuels	36,088	47.74
Know Nothing	W. T. Henry	1,004	1.33
Total votes		75,590	100.00
Republican gain from Democratic			
