= 1859 Connecticut lieutenant gubernatorial election =

- April 6, 1859
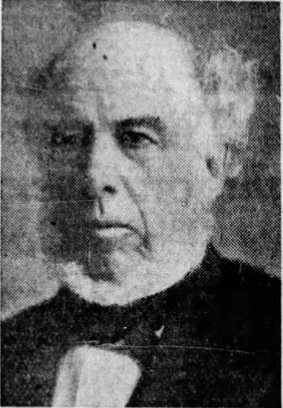

Nominee	Julius Catlin	Richard H. Winslow
Party	Republican	Democratic
Popular vote	40,222	38,307
Percentage	51.00%	48.60%
Lieutenant Governor before election
Julius Catlin
Republican
Elected Lieutenant Governor
Julius Catlin
Republican

The 1859 Connecticut lieutenant gubernatorial election was held on April 6, 1859, to elect the lieutenant governor of Connecticut. Incumbent Republican lieutenant governor Julius Catlin won re-election against Democratic nominee Richard H. Winslow.

== General election ==
On election day, April 6, 1859, incumbent Republican lieutenant governor Julius Catlin won re-election with 51.00% of the vote, thereby retaining Republican control over the office of lieutenant governor. Catlin was sworn in for his second term on May 4, 1859.

=== Results ===
Connecticut lieutenant gubernatorial election, 1859
Party	Candidate	Votes	%
Republican	Julius Catlin (incumbent)	40,222	51.00
Democratic	Richard H. Winslow	38,307	48.60
	Scattering	525	1.40
Total votes		78,880	100.00
Republican hold			
