= 1859 Texas lieutenant gubernatorial election =

- August 1, 1859
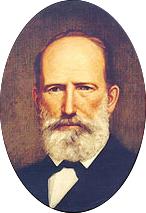

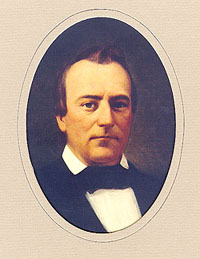
Nominee	Edward Clark	Francis Lubbock
Party	Independent	Democratic
Popular vote	31,458	30,325
Percentage	50.9%	49.1%
Lieutenant Governor before election
Francis Lubbock
Democratic
Elected Lieutenant Governor
Edward Clark
Independent

The 1859 Texas lieutenant gubernatorial election was held on August 1, 1859, to elect the lieutenant governor of Texas. Independent candidate Edward Clark defeated the Democratic incumbent Francis R. Lubbock to become the seventh lieutenant governor of the state.

== Background ==
Since the 1848 election, the Democratic Party had become the dominant political apparatus in the state. The party continued with the nominating convention process that had been developed in the previous election and at the 1859 convention the incumbents for statewide office were renominated, including Francis Lubbock for lieutenant governor.

The state Democratic party increasing embrased the rhetoric of sectionalist fire eaters who threatened secession should the federal government interfere with the institution of slavery. This radical rhetoric was concerning to southern unionists in the state and Sam Houston announced that he would attempt another independent campaign for governor. Houston's allies put forward Edward Clark, a Democratic state official, to join the Houston campaign as his lieutenant governor.

== Campaign ==
The gubernatorial race dominated the headlines and as such the lieutenant gubernatorial race was more closely contested from lower turnout and ticket splitting. In addition to the personal nature of the gubernatorial candidates, protection from Indian raids and the question of reopening the trans-Atlantic slave trade were two of the most pressing issues of the campaign. The Houston ticket also attracted former Know Nothings to his campaign.

== General election ==
On election day, Clark narrowly defeated Lubbock with just under 51% of the vote. The legislature certified the election on November 11, 1859 and Lubbock was sworn into office on December 21, 1859.

=== Candidates ===
- Edward Clark, lawyer, state commissioner of claims, former Texas Secretary of State, veteran of the Mexican-American War, former state senator and representative, delegate at the Constitutional Convention of 1845 (Independent)
- Francis Lubbock, rancher, incumbent lieutenant governor (Democrat)

=== Results ===
Texas lieutenant gubernatorial election, 1859
Party	Candidate	Votes	%
Independent	Edward Clark	31,458	50.90
Democratic	Francis Lubbock (incumbent)	30,325	49.06
Write-in		24	0.00
Total votes		61,807	100.00
Independent gain from Democratic			

== Aftermath ==
Despite Houston's position as a staunch unionist, following the election of Abraham Lincoln, the Texas became involved in the Secession crisis as fire eaters remained in control of the legislature. There was a campaign for Texas to call a convention to vote on the issue, but only the Governor can call a special session of the legislature. Governor Sam Houston was a unionist and refused. A secession convention was organized without government approval and Houston called for a special legislative session in January 1861 in the hopes that the legislature would declare the rogue convention illegal. This plan backfired and a convention was legalized which approved a Ordinance of Secession. When secession was approved by referendum, Houston refused to swear an oath of loyalty to the newly formed Confederate States of America. The legislature in turn removed Houston from office and Clark was sworn in as governor.
