= 1862–63 United States Senate elections =

- January 4, 1862– November 13, 1863
- Class 1

28 (Note: 24 Class 1 seats, including concurrent regular and special elections in Indiana, Missouri, New Jersey, and Rhode Island; and 4 special elections.) of the 70 (Note: Twenty seats were vacant as a result of secession.) seats in the United States Senate 36 (Note: As 20 seats representing the Confederacy remained vacant during the 38th Congress, the actual number of senators needed for a majority was 26.) seats needed for a majority
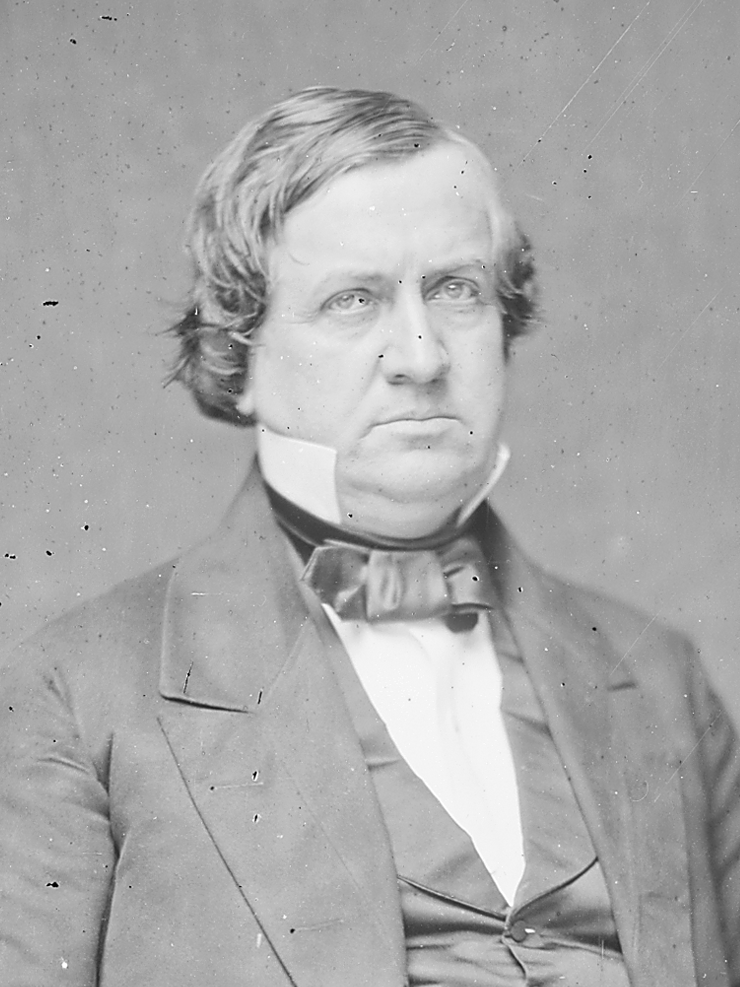
	Majority party	Minority party
		Dem
Leader	John P. Hale (Note: As chairman of the Senate Republican Conference) (retired as leader)	No formal leadership
Party	Republican	Democratic
Alliance	Republican–Union	—
Leader's seat	New Hampshire	N/A
Seats before	31	14
Seats won	35 (Note: William Sprague IV of Rhode Island was elected as a Constitutional Unionist with Democratic support, but joined the Republican–Union coalition at the beginning of the 38th Congress, increasing their caucus to 36 seats.)	10 (Note: Democrats lost 1 seat as a result of the death of James Pearce of Maryland, reducing their caucus to 9 seats.)
Seat change	▲4	▼4
Seats up	12	9
Races won	14	5
	Third party	Fourth party
Party	Union	Constitutional Union
Seats before	4	0
Seats won	4 (Note: Unionists gained 1 seat as a result of the appointment of Thomas H. Hicks of Maryland, increasing their caucus to 5 seats.)	1
Seat change	Steady	▲1
Seats up	2	0
Races won	2	1
- Results; Democratic hold Democratic gain Republican hold Republican gain Union hold Union gain Non-aligned Union hold Radical gain CU gain

The 1862–63 United States Senate elections were held from January 4, 1862, to November 13, 1863. Regularly scheduled elections were held for 20 out of the 70 seats in the United States Senate, and Indiana, Illinois, Michigan, Missouri, New Jersey, Oregon, and Rhode Island held special elections. Four states failed to hold elections due to the American Civil War. The Republican–Union coalition retained control of the Senate despite an unfavorable national environment.

U.S. senators are divided into three classes with staggered six-year terms, such that one-third of the Senate is elected every two years. Senators in Class 1 were elected in 1862 and 1863. Prior to the ratification of the Seventeenth Amendment in 1913, senators were elected by the U.S. state legislatures. There was no fixed calendar, and states held elections on various dates preceding the first session of Congress. In states with split partisan control of the legislature, multiple rounds of voting could be required to elect a senator, leading to extended vacancies.

Although the Democratic Party performed well in state and U.S. House races held in 1862, Democrats failed to make gains in the Senate and instead suffered a net loss of seats. Republican–Unionists flipped Democratic-held seats in California, Oregon, and Minnesota, while Democrats flipped Republican-held seats in Illinois and Pennsylvania. In Indiana and New Jersey, Democrats defeated Republican–Union incumbents appointed to fill vacancies caused by the expulsion or death of Democratic senators. Radical Unionists gained both Missouri seats held by Democrats prior to 1862, and Constitutional Unionists flipped a Republican-held seat in Rhode Island. Tennessee failed to hold a special election following the resignation of Democrat Andrew Johnson, increasing the number of vacancies to 20.

The death of James A. Pearce of Maryland reduced the Democratic caucus to nine seats before the beginning of the 38th Congress. Constitutional Unionist William Sprague IV of Rhode Island subsequently caucused with the Republican–Union majority, increasing their caucus to 36 seats.

== Background ==
The elections took place against the backdrop of the Civil War and the end of slavery in the United States in what was the first real test of opposition to the presidency of Abraham Lincoln. The war disrupted established party systems in the loyal states, resulting in a partial political realignment. In the lower North, Republicans and War Democrats contested these elections as the Union Party, while Republicans maintained separate organizations in New England and the upper Midwest. In Massachusetts and Rhode Island, anti-abolitionists formed new political parties composed of most Democrats and Constitutional Unionists. In the border states, Unionists were ascendant but internally divided over issues relating to slavery and Reconstruction.

Emancipation and the status of freedpeople were major issues during the campaign. Lincoln's initial plan of gradual, compensated emancipation paired with the colonization of freedpeople outside the United States was rejected by abolitionists who favored immediate, unqualified emancipation, as well as by Democrats and conservatives who opposed emancipation altogether. Radical Republican opposition to any compromise with slavery was the catalyst for the People's Party in Massachusetts, which campaigned in support of Lincoln's proposal. The manner and timing of emancipation split the Missouri unionist movement, leading Immediate Emancipationists to organize the Radical Union Party in September 1863. The preliminary Emancipation Proclamation undercut the momentum of pro-Lincoln conservatives, contributing to the Republican victory in Massachusetts.

Democrats attempted to capitalize on racist backlash to the proclamation, warning that emancipation would lead to slave rebellions and large-scale Black migration, and charged Republicans with prolonging the war in service of religious fanaticism. While radical Republicans celebrated the proclamation, moderates and conservatives feared the president's policy spelled electoral defeat. In Ohio, Republican–Unionists avoided mentioning slavery in their state platform, and the Indiana Union Party called for the restoration of the Union with the rights of the states fully intact.

== Results summary ==
Parties						Total
Parties	Democratic	Republican–Union	Union (Note: Including Unionists and Emancipationists who caucused separately from the Republican–Union majority.)	Others	Vacant	Total
Last elections (1860–61)	31	31	—	1	5	68
Before these elections	9	33	6	—	20	68
Not up	5	19	2	—	16	42
Class 2 (1858–59→1864–65)	2	8	1	—	9	20
Class 3 (1860–61→1866–67)	3	11	1	—	7	22
Up	4	14	4 (Note: Including the Missouri Class 1 seat. Missouri held two elections for this seat in 1863 due to the expulsion of Democrat Trusten Polk. Emancipationist John B. Henderson won the special election to complete Polk's term and was re-elected to the next term as a Republican–Unionist.)	—	6	28
Class 1 (1856–57→1862–63)	3	12 (Note: Including the Rhode Island Class 1 seat. Rhode Island held two elections for this seat in 1862 due to the resignation of Republican James F. Simmons. Constitutional Unionist William Sprague IV won the regular election and succeeded Constitutional Unionist Samuel G. Arnold, who won the special election to complete Simmons's unexpired term.)	3	—	4	24
Special: Class 2 & 3	1	2	1	—	—	3
Special: Class 1	—	3	1	—	—	5
New states	—	—	—	—	2 (Note: West Virginia)	2
General election
1862	—	3	1	—	—	4
Held by same party	—	2	1	—	—	3
Replaced by other party	▼1 Republican replaced by ▲1 Constitutional Unionist					1
Result	—	2	1	1	—	4
1863	3	9	2	—	6	20
Held by same party	1	6	1	—	4	12
Replaced by other party	▼3 Republican–Unionists replaced by ▲3 Democrats ▼2 Democrats replaced by ▲2 Republican–Unionists ▼2 vacancies replaced by ▲2 Republican–Unionists ▼1 Unionist replaced by ▲1 Republican–Unionist					8
Result	4	11	1	—	4	20
Special election
1862	1	2	—	—	—	3
Held by same party	—	1	—	—	—	1
Replaced by other party	▼1 Democrat replaced by ▲1 Republican–Unionist ▼1 Republican–Unionist replaced by ▲1 Constitutional Unionist					2
Result	—	2	—	1	—	3
1863	—	3	2	—	—	5
Held by same party	—	—	1	—	—	1
Replaced by other party	▼3 Republican–Unionists replaced by ▲3 Democrats ▼1 Unionist replaced by ▲1 Republican–Unionist					4
Result	3	1	—	1	—	8
Result	10	35	4	1	20	70
Other changes	▼1	Steady	▲1	Steady	Steady	70
Changes after December 7, 1863	Steady	▲1	Steady	▼1	Steady	70

== Maps ==
Elections held in 1862

Elections held in 1863

== Change in composition ==
Each block represents one of the 68 seats in the U.S. Senate. (The admission of West Virginia on June 20, 1863, increased the number of seats in the Senate to 70.) "CU_{#}" is a Constitutional Union senator, "D_{#}" is a Democratic senator, "R_{#}" is a Republican senator, "RU_{#}" is a Republican–Union senator, "U_{#}" is a Union senator, and "V_{#}" is a vacant seat. They are arranged so that the parties are separated, and a majority is clear by crossing the middle.

=== Before the elections ===
V_{4}	V_{3}	V_{2}	V_{1}						
V_{5}	V_{6}	V_{7}	V_{8}	V_{9}	V_{10}	D_{1}	D_{2}	D_{3}	D_{4}
D_{14} Ore. (sp) Retired	D_{13} Minn. Retired	D_{12} Calif. Retired	D_{11} Del. Ran	D_{10} Tenn. No election (Note: Democrat Andrew Johnson remained in the Senate following the secession of Tennessee until his resignation on March 4, 1862. No election was held for this seat in 1862 or 1863.)	D_{9} Mo. (sp) Expelled (Note: Democrat Waldo P. Johnson was expelled on January 10, 1862, and was succeeded in the interim by Unionist Robert Wilson. Radical B. Gratz Brown won the special election for the unexpired term.)	D_{8} Mo. (reg) Expelled (Note: Democrat Trusten Polk was expelled on January 10, 1862, and was succeeded in the interim by Unionist John B. Henderson. Henderson won the special election for the unexpired term and was re-elected to the next term as a Republican–Unionist.)	D_{7} Ind. Expelled (Note: Democrat Jesse D. Bright was expelled on February 5, 1862, and succeeded in the interim by Unionist Joseph A. Wright. Democrat David Turpie won the special election for the unexpired term and Democrat Thomas A. Hendricks won the regular election for the next term.)	D_{6} N.J. Died (Note: Democrat John R. Thomson died on September 12, 1862, and was succeeded in the interim by Unionist Richard S. Field. Democrat James W. Wall won the special election for the unexpired term and Democrat William Wright won the regular election for the next term.)	D_{5}
U_{1}	U_{2}	U_{3} Va. Ran	U_{4} Md. Retired	R_{31} Ill. (sp) Retired	R_{30} Wis. Ran	R_{29} Vt. Ran	R_{28} R.I. Ran (Note: Republican James F. Simmons resigned on August 15, 1862, after losing the regular election for the next term. Constitutional Unionist Samuel G. Arnold won the special election for the remainder of the unexpired term and was succeeded by Constitutional Unionist William Sprague, who had defeated Simmons.)	R_{27} Pa. Ran	R_{26} Ohio Ran
Majority →									R_{25} N.Y. Ran
R_{16}	R_{17}	R_{18}	R_{19}	R_{20} Mich. (sp) Died	R_{21} Conn. Ran	R_{22} Maine Ran	R_{23} Mass. Ran	R_{24} Mich. (reg) Ran	R_{25} N.Y. Ran
R_{15}	R_{14}	R_{13}	R_{12}	R_{11}	R_{10}	R_{9}	R_{8}	R_{7}	R_{6}
V_{15}	V_{16}	V_{17} Fla. No election	V_{18} Miss. No election	V_{19} Texas No election	R_{1}	R_{2}	R_{3}	R_{4}	R_{5}
V_{14}	V_{13}	V_{12}	V_{11}						

=== After the elections ===
Unionist Thomas H. Hicks was appointed to fill the vacancy created by the death of James A. Pearce of Maryland, flipping the seat from Democratic to Union.

V_{5}	V_{4}	V_{3}	V_{2}	V_{1}					
V_{6}	V_{7}	V_{8}	V_{9}	V_{10}	D_{1}	D_{2}	D_{3}	D_{4}	D_{5} Del. Re-elected
CU_{1} R.I. Gain	U_{5} Md. (ap) Gain	U_{4} Va. Hold	U_{3} Md. Gain	U_{2}	U_{1}	D_{9} Pa. Gain	D_{8} N.J. Gain	D_{7} Ind. Gain	D_{6} Ill. (sp) Gain
RU_{35} W.V. Gain	RU_{34} W.V. Gain	RU_{33} Ore. (sp) Gain	RU_{32} Mo. (sp) Gain	RU_{31} Mo. (reg) Gain	RU_{30} Minn. Gain	RU_{29} Calif. Gain	RU_{28} N.Y. Hold	RU_{27} Mich. (sp) Hold	RU_{26} Wis. Re-elected
Majority →									RU_{25} Vt. Re-elected
RU_{16}	RU_{17}	RU_{18}	RU_{19}	RU_{20} Conn. Re-elected	RU_{21} Maine Re-elected	RU_{22} Mass. Re-elected	RU_{23} Mich. (reg) Re-elected	RU_{24} Ohio Re-elected	RU_{25} Vt. Re-elected
RU_{15}	RU_{14}	RU_{13}	RU_{12}	RU_{11}	RU_{10}	RU_{9}	RU_{8}	RU_{7}	RU_{6}
V_{16}	V_{17} Fla. Hold	V_{18} Miss. Hold	V_{19} Texas Hold	V_{20} Tenn. D Loss	RU_{1}	RU_{2}	RU_{3}	RU_{4}	RU_{5}
V_{15}	V_{14}	V_{13}	V_{12}	V_{11}					

=== Beginning of the first session ===
Constitutional Unionist William Sprague of Rhode Island joined the Republican–Union caucus at the beginning of the 38th Congress, increasing their caucus to 36 seats.

V_{5}	V_{4}	V_{3}	V_{2}	V_{1}					
V_{6}	V_{7}	V_{8}	V_{9}	V_{10}	D_{1}	D_{2}	D_{3}	D_{4}	D_{5}
RU_{36} R.I. Changed	U_{5}	U_{4}	U_{3}	U_{2}	U_{1}	D_{9}	D_{8}	D_{7}	D_{6}
RU_{35}	RU_{34}	RU_{33}	RU_{32}	RU_{31}	RU_{30}	RU_{29}	RU_{28}	RU_{27}	RU_{26}
Majority →									RU_{25}
RU_{16}	RU_{17}	RU_{18}	RU_{19}	RU_{20}	RU_{21}	RU_{22}	RU_{23}	RU_{24}	RU_{25}
RU_{15}	RU_{14}	RU_{13}	RU_{12}	RU_{11}	RU_{10}	RU_{9}	RU_{8}	RU_{7}	RU_{6}
V_{16}	V_{17}	V_{18}	V_{19}	V_{20}	RU_{1}	RU_{2}	RU_{3}	RU_{4}	RU_{5}
V_{15}	V_{14}	V_{13}	V_{12}	V_{11}					

Key:

CU_{#}	Constitutional Union
D_{#}	Democratic
R_{#}	Republican
RU_{#}	Republican–Union
U_{#}	Union
V_{#}	Vacant

== Race summaries ==
=== Special elections during the preceding Congress ===
Special elections were held to fill six vacancies in the 37th United States Congress.

State	Incumbent			This race	
State	Senator	Party	Electoral history	Results	Candidates
Michigan (Class 2)	Kinsley S. Bingham	Republican	1858	Incumbent died October 5, 1861. Republican hold.	First ballot (January 4, 1862): ▌ ✓ Jacob M. Howard (Republican) 75 H; 28 S; ▌Alpheus Felch (Democratic) 10 H; 2 S
Oregon (Class 2)	Benjamin Stark	Democratic	1862 (ap.)	Interim appointee retired. Union gain.	Thirtieth ballot (September 12, 1862): ▌ ✓ Benjamin F. Harding (Union) 28; ▌Henry W. Corbett (Union) 11; ▌George H. Williams (Union) 5; ▌John Whiteaker (Democratic) 3; Blank 1
Rhode Island (Class 1)	James F. Simmons	Republican	1841; 1847 (l.r.); 1857; 1862 (l.r.)	Incumbent resigned August 15, 1862. Constitutional Union gain.	First ballot (September 5, 1862): ▌ ✓ Samuel G. Arnold (Constitutional Union) 71; ▌Nathan F. Dixon (Republican) 7; Scattering 3
Missouri (Class 1)	John B. Henderson	Union	1862 (ap.)	Interim appointee elected as an Emancipationist. Emancipation gain.	First ballot (January 6, 1863): ▌ ✓ John B. Henderson (Emancipation) 104; ▌Robert Wilson (Union) 47; ▌William A. Hall (Democratic) 1
Illinois (Class 2)	Orville H. Browning	Republican	1861 (ap.)	Interim appointee retired. Democratic gain.	First ballot (January 12, 1863): ▌ ✓ William Richardson (Democratic) 65; ▌Richard Yates (Union) 38
Indiana (Class 1)	Joseph A. Wright	Union	1862 (ap.)	Interim appointee retired. Democratic gain.	First ballot (January 14, 1863): ▌ ✓ David Turpie (Democratic) 85; ▌Daniel D. Pratt (Union) 62
New Jersey (Class 1)	Richard S. Field	Union	1862 (ap.)	Interim appointee lost re-election. Democratic gain.	First ballot (January 14, 1863): ▌ ✓ James W. Wall (Democratic) 53; ▌Richard S. Field (Union) 23; ▌William A. Newell (Union) 2; ▌ William Cook (Democratic) 1

=== Elections leading to the next Congress ===
Eighteen senators were elected for the term beginning March 4, 1863.

State	Incumbent			This race	
State	Senator	Party	Electoral history	Results	Candidates
California	Milton Latham	Democratic	1860 (sp.)	Incumbent retired. Union gain.	First ballot (February 10, 1863): ▌ ✓ John Conness (Union) 98; ▌Benjamin Shurtleff (Democratic) 15; ▌Joseph P. Hoge (Democratic) 1
Connecticut	James Dixon	Republican	1856	Incumbent re-elected as a Unionist. Union gain.	First ballot (May 22, 1862): ▌ ✓ James Dixon (Union) 162 H; 19 S; ▌Charles Chapman (Democratic) 57 H; 0 S; ▌William A. Buckingham (Union) 2 H; 0 S; ▌Orris S. Ferry (Union) 2 H; 0 S; Blank 1 H; 1 S
Delaware	James A. Bayard	Democratic	1851; 1857	Incumbent re-elected.	First ballot (January 8, 1863): ▌ ✓ James A. Bayard Jr. (Democratic) 19; ▌Edward G. Bradford (Union) 10
Florida	Vacant			Seat vacant since March 14, 1861. No election.	None.
Indiana	Joseph A. Wright	Union	1862 (ap.)	Interim appointee lost re-election. Democratic gain.	First ballot (January 14, 1863): ▌ ✓ Thomas A. Hendricks (Democratic) 85; ▌Joseph A. Wright (Union) 61; ▌Schuyler Colfax (Union) 1
Maine	Lot M. Morrill	Republican	1861 (sp.)	Incumbent re-elected.	First ballot (January 13, 1863): ▌ ✓ Lot M. Morrill (Republican) 95 H; 25 S; ▌William Pickering Haines (Democratic) 42 H; 1 S; ▌Israel Washburn Jr. (Republican) 1 H; 0 S; ▌Edward Kent (Republican) 1 H; 0 S
Maryland	Anthony Kennedy	Union	1856–57	Incumbent retired. Union hold.	First ballot (March 5, 1862): ▌ ✓ Reverdy Johnson (Union) 56; Blank 28
Massachusetts	Charles Sumner	Republican	1851; 1857	Incumbent re-elected.	First ballot (January 15, 1863): ▌ ✓ Charles Sumner (Republican) 194 H; 33 S; ▌Josiah G. Abbott (People's) 38 H; 5 S; ▌Caleb Cushing (Democratic) 2 H; 0 S; ▌Charles F. Adams (Republican) 1 H; 1 S
Michigan	Zachariah Chandler	Republican	1857	Incumbent re-elected.	First ballot (January 8, 1863): ▌ ✓ Zachariah Chandler (Republican) 60 H; 18 S; ▌James F. Joy (Democratic) 34 H; 11 S; ▌Alpheus Felch (Democratic) 0 H; 2 S; Scattering 1 H; 1 S
Minnesota	Henry Mower Rice	Democratic	1858	Incumbent retired. Republican gain.	First ballot (January 14, 1863): ▌ ✓ Alexander Ramsey (Republican) 45; ▌Andrew G. Chatfield (Democratic) 17
Mississippi	Vacant			Seat vacant since March 14, 1861. No election.	None.
Missouri	John B. Henderson	Emancipation	1863 (sp.)	Incumbent re-elected as a Radical. Radical gain.	First ballot (November 13, 1863): ▌ ✓ John B. Henderson (Radical) 84; ▌John S. Phelps (Conservative) 42; ▌Benjamin F. Loan (Radical) 7; ▌William A. Hall (Democratic) 3; Scattering 2
New Jersey	James W. Wall	Democratic	1863 (sp.)	Incumbent lost re-nomination. Democratic hold.	First ballot (February 26, 1863): ▌ ✓ William Wright (Democratic) 54; ▌William A. Newell (Union) 25
New York	Preston King	Republican	1857	Incumbent lost renomination as a Unionist. Union gain.	First ballot (February 3, 1863): ▌ ✓ Edwin D. Morgan (Union) 86; ▌Erastus Corning (Democratic) 70; Scattering 2
Ohio	Benjamin Wade	Union	1851; 1856 (Note: Wade was re-elected as a Republican in 1856 and became a Unionist in 1861.)	Incumbent re-elected.	First ballot (January 22, 1863): ▌ ✓ Benjamin Wade (Union) 75; ▌Hugh J. Jewett (Democratic) 35; ▌Thomas Ewing (Union) 15; ▌Robert C. Schenck (Union) 1
Pennsylvania	David Wilmot	Republican	1861 (sp.)	Incumbent lost renomination as a Unionist. Democratic gain.	First ballot (January 13, 1863): ▌ ✓ Charles R. Buckalew (Democratic) 67; ▌Simon Cameron (Union) 65; ▌William D. Kelley (Union) 1
Rhode Island	James F. Simmons	Republican	1841; 1847 (l.r.); 1857	Incumbent lost re-election. Constitutional Union gain. Incumbent resigned August 15, 1862, leading to a special election; see above.	First ballot (May 28, 1862): ▌ ✓ William Sprague (Constitutional Union) 92; ▌James F. Simmons (Republican) 5; ▌Nathan F. Dixon (Republican) 5; ▌Thomas G. Turner (Republican) 1
Tennessee	Vacant			Seat vacant from March 4, 1862. No election.	None.
Texas	Vacant			Seat vacant from July 11, 1861. No election.	None.
Vermont	Solomon Foot	Republican	1850; 1856	Incumbent re-elected.	First ballot (October 14, 1862): ▌ ✓ Solomon Foot (Republican) 206 H; 30 S; ▌Daniel Kellogg (Democratic) 3 H; 0 S; ▌Paul Dillingham (Democratic) 2 H; 0 S; Scattering 2 H; 0 S
Virginia	Waitman T. Willey	Union	1861 (sp.)	Incumbent lost re-election. Union hold.	Second ballot (January 23, 1863): ▌ ✓ Lemuel J. Bowden (Union) 29; ▌Waitman T. Willey (Union) 19; ▌Daniel Lamb (Union) 1
West Virginia 2 seats	None (new state)			Seat created June 20, 1863. Union gain.	First ballot (August 4, 1863): ▌ ✓ Waitman T. Willey (Union) 50; ▌Archibald W. Campbell (Union) 27; ▌Benjamin H. Smith (Union) 24; ▌Peter G. Van Winkle (Union) 22; ▌Daniel Lamb (Union) 5; ▌George W. Summers (Unknown) 3; Scattering 2; Sixth ballot (August 4, 1863): ▌ ✓ Peter G. Van Winkle (Union) 46; ▌Archibald W. Campbell (Union) 12; ▌George W. Summers (Unknown) 6; ▌Benjamin H. Smith (Union) 2; ▌Thomas K. McCann (Union) 1
West Virginia 2 seats	None (new state)			Seat created June 20, 1863. Union gain.	First ballot (August 4, 1863): ▌ ✓ Waitman T. Willey (Union) 50; ▌Archibald W. Campbell (Union) 27; ▌Benjamin H. Smith (Union) 24; ▌Peter G. Van Winkle (Union) 22; ▌Daniel Lamb (Union) 5; ▌George W. Summers (Unknown) 3; Scattering 2; Sixth ballot (August 4, 1863): ▌ ✓ Peter G. Van Winkle (Union) 46; ▌Archibald W. Campbell (Union) 12; ▌George W. Summers (Unknown) 6; ▌Benjamin H. Smith (Union) 2; ▌Thomas K. McCann (Union) 1
Wisconsin	James R. Doolittle	Republican	1857	Incumbent re-elected.	First ballot (January 22, 1863): ▌ ✓ James R. Doolittle (Republican) 73; ▌Edward George Ryan (Democratic) 57; Scattering 2

=== Special elections during the next Congress ===
In these elections, the winners were elected in 1863 after March 4; ordered by election date.

State	Incumbent			This race	
State	Senator	Party	Electoral history	Results	Candidates
Missouri (Class 3)	Robert Wilson	Union	1862 (ap.)	Interim appointee retired. New senator elected November 13, 1863. Radical gain.	32nd ballot (November 13, 1863): ▌ ✓ B. Gratz Brown (Radical) 74; ▌James Broadhead (Conservative) 65; ▌H. M. Vorhies (Unknown) 2

== California ==
California election
- February 10, 1863

Members of the California State Legislature Majority of voting members needed to win
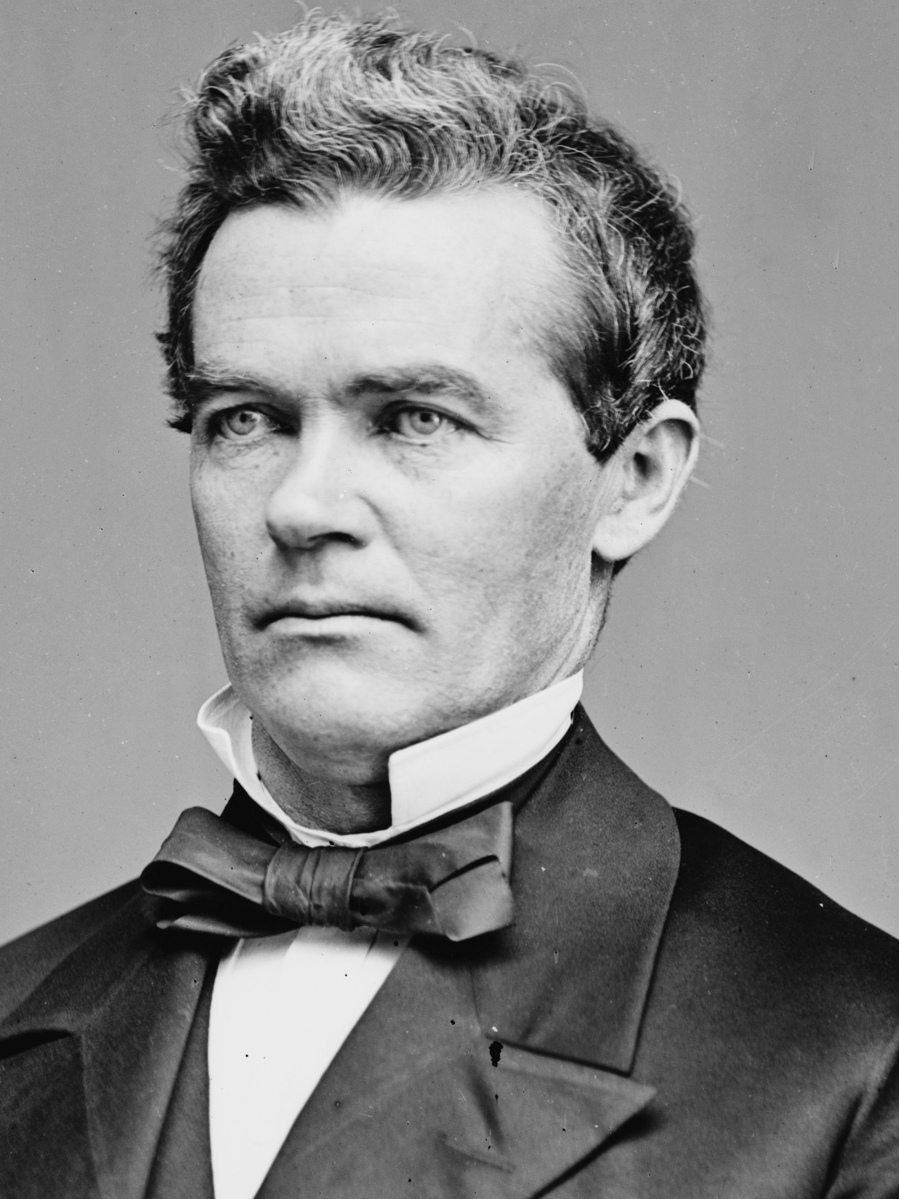

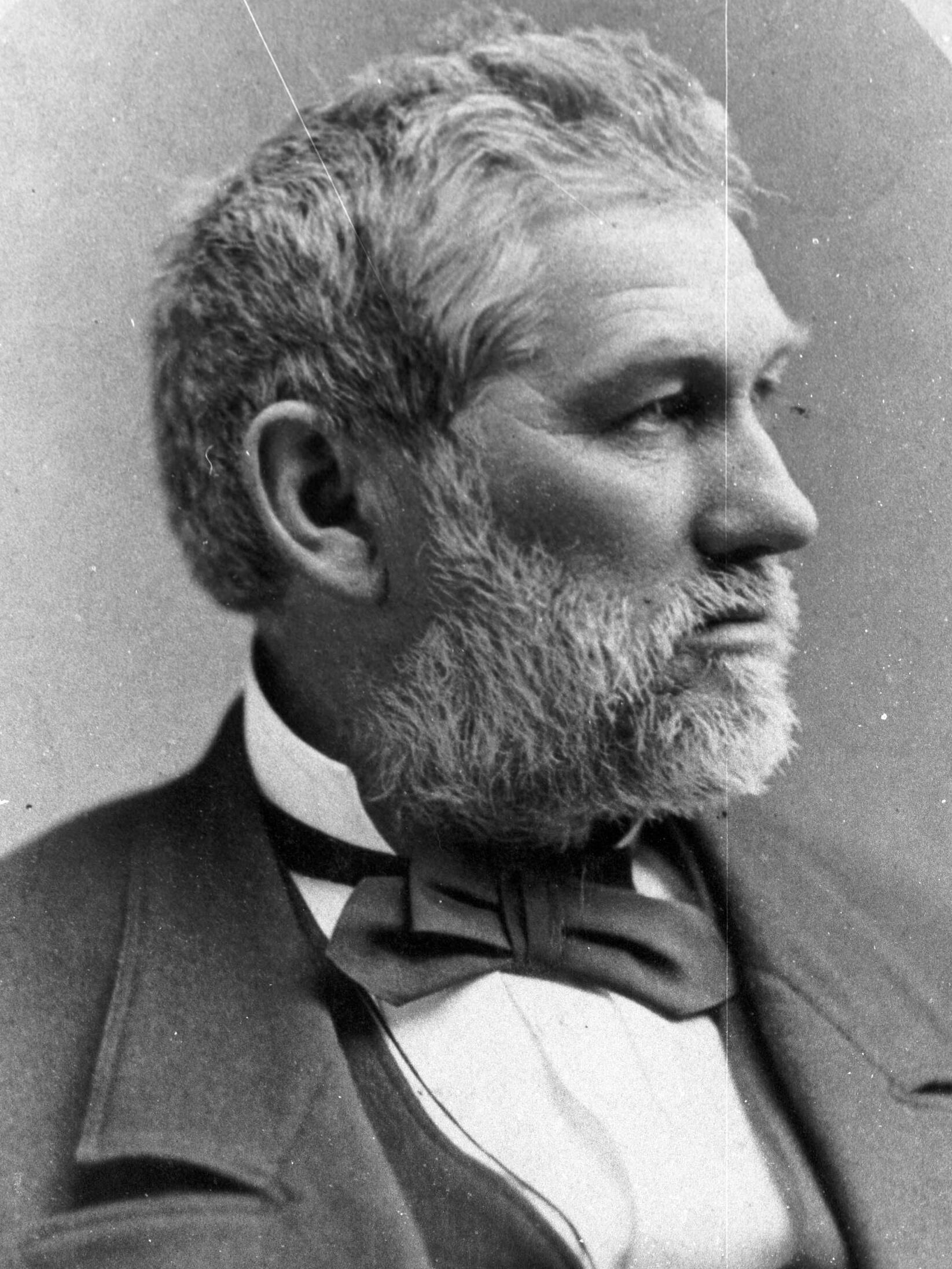
Nominee	John Conness	Benjamin Shurtleff
Party	Union	Democratic
1st ballot	98 (86.0%)	15 (13.2%)
Senator before election
Milton Latham
Lecompton Democratic
Elected Senator
John Conness
Union

Incumbent Democrat Milton Latham was elected in 1860 to fill the vacancy created by the death of David C. Broderick. He was not a candidate for re-election.

The Union members of the legislature held a caucus from January 13 to February 9, 1863. Timothy Guy Phelps, John Conness, Aaron A. Sargent, and Trenor W. Park were the major candidates. Phelps led on the first ballot, but without a majority. During the voting, an internal inquiry found that Phelps's supporters had offered bribes to several members in exchange for their votes. Although Phelps denied the allegations, the appearance of corruption effectively ended his candidacy. Conness was nominated on the final ballot with 60 votes to 29 for Sargent, three for Phelps, and eight for other candidates.

The California State Legislature met in joint session on February 10, 1863, to hold an election for the next term. Conness defeated Democratic candidate Benjamin Shurtleff on the first ballot.

== Connecticut ==
Connecticut election
- May 22, 1862

Members of the Connecticut General Assembly Majority in both houses needed to win
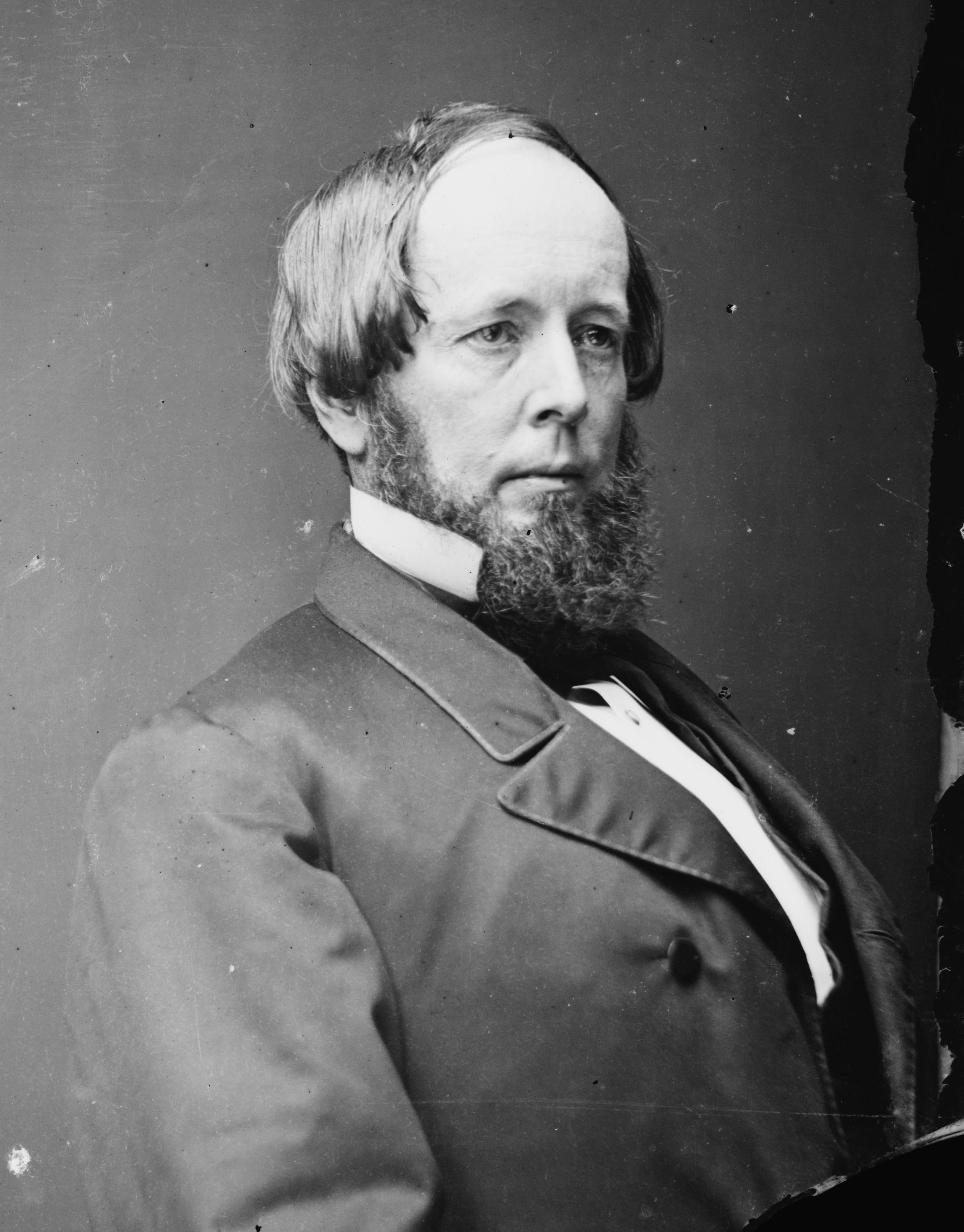

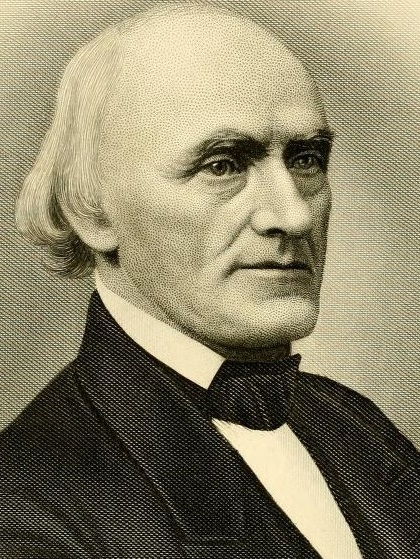
Nominee	James Dixon	Charles Chapman
Party	Union	Democratic
House	162 (72.3%)	57 (25.4%)
Senate	19 (95.0%)	—
Senator before election
James Dixon
Republican
Elected Senator
James Dixon
Union

One-term Republican James Dixon was elected in 1856.

The Union members of the legislature held a caucus on May 15, 1862. Dixon, William A. Buckingham, Roger Sherman Baldwin, and Orris S. Ferry were the leading candidates. Dixon defeated the other candidates on the first ballot.

The Senate and the House of Representatives met separately on May 22, 1862, to hold an election for the next term. Dixon defeated Democratic candidate Charles Chapman on the first ballot.

== Delaware ==
Delaware election
- January 8, 1863

Members of the Delaware General Assembly Majority of voting members needed to win
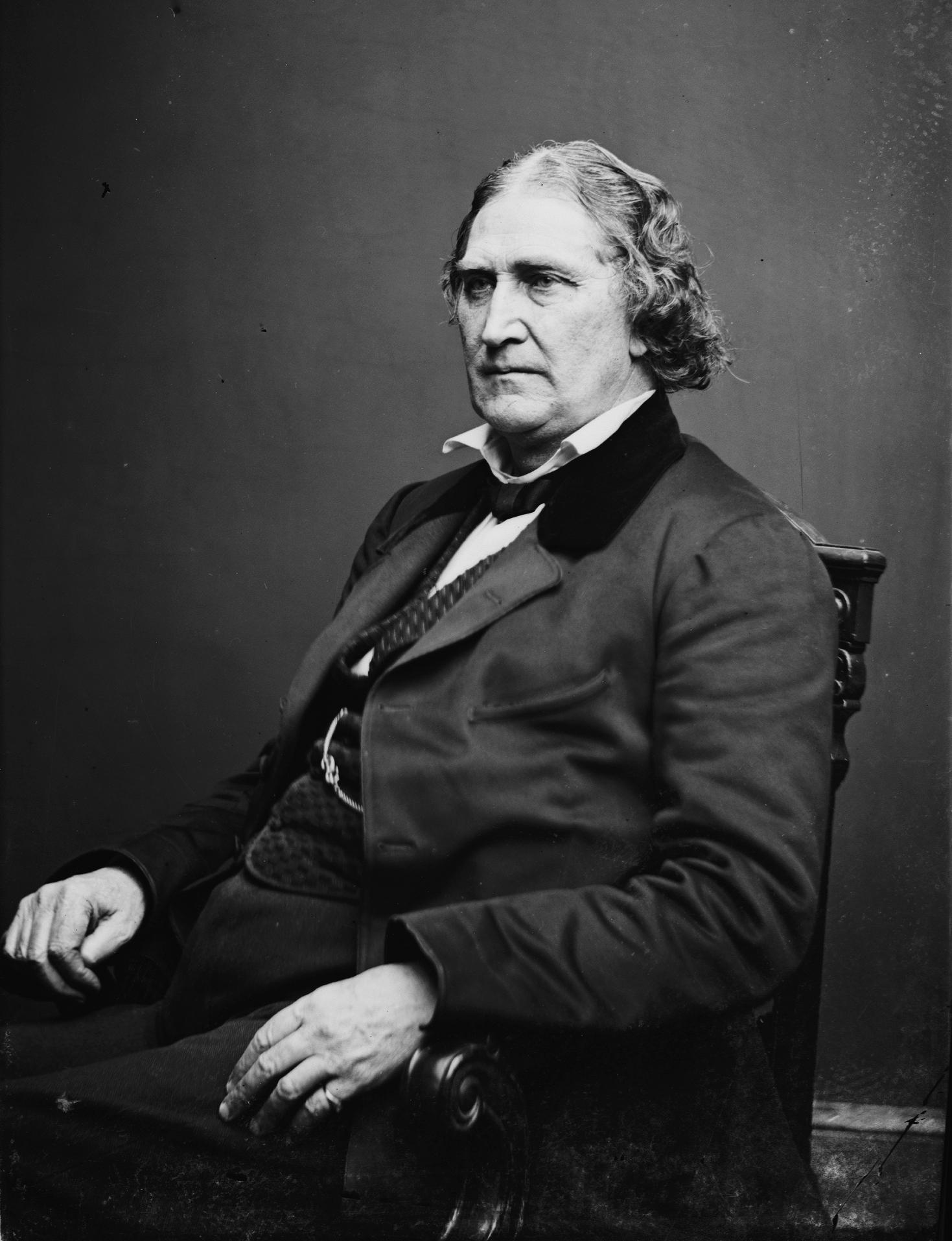

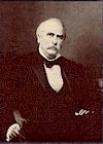
Nominee	James A. Bayard Jr.	Edward Green Bradford
Party	Democratic	Union
1st ballot	19 (65.5%)	10 (34.5%)
Senator before election
James A. Bayard Jr.
Democratic
Elected Senator
James A. Bayard Jr.
Democratic

Two-term Democrat James A. Bayard Jr. was re-elected in 1857.

A coalition of Republicans and War Democrats organized the Union Party in Delaware ahead of the 1862 state elections. Unionist William Cannon won the 1862 Delaware gubernatorial election, but Democrats retained narrow majorities in both chambers of the legislature.

The Delaware General Assembly met in joint session on January 8, 1863, to hold an election for the next term. Bayard defeated Union candidate Edward Green Bradford on the first ballot.

== Florida ==
Florida election
- No election
Senator before election
None (vacant from March 14, 1861)
Elected Senator
None

Two-term Democrat Stephen Mallory withdrew from the Senate on March 14, 1861, following the secession of Florida. The Florida Legislature did not hold an election for the next term, and the seat remained vacant until 1868.

== Illinois (special) ==
Illinois special election
- January 12, 1863

Members of the Illinois General Assembly Majority of voting members needed to win
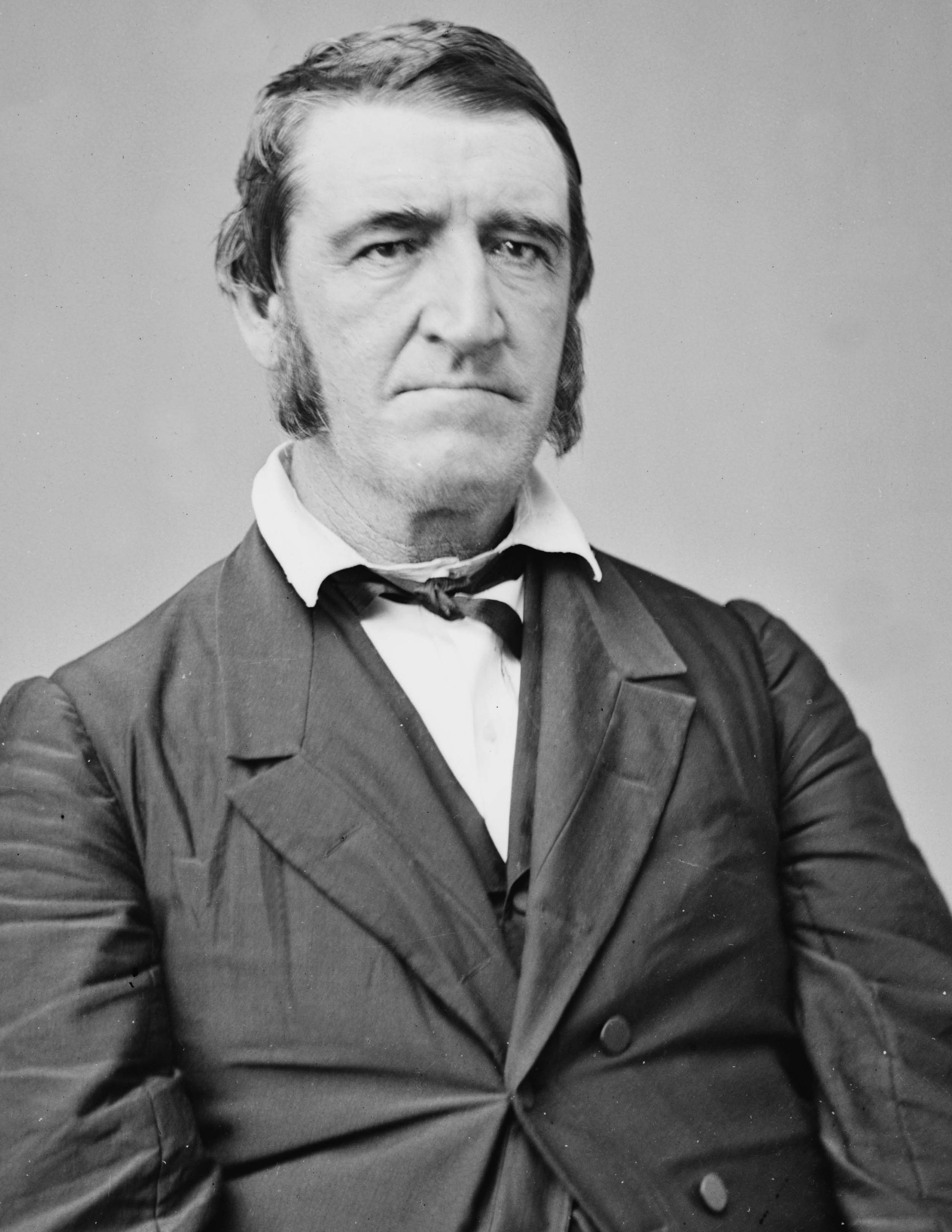

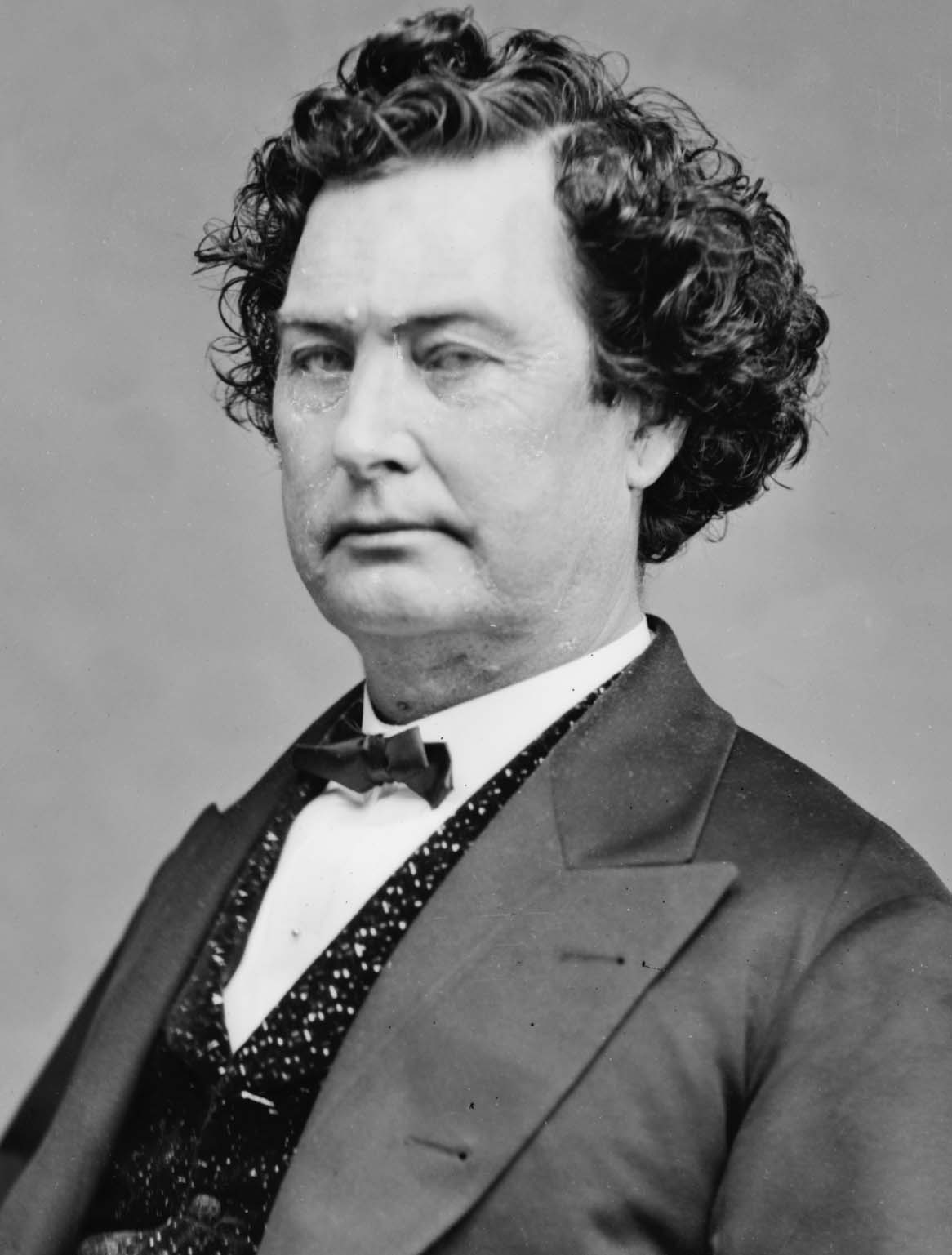
Nominee	William Alexander Richardson	Richard Yates Sr.
Party	Democratic	Union
1st ballot	65 (63.1%)	38 (36.9%)
Senator before election
Orville Hickman Browning
Republican
Elected Senator
William Alexander Richardson
Democratic

Incumbent Republican Orville Hickman Browning was appointed in 1861 to fill the vacancy created by the death of Stephen A. Douglas. He was not a candidate for re-election.

The Union Party was initially confident in its ability to retain control of the Illinois General Assembly, a feat which would allow it to elect a senator to complete Douglas's unexpired term. The campaign was interrupted by the preliminary Emancipation Proclamation in September 1862. The proclamation inflamed factional conflicts within the Union Party and emboldened the Democratic opposition, who accused Unionists of seeking to "Africanize" Illinois. Democrats won the 1862 elections in Illinois, carrying nine of the state's fourteen congressional districts and a 27-seat majority in the legislature.

The legislature met on January 12, 1863, to hold a special election for the unexpired term. Democratic candidate William Alexander Richardson defeated Union candidate Richard Yates Sr. on the first ballot.

== Indiana ==
Incumbent Unionist Joseph A. Wright was appointed in 1862 to fill the vacancy created by the expulsion of Jesse D. Bright. With Bright's expulsion coming little more than a year before the end of his term on March 4, 1863, the Indiana General Assembly held concurrent elections in January 1863: a special election for the remainder of the unexpired term, and the regularly scheduled election for the next term.

Wright and Bright had waged a bitter struggle for control of the Indiana Democratic Party during the preceding decade; by appointing Wright to Bright's former seat in the Senate, Indiana governor Oliver P. Morton helped to bring Wright's War Democratic supporters into Indiana's nascent Union Party. From the outset of the campaign, Democrats accused the Lincoln administration of using the war as a pretext for emancipation. These fears were seemingly vindicated by the appearance of the preliminary Emancipation Proclamation in September 1862. Democrats launched an unprecedented racist campaign against the proclamation that confounded the efforts of moderate Unionists to defend emancipation as a military necessity. In the October legislative elections, Democrats won majorities in both chambers of the General Assembly, paving the way for the election of a Democratic senator in January.

The Democratic members of the legislature held a caucus on January 9, 1863. Bright hoped to receive his party's nomination to return to the Senate, but the caucus was controlled by conditional War Democrats who opposed Bright's uncompromising anti-war stance. The legislators nominated David Turpie for the unexpired term and Thomas A. Hendricks for the next term.

The General Assembly met in joint session on January 14, 1863, to hold concurrent elections for both terms. Turpie and Hendricks were respectively elected.

=== Indiana (special) ===
Indiana special election
- January 14, 1863

Members of the Indiana General Assembly Majority of voting members needed to win
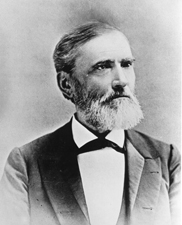

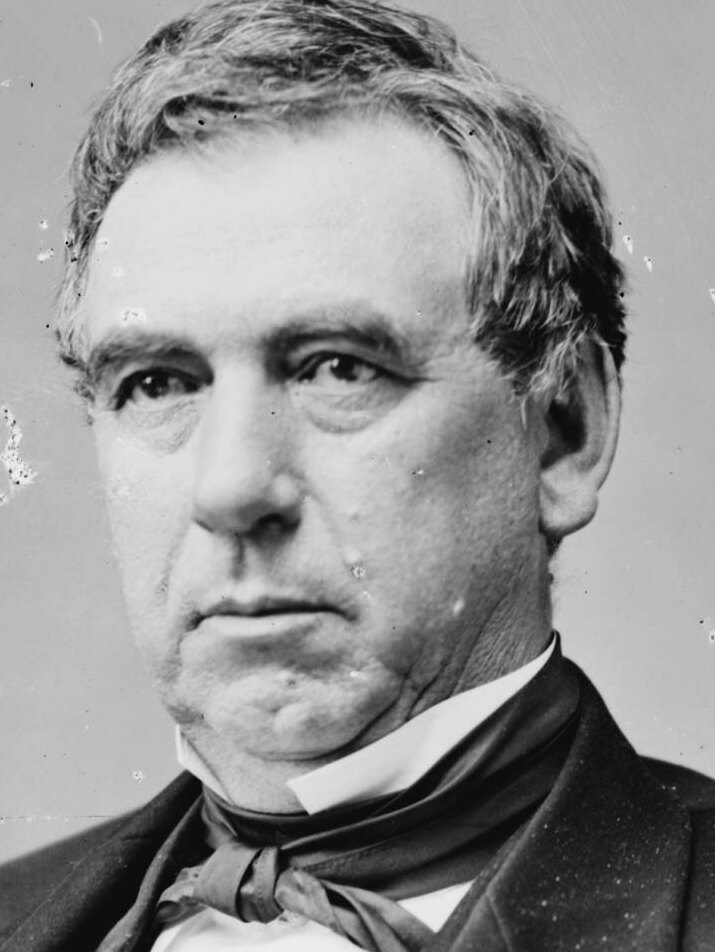
Nominee	David Turpie	Daniel D. Pratt
Party	Democratic	Union
1st ballot	85 (57.8%)	62 (42.2%)
Senator before election
Joseph A. Wright
Union
Elected Senator
David Turpie
Democratic

Wright was not a candidate in the special election. Turpie defeated Union candidate Daniel D. Pratt on the first ballot.

=== Indiana (regular) ===
Indiana election
- January 14, 1863

Members of the Indiana General Assembly Majority of voting members needed to win
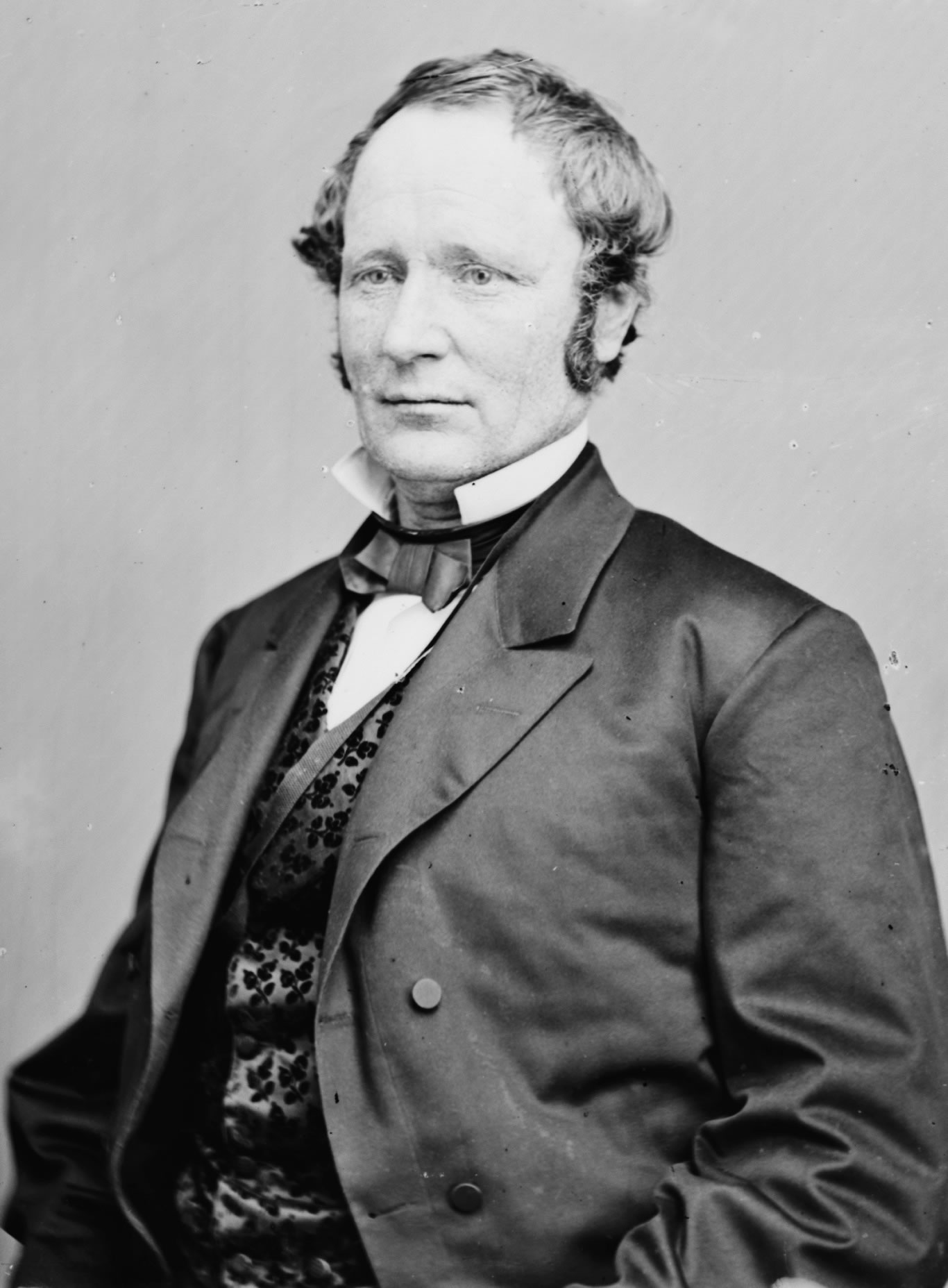

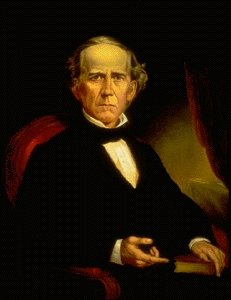
Nominee	Thomas A. Hendricks	Joseph A. Wright
Party	Democratic	Union
1st ballot	85 (57.8%)	61 (41.5%)
Senator before election
Joseph A. Wright
Union
Elected Senator
Thomas A. Hendricks
Democratic

Turpie was not a candidate for the next term. Hendricks defeated Wright on the first ballot.

== Maine ==
Maine election
- January 13, 1863

Members of the Maine Legislature Majority in both houses needed to win
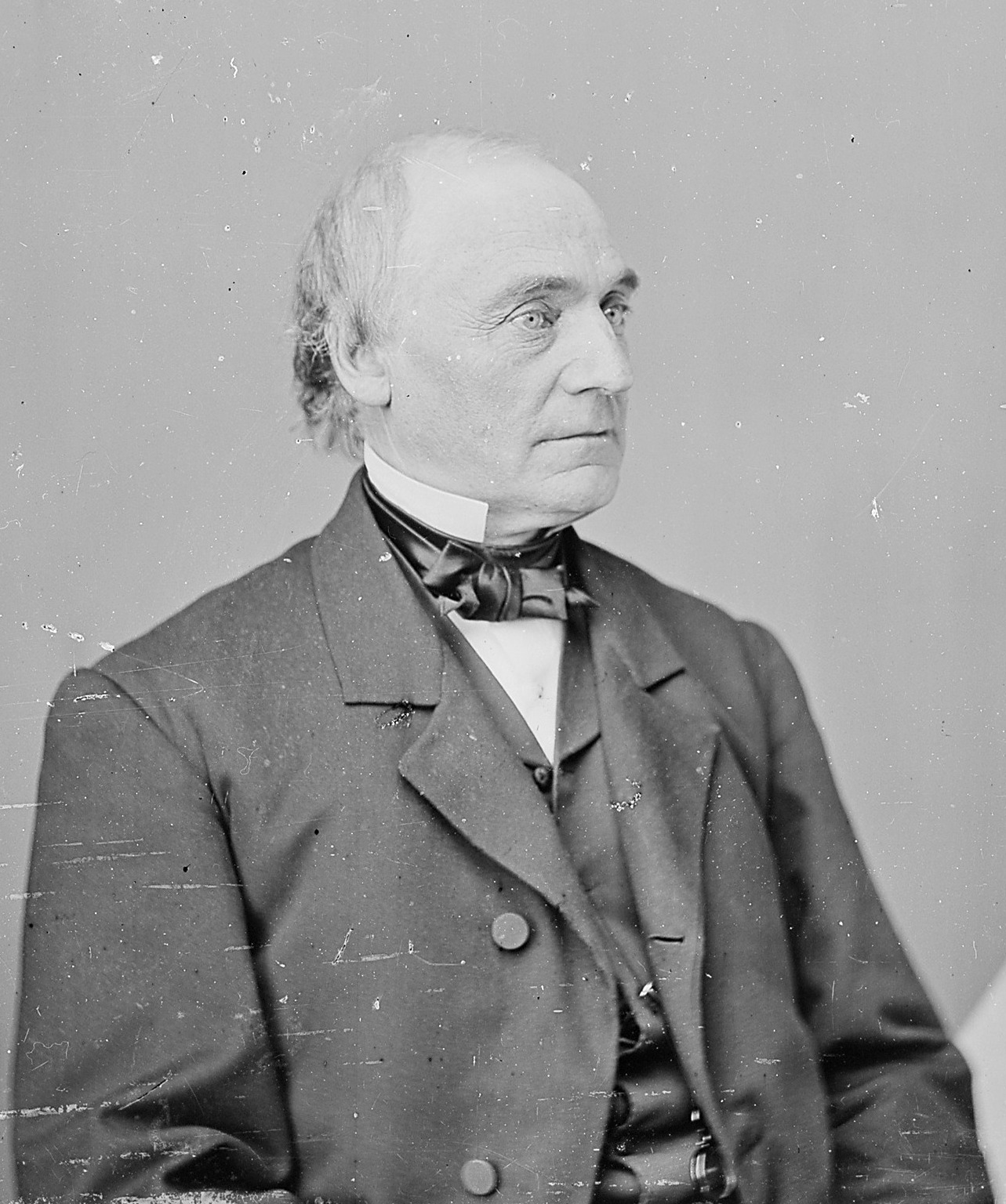

Nominee	Lot M. Morrill	William P. Haines
Party	Republican	Democratic
House	95 (68.3%)	42 (30.2%)
Senate	25 (96.2%)	1 (3.8%)
Senator before election
Lot M. Morrill
Republican
Elected Senator
Lot M. Morrill
Republican

Incumbent Republican Lot M. Morrill was elected in 1861 to fill the vacancy created by the resignation of Hannibal Hamlin.

The Senate and the House of Representatives met separately on January 13, 1863, to hold an election for the next term. Morrill defeated Democratic candidate William P. Haines on the first ballot.

== Maryland ==
Maryland election
- March 5, 1862

Members of the Maryland General Assembly Majority of voting members needed to win
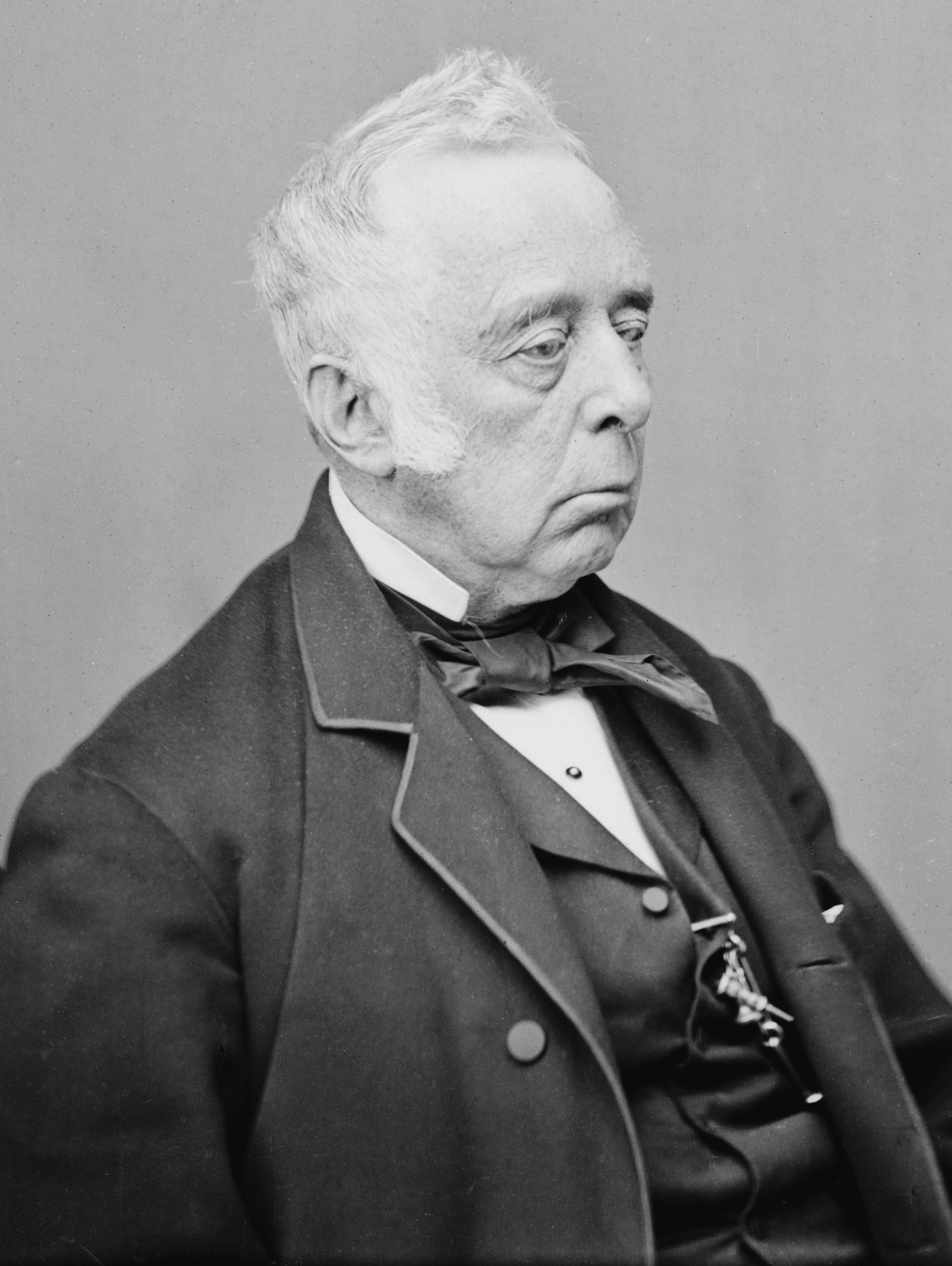

Nominee	Reverdy Johnson	Blank
Party	Union
1st ballot	56 (66.7%)	28 (33.3%)
Senator before election
Anthony Kennedy
Union
Elected Senator
Reverdy Johnson
Union

One-term Unionist Anthony Kennedy was elected in 1856 or 1857. He was not a candidate for re-election.

The Maryland General Assembly met on March 5, 1862, to hold an election for the next term. Voting proceeded separately in the Senate and the House of Delegates, after which the tellers withdrew and to count the ballots in the Senate chamber. Union candidate Reverdy Johnson was elected on the first ballot.

== Massachusetts ==
Massachusetts election
- January 15, 1863

Members of the Massachusetts General Court Majority in both houses needed to win
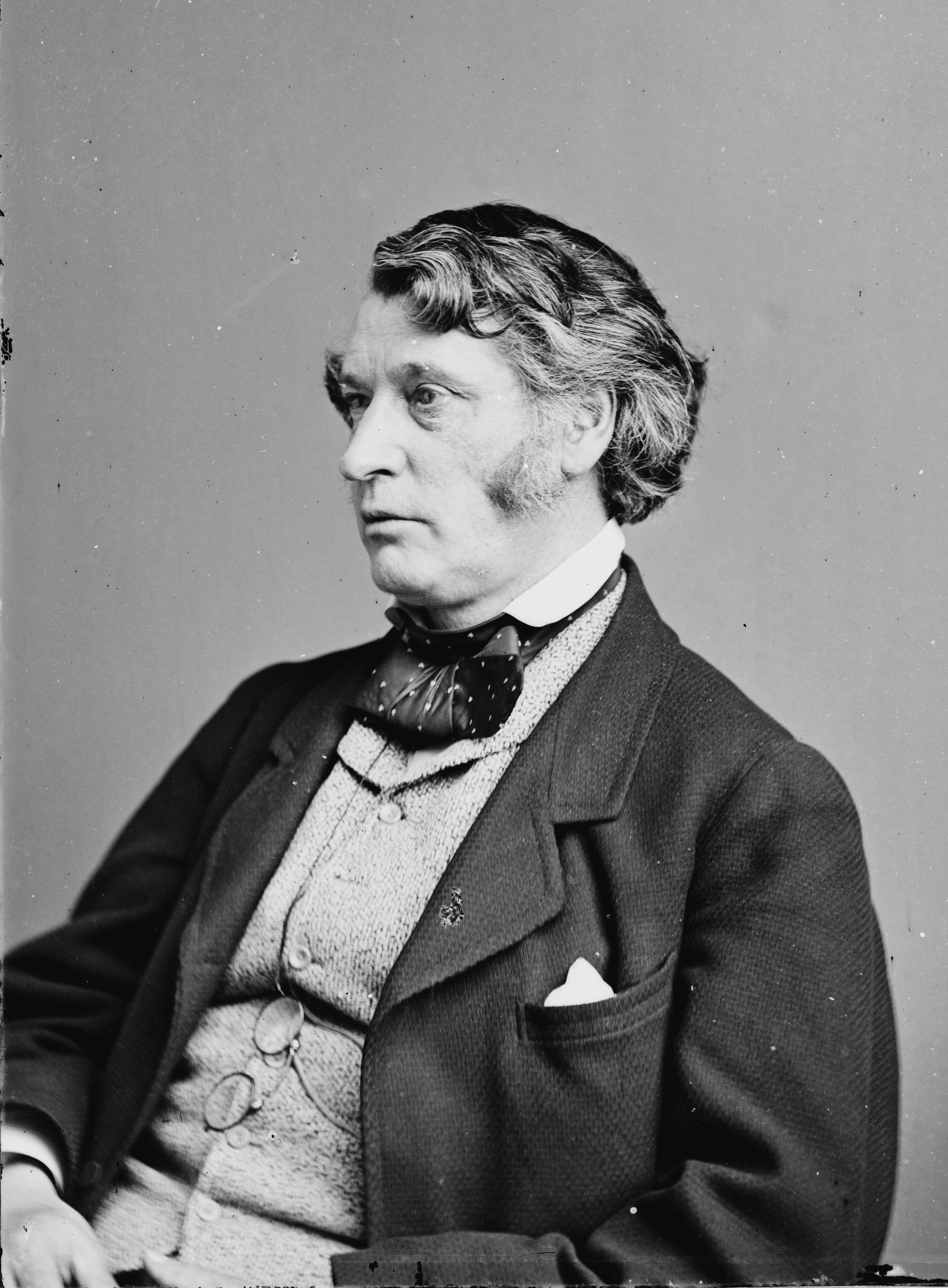

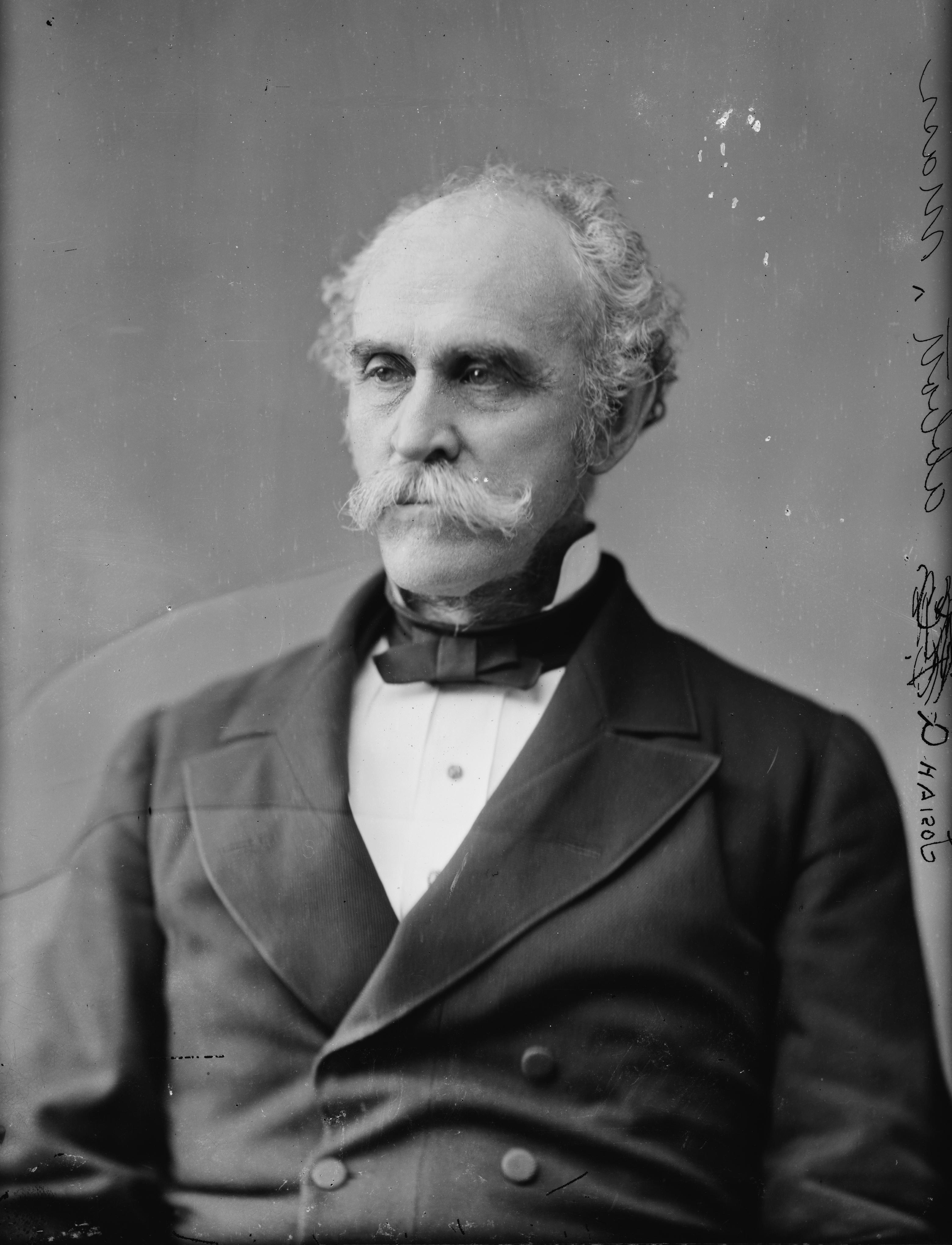
Nominee	Charles Sumner	Josiah Gardner Abbott
Party	Republican	People's
House	194 (82.6%)	38 (16.2%)
Senate	33 (84.6%)	5 (12.8%)
Senator before election
Charles Sumner
Republican
Elected Senator
Charles Sumner
Republican

Two-term Republican Charles Sumner was re-elected in 1857.

The Republican state convention met at Worcester, Massachusetts, on September 9, 1862. Sumner had earned the disapproval of conservative Republicans when he opposed Lincoln's plan for gradual emancipation in March 1862, calling instead for Congress to use its authority under the War Powers Clause to abolish slavery immediately. Seeking to preempt a movement to replace Sumner at the next senatorial election, Sumner's allies took the unusual step of having the state convention endorse his bid for re-election. A resolution endorsing Sumner and approving his record in the Senate passed over the protests of conservative delegates, in effect making Sumner's re-election the central issue of the fall campaign.

Conservative opponents of Sumner held a convention at Boston on October 7, 1862. Many of the organizers of the convention were former Whigs who had supported the Constitutional Union Party in 1860. In a nod to antipartisan wartime rhetoric, the movement called itself the People's Party; its express purpose was to defeat Sumner's bid for reelection. The convention adopted a pro-war, anti-abolitionist platform and selected candidates for the upcoming state elections; Charles F. Adams was nominated for U.S. senator, but declined. The preliminary Emancipation Proclamation, issued September 22, had brought the Lincoln administration into line with Sumner's position, while the endorsement of the People's ticket by the Massachusetts Democratic Party undermined the movement's claim to constitute the true pro-administration party in Massachusetts. Following these events, most conservative Republicans returned to the fold, and the Republican ticket was elected by a large majority.

The Senate and the House of Representatives met separately on January 15, 1863, to hold an election for the next term. Sumner defeated People's candidate Josiah Gardner Abbott on the first ballot.

== Michigan ==
There were two elections in Michigan, due to the death of Kinsley S. Bingham.

=== Michigan (special) ===
Michigan special election
- January 4, 1862

Members of the Michigan Legislature Majority in both houses needed to win
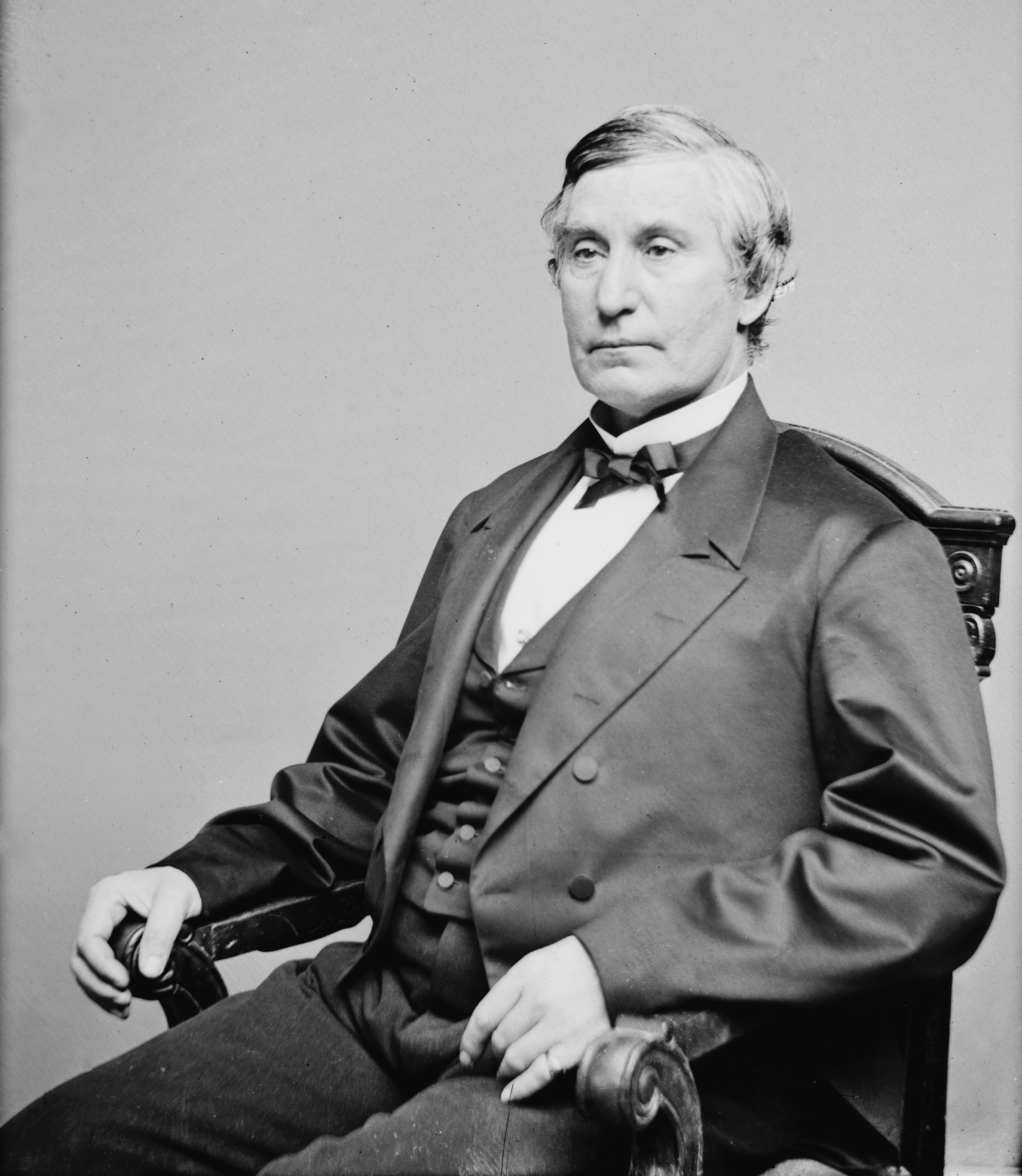

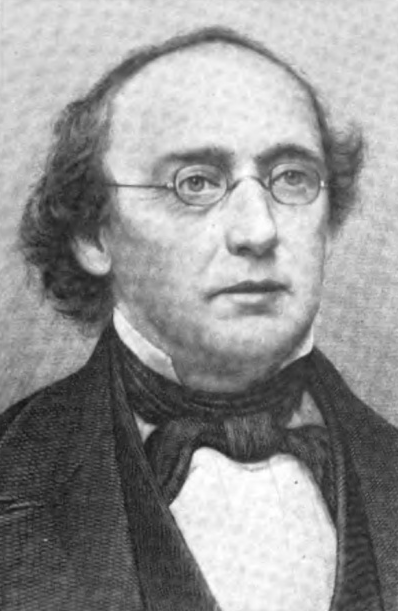
Nominee	Jacob M. Howard	Alpheus Felch
Party	Republican	Democratic
House	75 (88.2%)	10 (11.8%)
Senate	28 (93.3%)	2 (6.7%)
Senator before election
None (vacant from October 5, 1861)
Elected Senator
Jacob M. Howard
Republican

One-term Republican Kinsley S. Bingham was elected in 1858. Bingham died on October 5, 1861, causing a special election.

The Republican members of the legislature held a caucus on January 3, 1862. Jacob M. Howard, Austin Blair, Hezekiah G. Wells, and Henry Waldron were the leading candidates. Howard was nominated on the sixth ballot.

The Senate and the House of Representatives met separately on January 4, 1862, to hold a special election for the unexpired term. Howard defeated Democratic candidate Alpheus Felch on the first ballot.

=== Michigan (regular) ===
Michigan election
- January 8, 1863

Members of the Michigan Legislature Majority in both houses needed to win
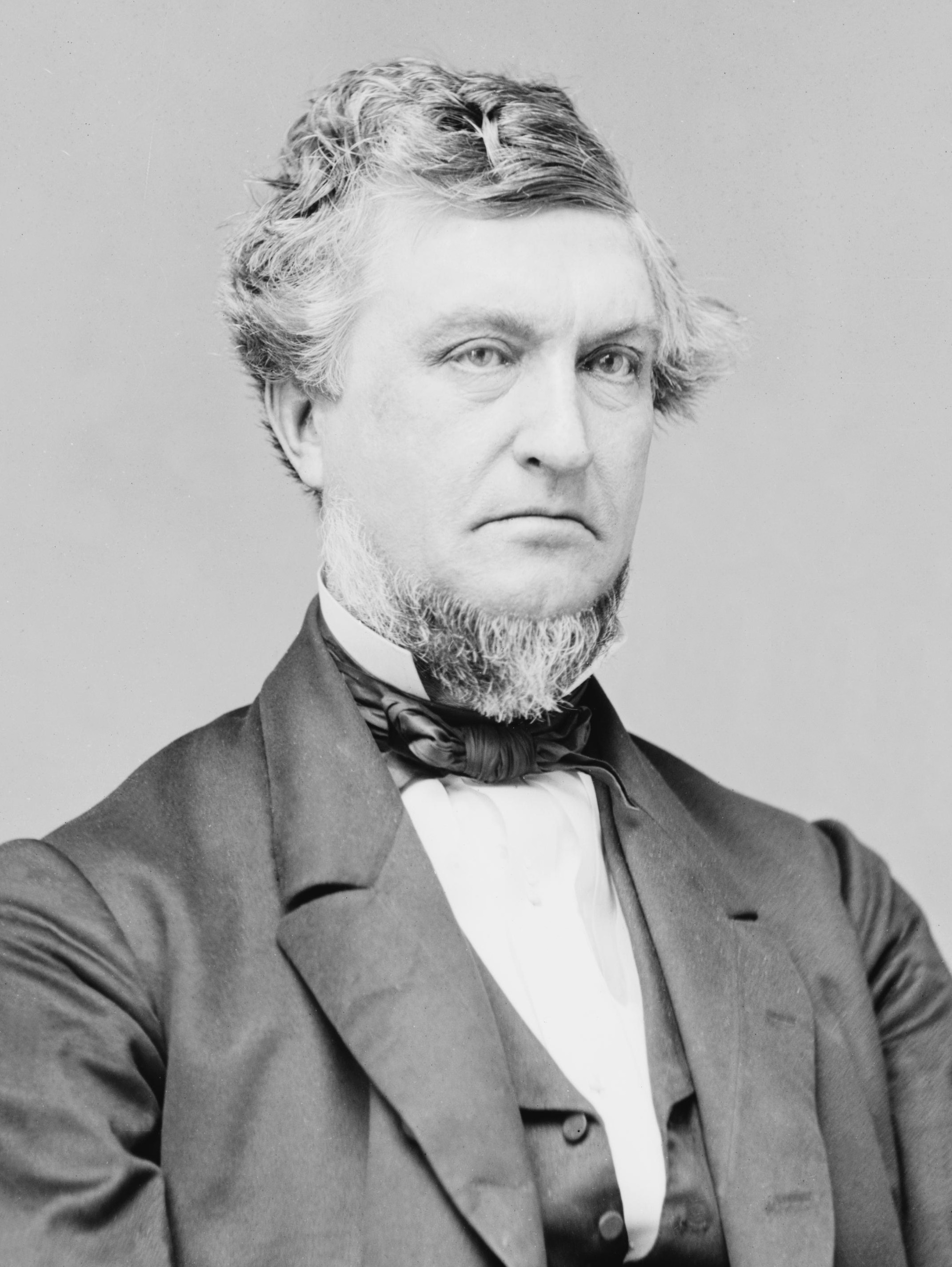

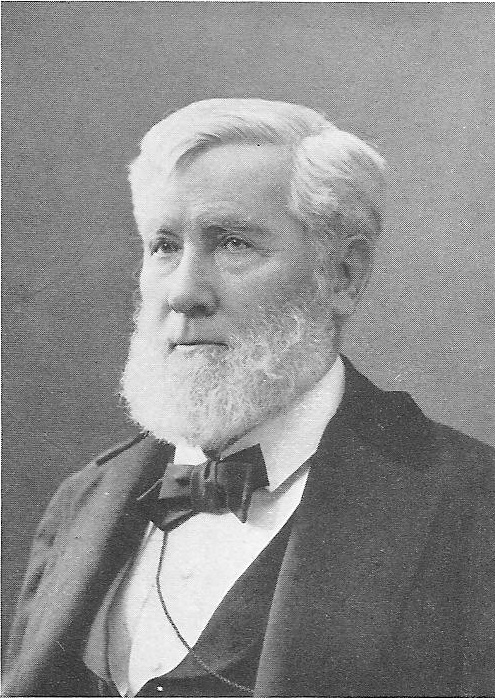

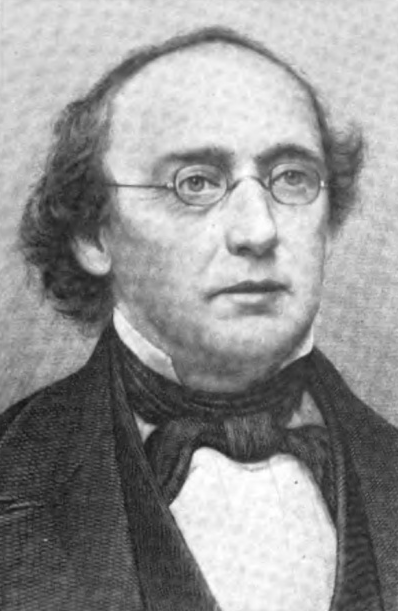
Nominee	Zachariah Chandler	James Frederick Joy	Alpheus Felch
Party	Republican	Democratic	Democratic
House	60 (63.2%)	34 (35.8%)	—
Senate	18 (56.2%)	11 (34.4%)	2 (6.2%)
Senator before election
Zachariah Chandler
Republican
Elected Senator
Zachariah Chandler
Republican

One-term Republican Zachariah Chandler was elected in 1857.

The Republican members of the legislature held a caucus on January 8, 1863. Chandler was renominated unanimously. The Democratic members met the same day and nominated James Frederick Joy over Alpheus Felch.

The Senate and the House of Representatives met separately on January 8, 1863, to hold an election for the next term. Chandler defeated Joy on the first ballot.

== Minnesota ==
Minnesota election
- January 14, 1863

Members of the Minnesota Legislature Majority of voting members needed to win
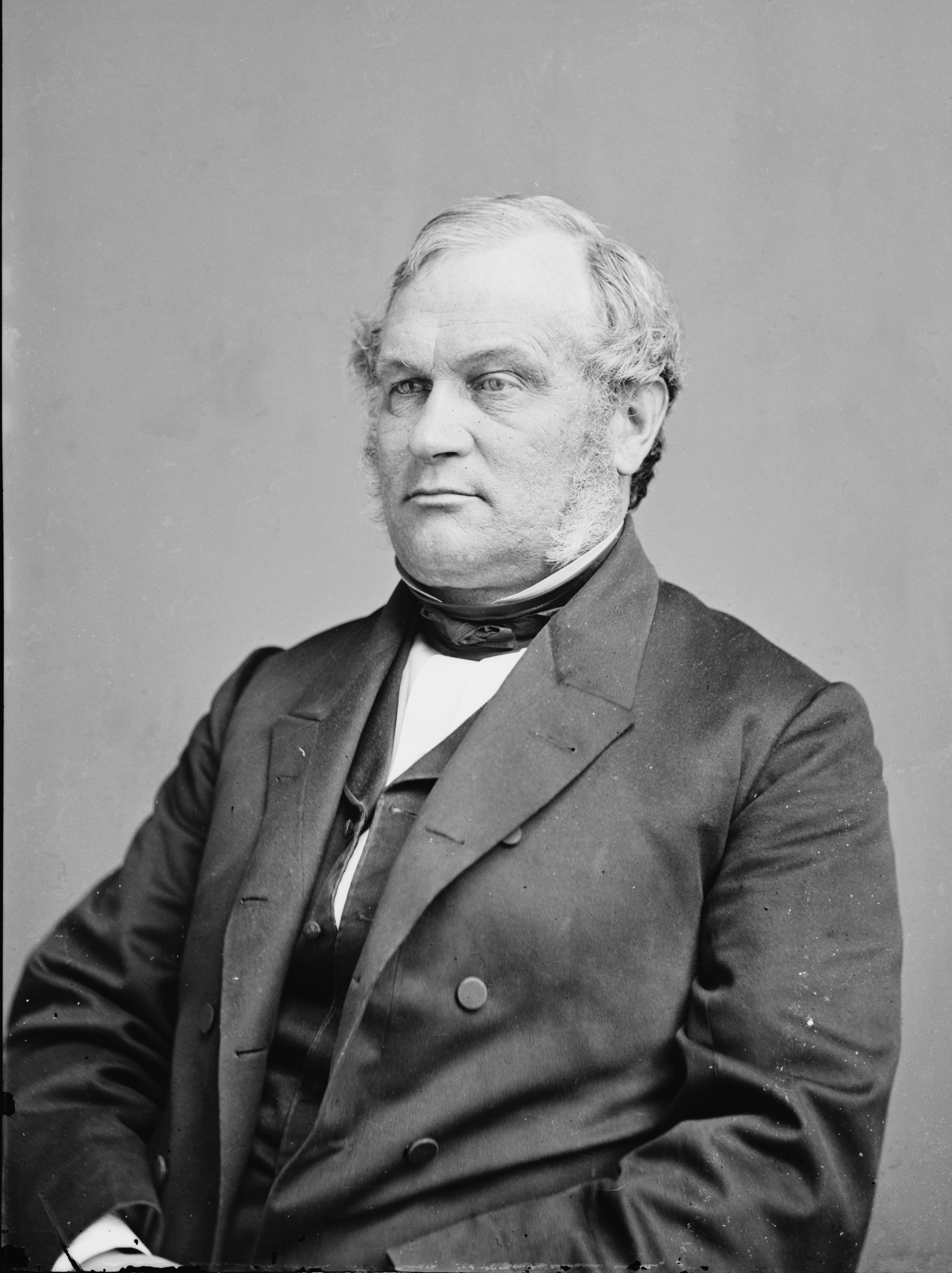

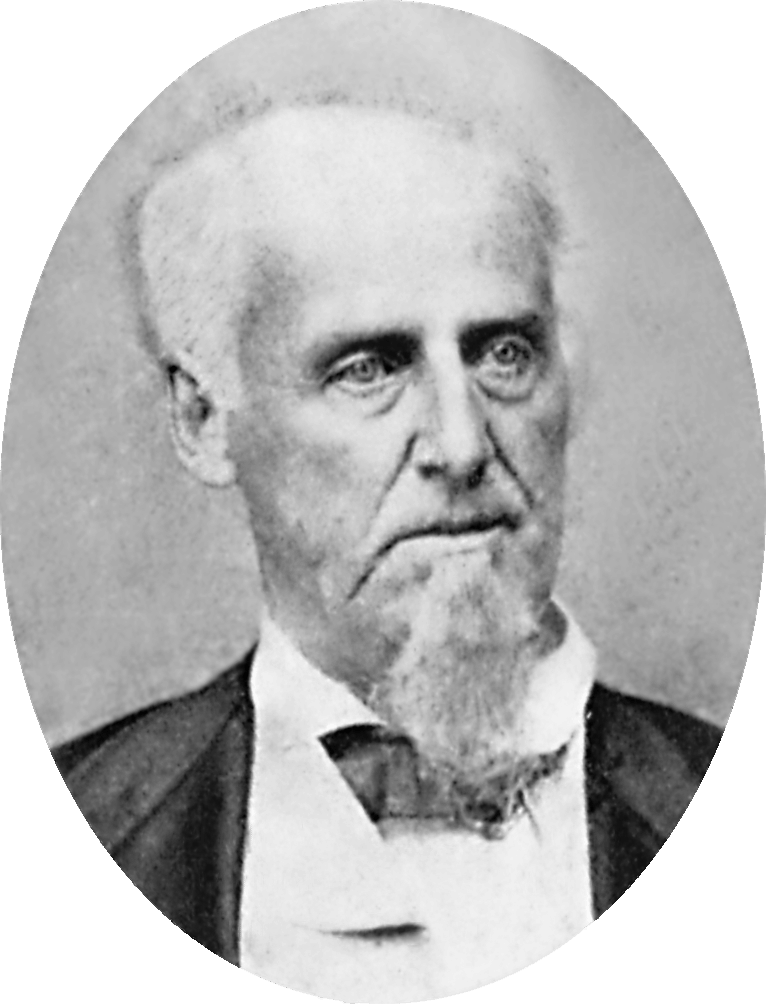
Nominee	Alexander Ramsey	Andrew G. Chatfield
Party	Republican	Democratic
1st ballot	45 (72.6%)	17 (27.4%)
Senator before election
Henry M. Rice
Democratic
Elected Senator
Alexander Ramsey
Republican

One-term Democrat Henry M. Rice was elected in 1858. He was not a candidate for re-election.

The Republican members of the legislature held a caucus from January 12–13, 1863. Alexander Ramsey, Cyrus Aldrich, David Cooper, William Rainey Marshall, and James Smith, Jr. were the major candidates. Ramsey defeated Smith on the 25th ballot.

The Minnesota Legislature met in joint session on January 14, 1863. Ramsey defeated Democratic candidate Andrew G. Chatfield on the first ballot.

== Mississippi ==
Mississippi election
- No election
Senator before election
None (vacant from March 14, 1861)
Elected Senator
None

One-term Democrat Jefferson Davis withdrew from the Senate on March 14, 1861, following the secession of Mississippi. The Mississippi Legislature did not hold an election for the next term, and the seat remained vacant until 1870.

== Missouri ==
Three elections were held in Missouri, due to the expulsions of Trusten Polk and Waldo P. Johnson. With Polk's expulsion coming little more than a year before the end of his term on March 4, 1863, the Missouri General Assembly would hold special elections for both seats, followed by the regularly-scheduled election for the Class 1 seat.

Missouri Unionists were divided in their responses to emancipation and the related issue of Reconstruction. Three main ideological camps emerged: radical Charcoals, who supported immediate emancipation; conservative Claybanks, who favored Lincoln's initial plan of gradual emancipation; and ultra-conservative Snowflakes, who opposed emancipation altogether. In St. Louis, the ideological divide resulted in a formal split between the Immediatist and Gradualist wings of the Emancipation Party. Elections held in the fall of 1862 resulted in a clear majority for the Emancipationists in the General Assembly, while five Conservatives and four Radicals were elected to the U.S. House of Representatives. (Note: The U.S. congressional delegation from Missouri in the 38th Congress included six Emancipationists, (including four Immediate Emancipationists, one Emancipationist, and one Gradual Emancipationist,) two Democrats, and one Conservative Unionist.)

The Emancipation members of the legislature held a caucus on January 3, 1863. The Conservatives boycotted the proceedings. John B. Henderson was nominated for the Class 1 seat and B. Gratz Brown was nominated for the Class 3 seat.

The General Assembly met in joint session on January 6, 1863, to hold concurrent special elections for both seats. Henderson was elected to the Class 1 seat for the term ending March 4. The special election for the Class 3 seat remained deadlocked after multiple rounds of voting, and the joint session adjourned without making a choice.

The joint session reconvened in November 1863. In the interim, the Radicals held a convention at Jefferson City, Missouri, that organized the Radical Union Party. The meeting nominated Brown for the Class 3 seat and Benjamin F. Loan for the Class 1 seat. The Conservatives were united in support of the administration of Hamilton R. Gamble, but lacked a formal party organization. Closely-fought judicial elections in the fall of 1863 helped to clarify party lines. Henderson had campaigned for the Conservative judicial candidates, but was aligned with the Radicals on emancipation and faced a Conservative opponent in his bid for re-election. In the legislature, the Radical Unionists had 65 votes on the joint ballot, just short of an overall majority, while Henderson's allies held the balance of power. The Radical Union members held a caucus after the first round of voting on November 12 and agreed to form a coalition with Henderson's supporters. Brown was subsequently elected to the Class 3 seat and Henderson was re-elected to the Class 1 seat as a Radical Unionist.

=== Missouri (Class 1, special) ===
Missouri (Class 1) special election
- January 6, 1863

Members of the Missouri General Assembly Majority of voting members needed to win
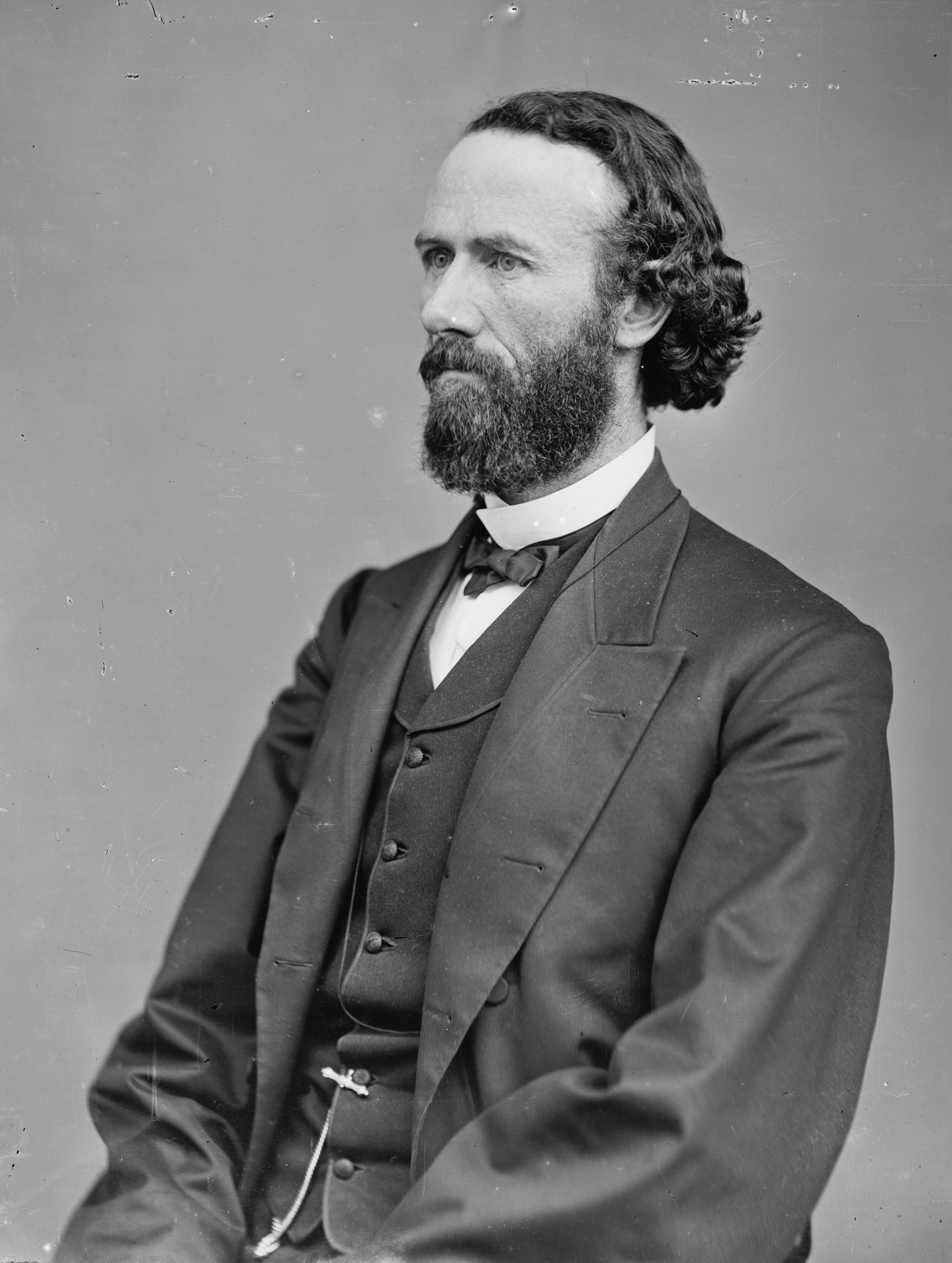

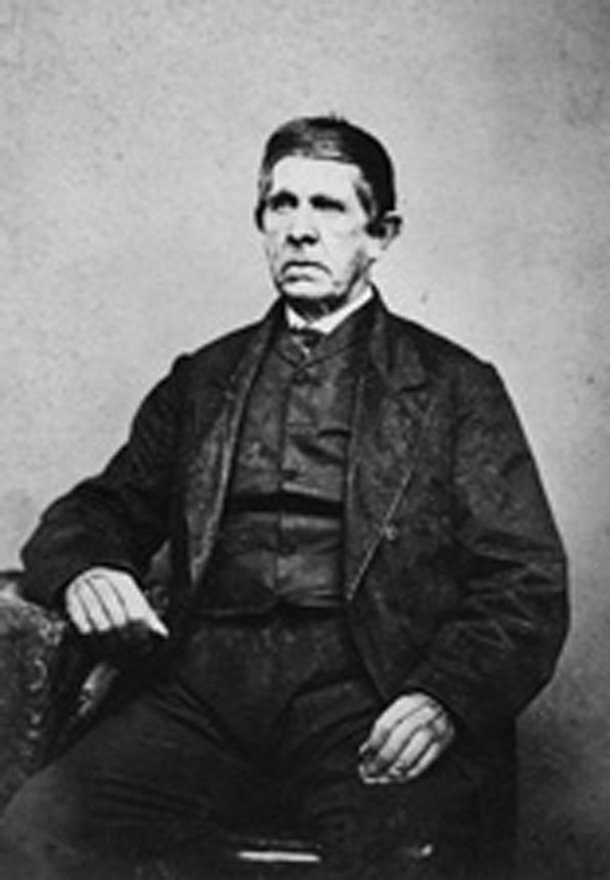
Nominee	John B. Henderson	Robert Wilson
Party	Emancipation	Union
Faction	Conservative	Conservative
1st ballot	104 (68.4%)	47 (30.9%)
Senator before election
John B. Henderson
Emancipation
Elected Senator
John B. Henderson
Emancipation

Incumbent Emancipationist John B. Henderson was appointed in 1862 to fill the vacancy created by the expulsion of Trusten Polk.

The General Assembly met on January 6, 1863, to hold a special election for the unexpired term. Henderson defeated Conservative candidate Robert Wilson on the first ballot.

=== Missouri (Class 3, special) ===
Missouri (Class 3) special election
- First session
- January 6–11, 1863; February 2–11, 1863

Members of the Missouri General Assembly Majority of voting members needed to win
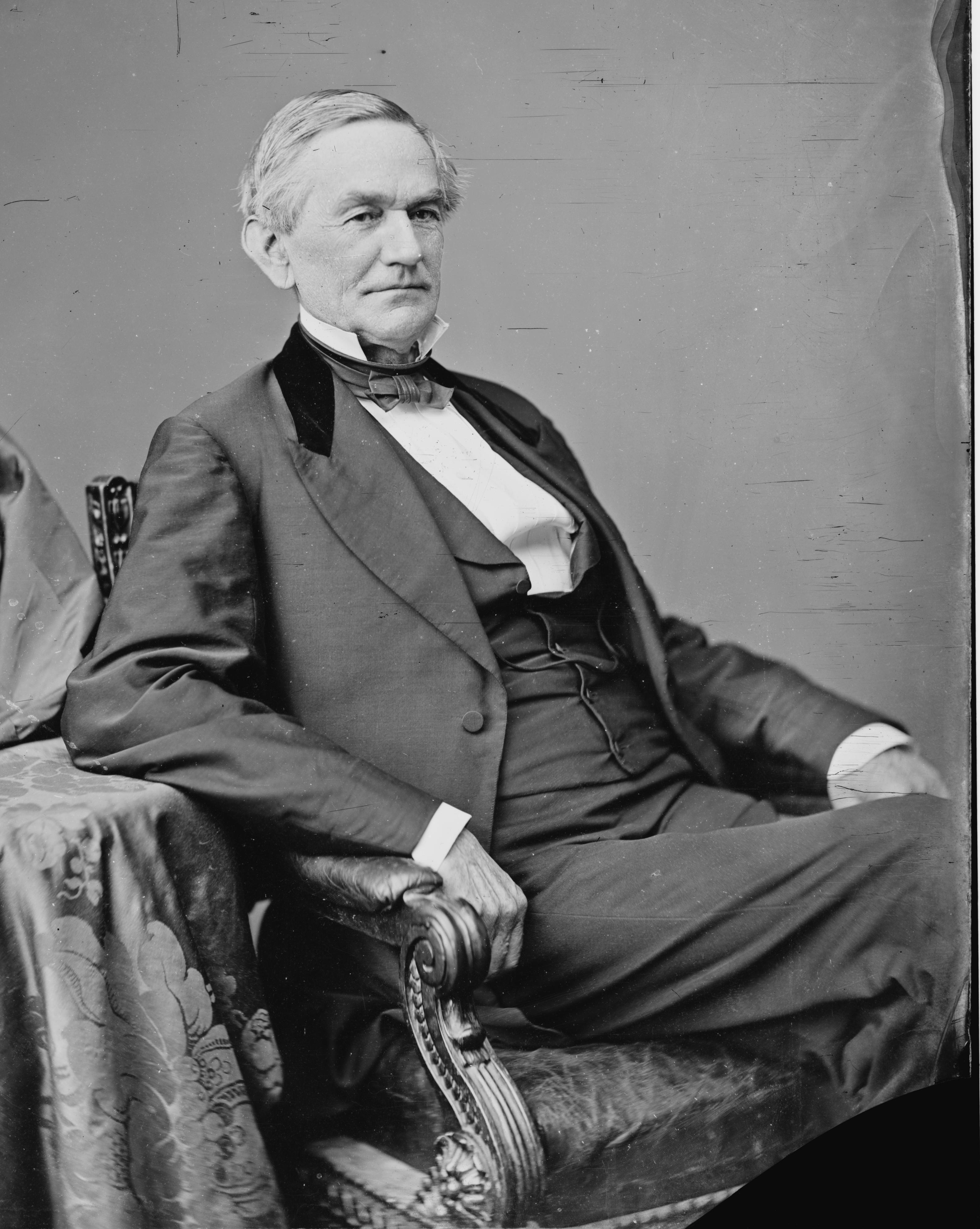

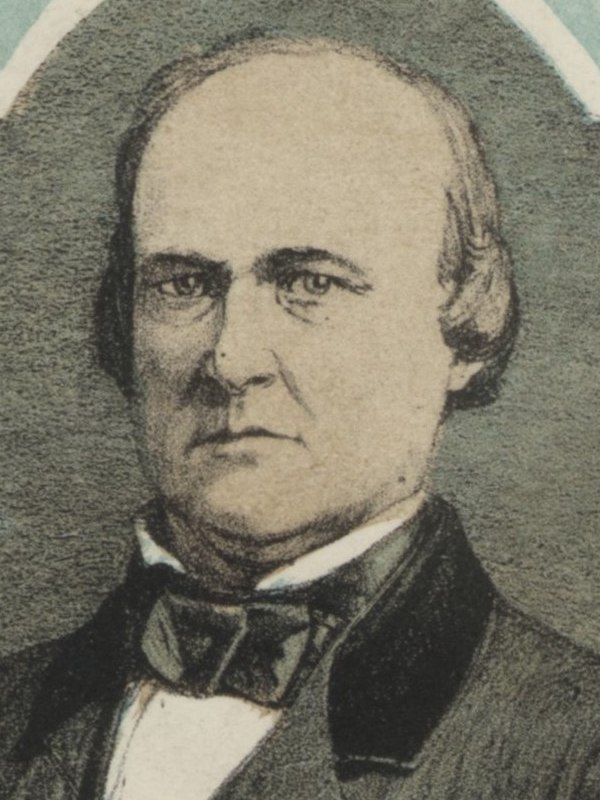

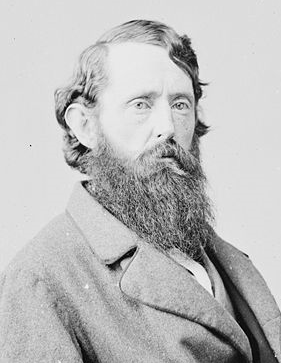

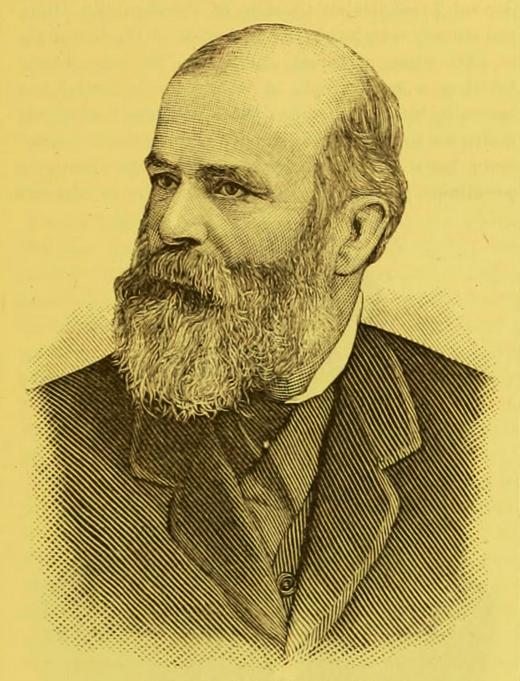

Nominee	John S. Phelps	Robert F. Wingate	B. Gratz Brown
Party	Democratic	Emancipation	Emancipation
Faction	Conservative	Radical	Radical
1st ballot	51 (33.1%)	—	51 (33.1%)
30th ballot	47 (33.3%)	31 (22.0%)	29 (20.6%)
Nominee	Samuel M. Breckinridge	Samuel T. Glover
Party	Emancipation	Emancipation
Faction	Conservative	Conservative
1st ballot	11 (7.1%)	34 (22.1%)
30th ballot	28 (19.8%)	—
- Adjourned session
- November 12–13, 1863

Members of the Missouri General Assembly Majority of voting members needed to win
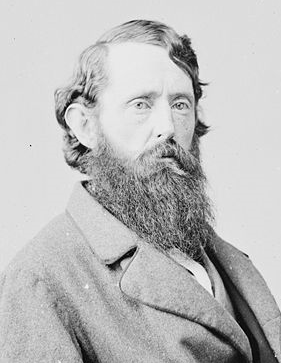

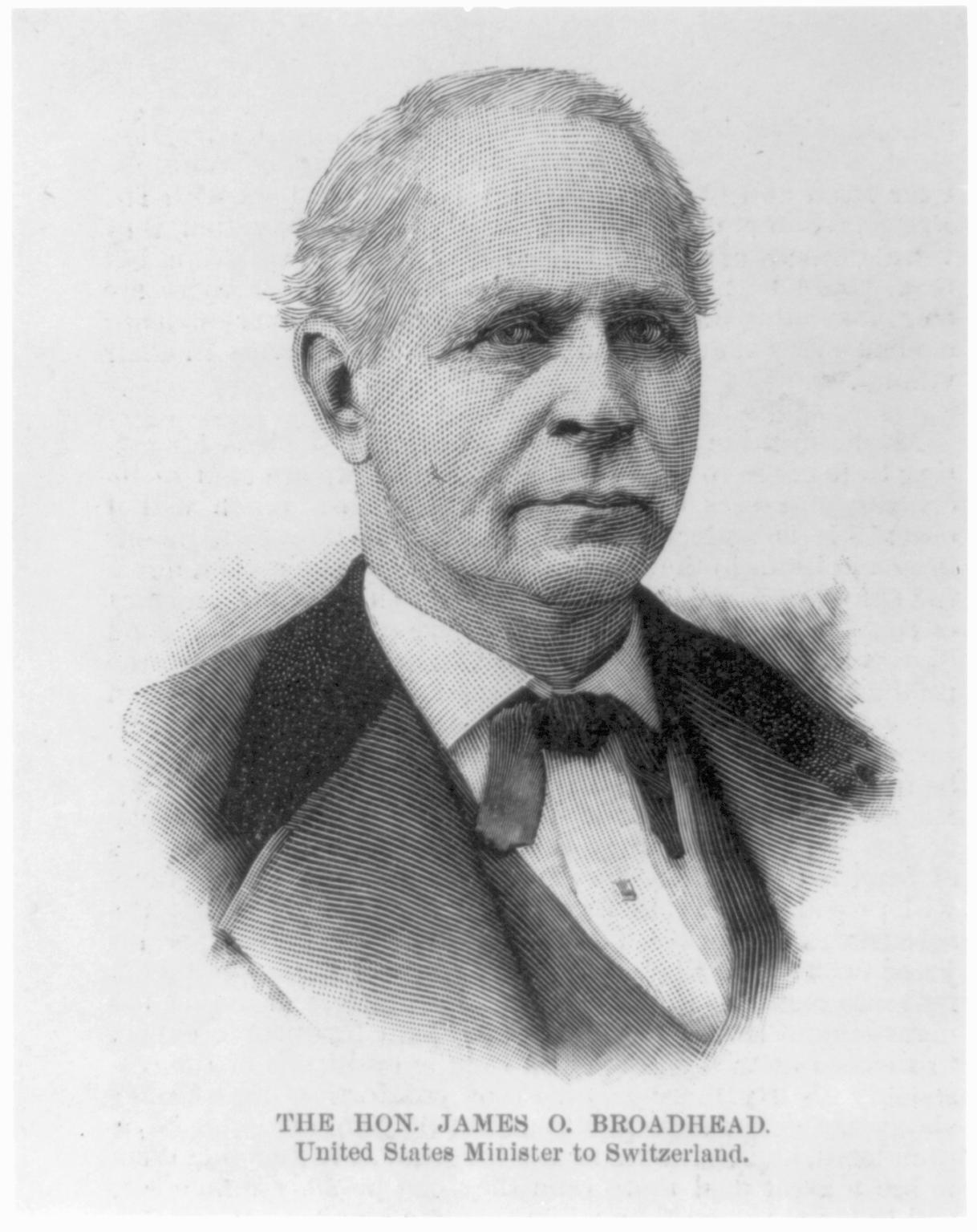

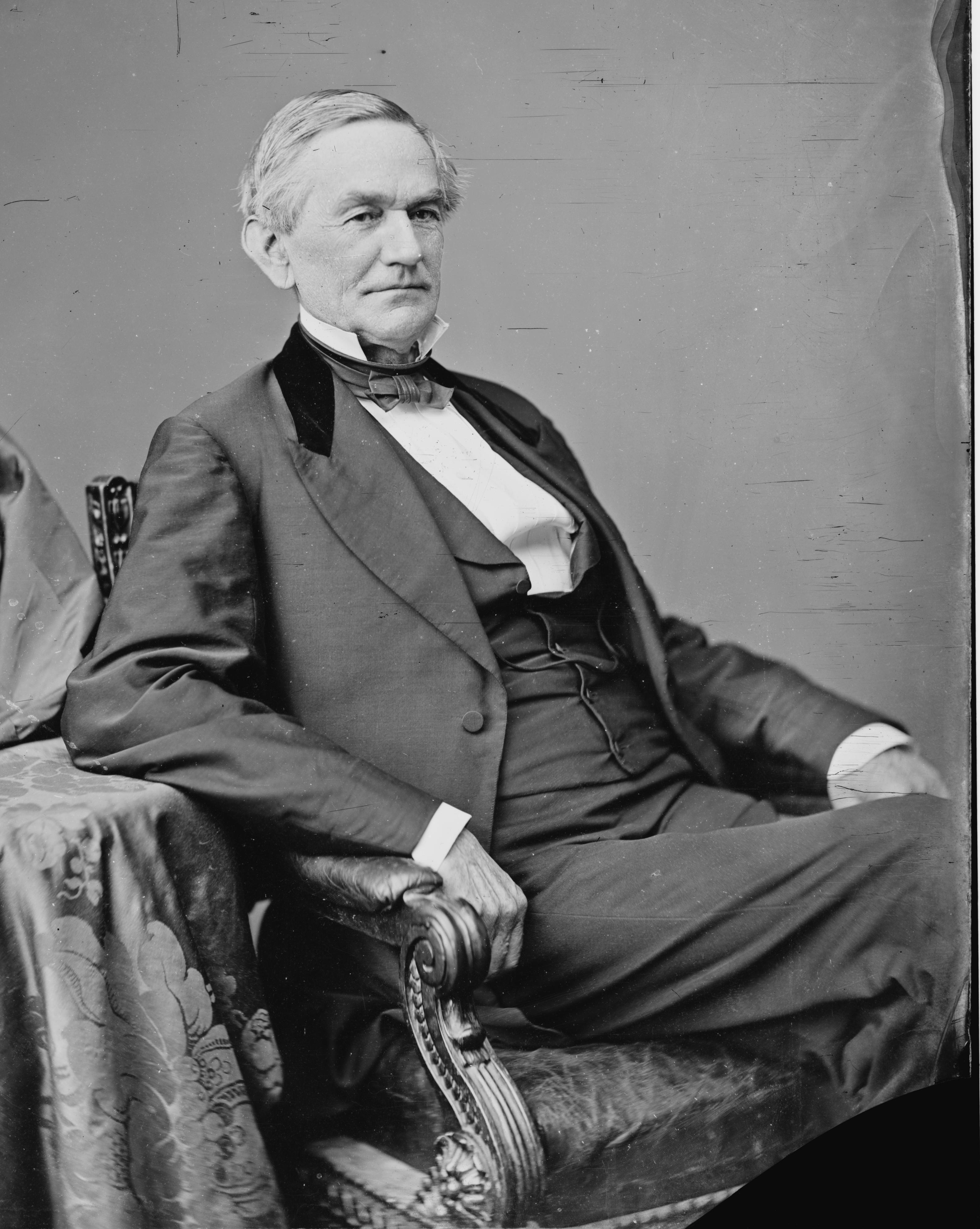
Nominee	B. Gratz Brown	James Broadhead	John S. Phelps
Party	Radical	Conservative	Conservative
31st ballot	62 (50.0%)	39 (29.5%)	30 (22.7%)
32nd ballot	74 (52.5%)	65 (46.1%)	—
Senator before election
Robert Wilson
Conservative
Elected Senator
B. Gratz Brown
Radical

Incumbent Conservative Robert Wilson was appointed in 1862 to fill the vacancy created by the expulsion of Waldo P. Johnson. He was not a candidate for re-election to the Class 3 seat.

The General Assembly met from January 6–11, 1863, to hold a special election for the unexpired term. Democrat John S. Phelps and Emancipationists B. Gratz Brown, Samuel T. Glover, Samuel M. Breckinridge, John W. Noell, and James Broadhead were candidates on the first ballot. No candidate had a majority after the sixth ballot, and the joint session adjourned.

The joint session met again from February 2–11, 1863. Phelps, Brown, Glover, Breckinridge, and Broadhead were candidates. Noell's name was withdrawn, after which Phelps led on the seventh ballot, but without a majority. No candidate had a majority after the thirtieth ballot, and the joint session adjourned.

The joint session met a third time from November 12–13, 1863. Brown was nominated by the Radical Unionists, while Broadhead received the votes of most of the Conservative members. Brown defeated Broadhead on the 32nd ballot.

=== Missouri (regular) ===
Missouri election
- November 13, 1863

Members of the Missouri General Assembly Majority of voting members needed to win
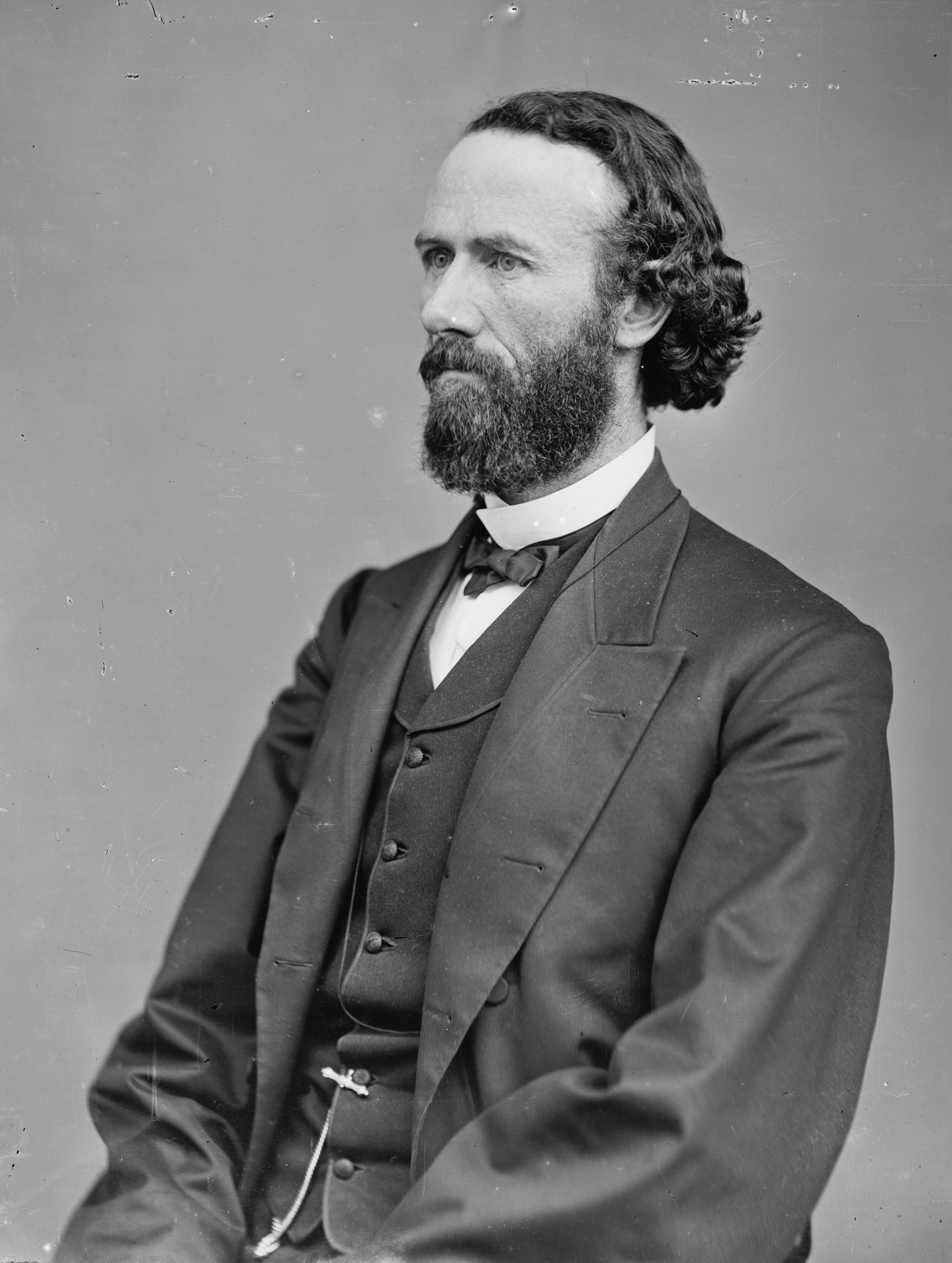

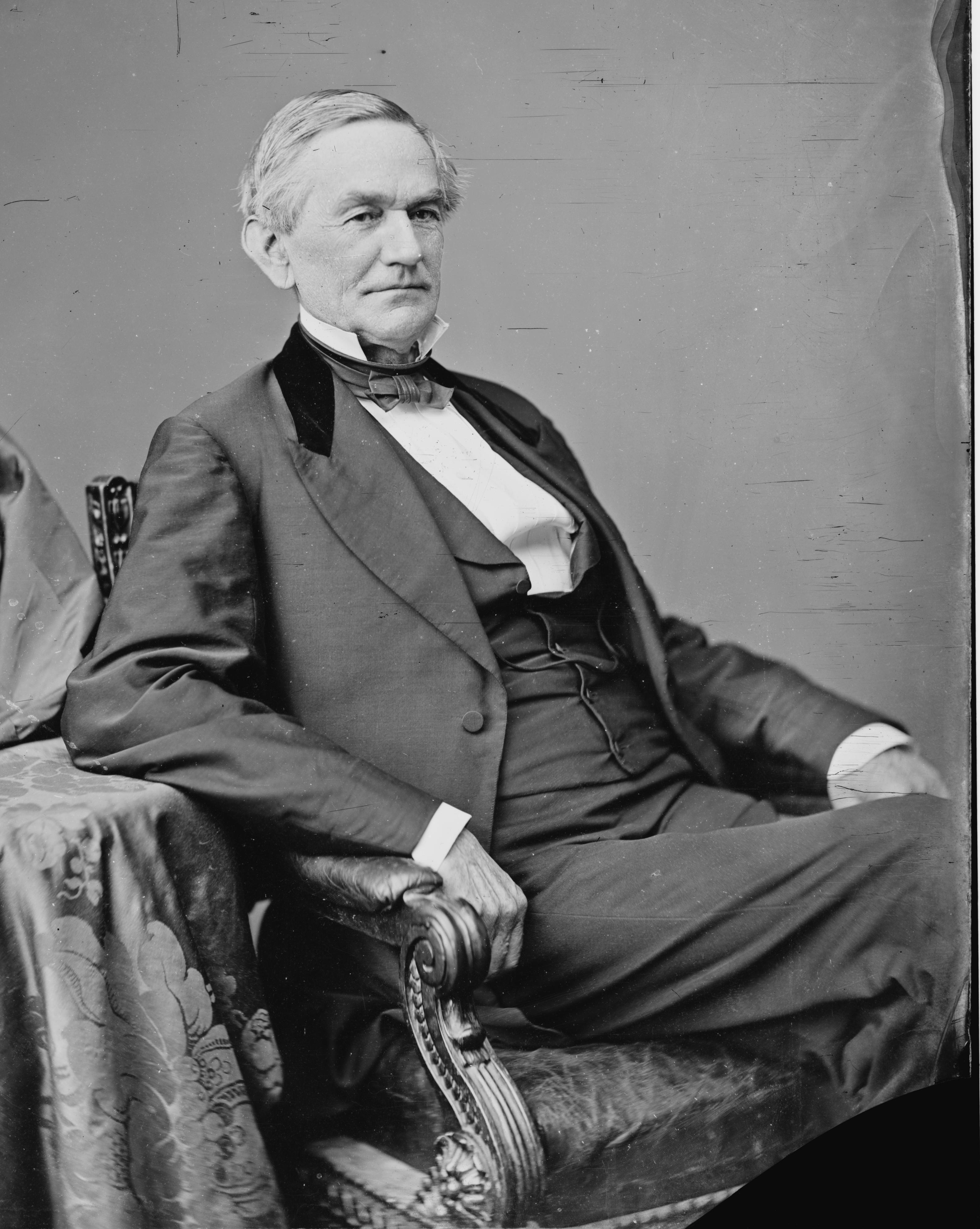

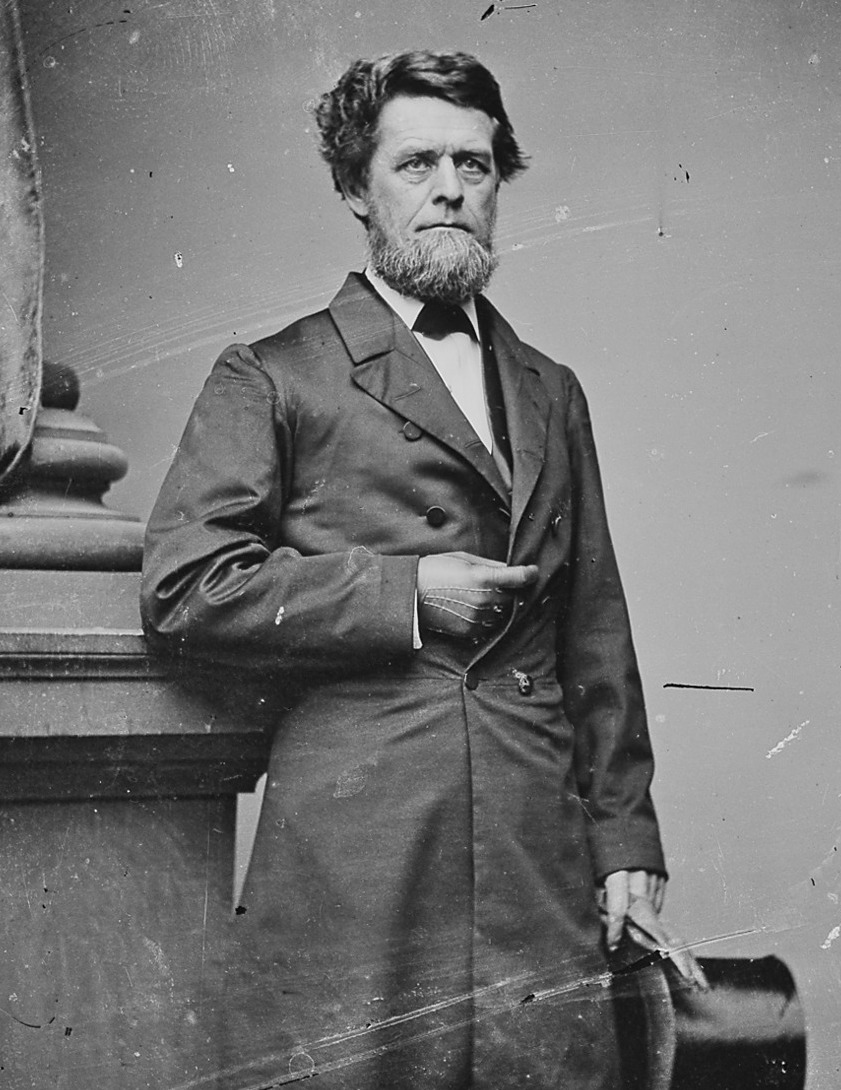
Nominee	John B. Henderson	John S. Phelps	Benjamin F. Loan
Party	Radical	Conservative	Radical
1st ballot	84 (60.9%)	42 (30.4%)	7 (5.1%)
Senator before election
John B. Henderson
Emancipation
Elected Senator
John B. Henderson
Radical

Incumbent Emancipationist John B. Henderson was elected in 1863 to fill the vacancy created by the expulsion of Trusten Polk.

The General Assembly met on November 13, 1863, to hold an election for the next term. Henderson defeated Phelps on the first ballot.

== New Jersey ==
Incumbent Unionist Richard S. Field was appointed in 1862 to fill the vacancy created by the death of John R. Thomson. With Thomson's death coming less than a year before the end of his term on March 4, 1863, the New Jersey Legislature would hold consecutive elections in 1863: a special election for the unexpired term, and the regularly scheduled election for the next term.

=== New Jersey (special) ===
New Jersey special election
- January 14, 1863

Members of the New Jersey Legislature Majority of voting members needed to win
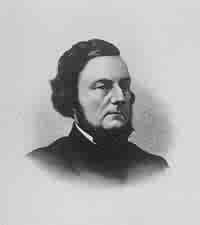

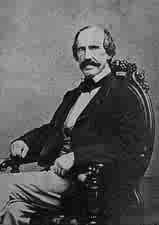
Nominee	James Walter Wall	Richard Stockton Field
Party	Democratic	Union
1st ballot	53 (67.1%)	23 (29.1%)
Senator before election
Richard Stockton Field
Union
Elected Senator
James Walter Wall
Democratic

The Democratic members of the legislature held a caucus on January 14, 1863. William Cook, Charles Skelton, Charles Sitgreaves, and James Walter Wall were candidates. Cook led on the first two ballots, but without a majority. Skelton and Sitgreaves then withdrew, and Wall defeated Cook on the third ballot.

The Legislature met in joint session on January 14, 1863, to hold a special election for the unexpired term. Wall defeated Field on the first ballot.

=== New Jersey (regular) ===
New Jersey election
- February 26, 1863

Members of the New Jersey Legislature Majority of voting members needed to win
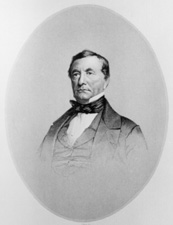

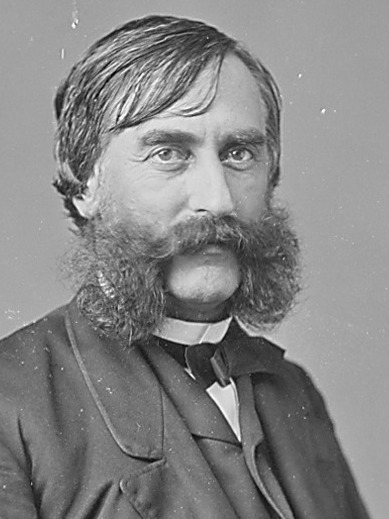
Nominee	William Wright	William A. Newell
Party	Democratic	Union
1st ballot	54 (68.4%)	25 (31.6%)
Senator before election
James Walter Wall
Democratic
Elected Senator
William Wright
Democratic

The Democratic members of the legislature held a caucus on February 25, 1863. Wall and William Wright were candidates. Wright was nominated on the 23rd ballot.

The Legislature met in joint session on February 26, 1863, to hold an election for the next term. Wright defeated Union candidate William A. Newell on the first ballot.

== New York ==
New York election
- February 3, 1863

Members of the New York State Legislature Majority of voting members needed to win
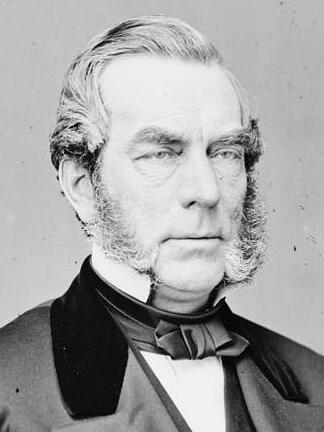

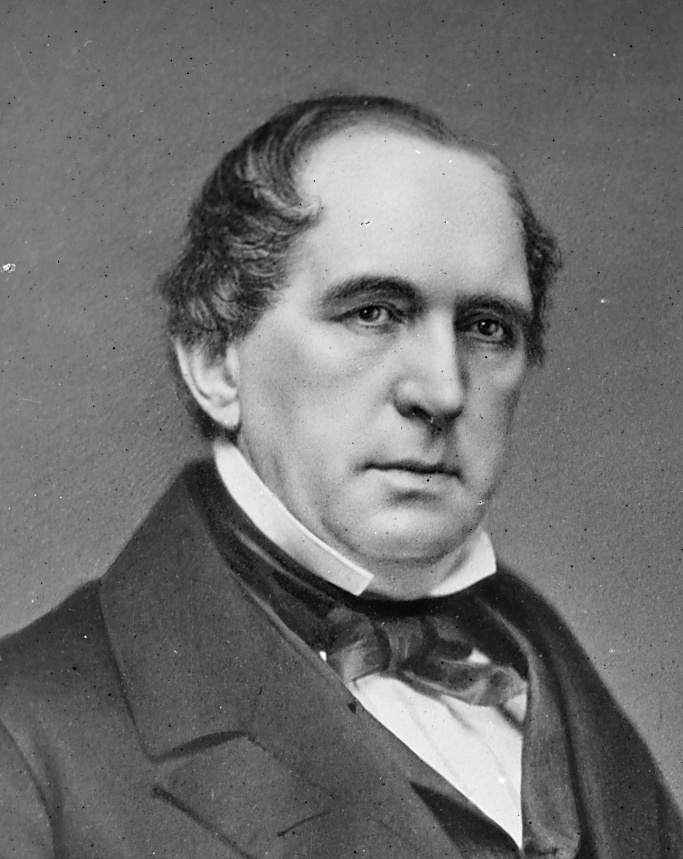

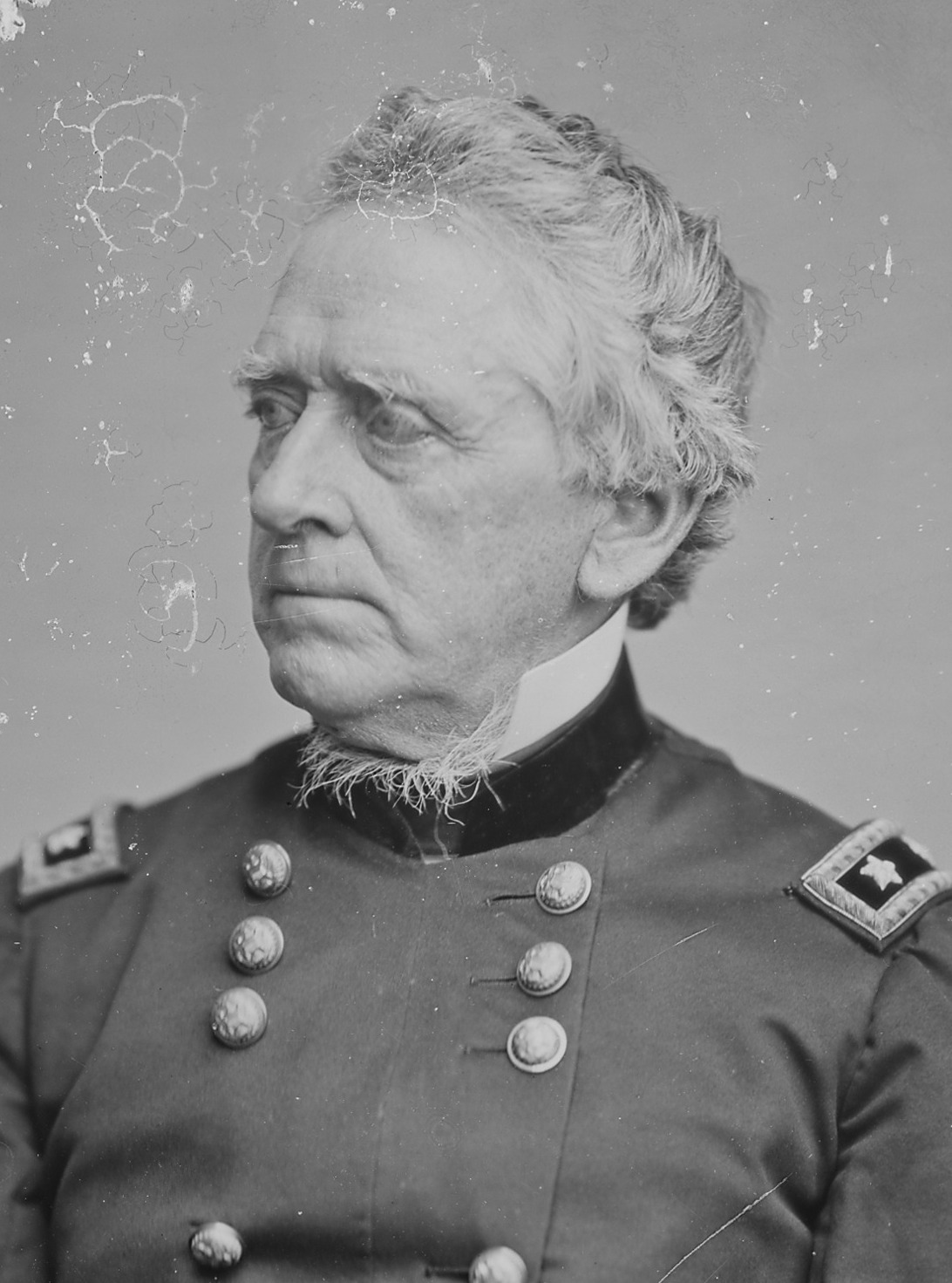
Nominee	Edwin D. Morgan	Erastus Corning	John Adams Dix
Party	Union	Democratic	Union
Assembly (2nd)	—	63 (49.2%)	65 (50.8%)
Senate (1st)	23 (76.7%)	7 (23.3%)	—
Joint ballot	86 (54.4%)	70 (44.3%)	1 (0.6%)
Senator before election
Preston King
Republican
Elected Senator
Edwin D. Morgan
Union

One-term Republican Preston King was elected in 1857.

Democrat Horatio Seymour won the 1862 New York gubernatorial election, but Unionists retained a narrow majority in the New York State Legislature following the 1862 New York state elections. The Democratic ticket was endorsed by the Constitutional Union state convention in a bid to unite conservative, anti-abolitionist opponents of the Union state administration. Democrats framed the election as a referendum on white supremacy; one Democratic congressional candidate remarked that "the negation of the white race and the elevation of the negro over the white man have hushed up or exiled all our past political differences." The failure of prominent conservative Republicans to support the Union candidate for governor contributed to the Democratic victory in the gubernatorial race.

The Union members of the legislature held a caucus on February 2, 1863. Edwin D. Morgan, King, Daniel S. Dickinson, Charles B. Sedgwick, David Dudley Field II, Henry Jarvis Raymond, Ward Hunt, and Henry R. Selden were candidates. Morgan was nominated on the second ballot.

The Democratic members of the legislature held a caucus on February 2, 1863. The meeting found it inexpedient to nominate a candidate and advised members to vote their conscience in the senatorial election. The caucus met again on February 3 and voted to reconsider the previous day's motion. Erastus Corning defeated Fernando Wood on the first ballot.

The Senate and the Assembly met separately on February 3, 1863, to hold an election for the next term. Morgan and John Adams Dix were selected by the Senate and the Assembly, on the first and second ballots, respectively. The two chambers being in disagreement, the New York State Legislature met in joint session to resolve the dispute. Morgan defeated Corning on the joint ballot.

== Ohio ==
Ohio election
- January 22, 1863

Members of the Ohio General Assembly Majority of voting members needed to win
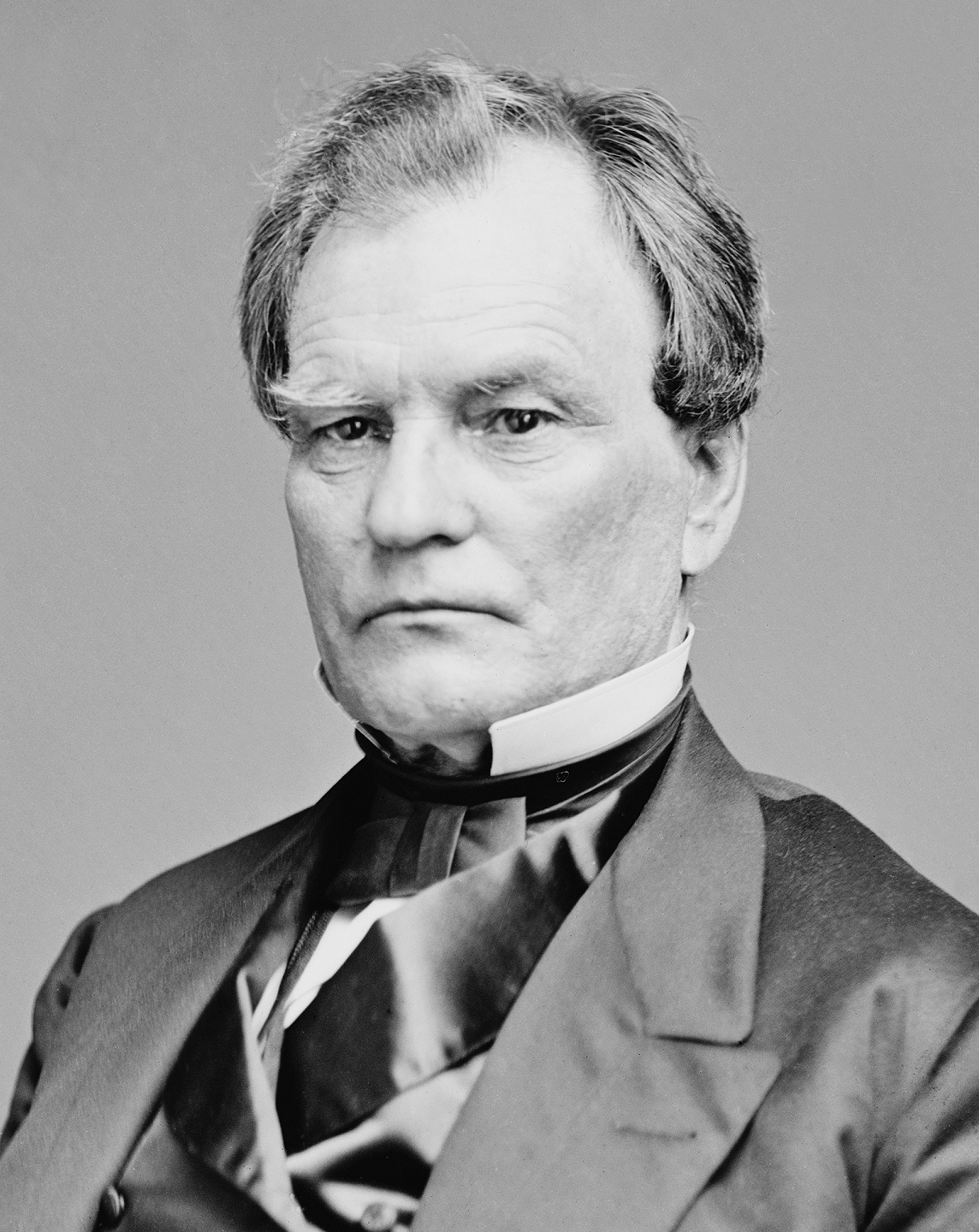

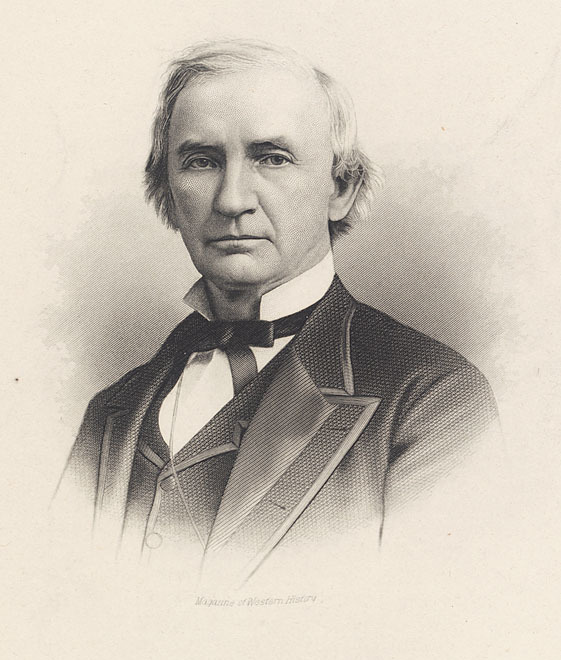

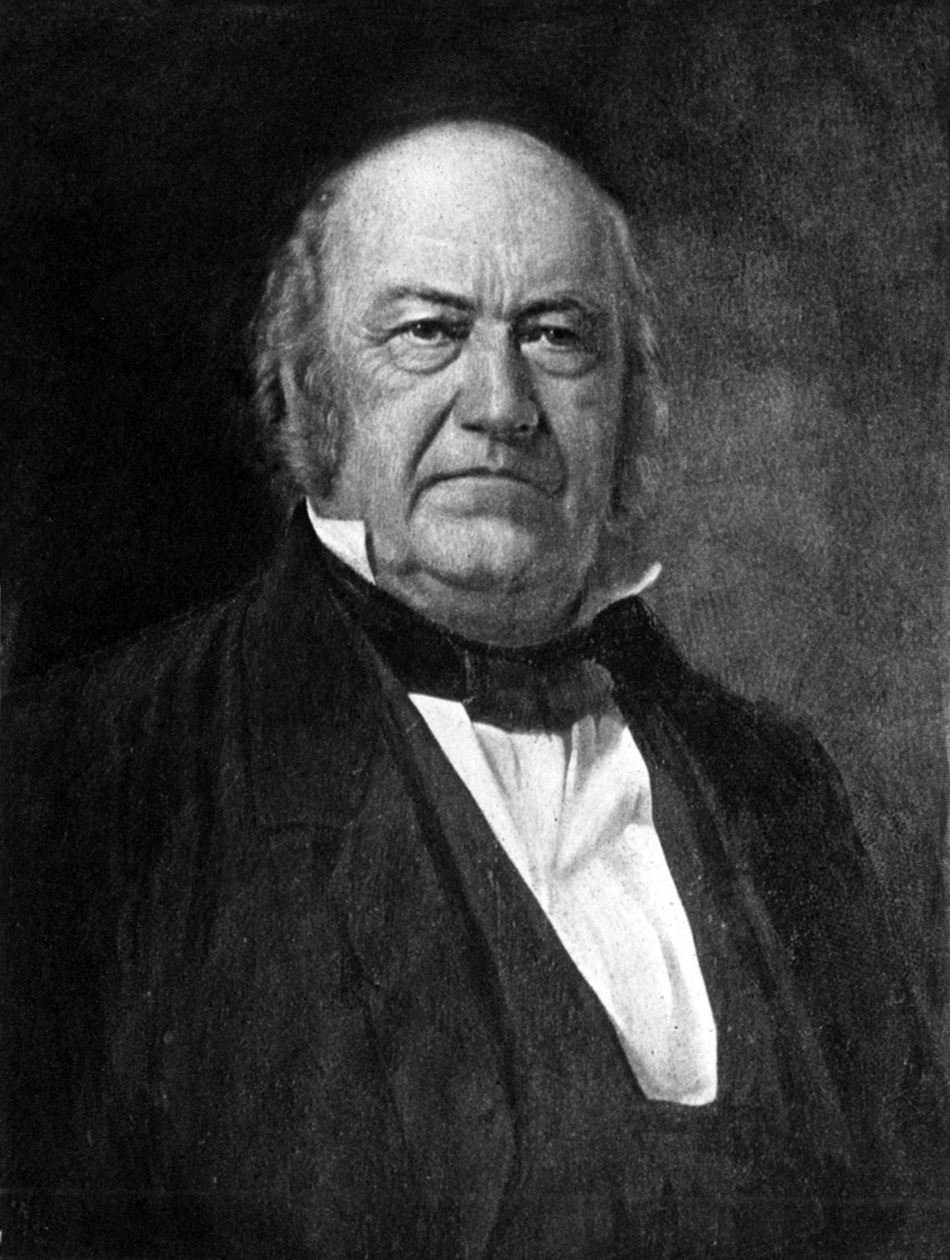
Nominee	Benjamin Wade	Hugh J. Jewett	Thomas Ewing
Party	Union	Democratic	Union
1st ballot	126 (59.5%)	35 (27.8%)	15 (11.9%)
Senator before election
Benjamin Wade
Union
Elected Senator
Benjamin Wade
Union

Two-term Unionist Benjamin Wade was re-elected in 1856.

Wade, a radical Republican, was opposed by War Democrats in the Union Party, who made plans to support a conservative challenger in the Union senatorial caucus. Several candidates from the conservative wing of the party emerged, including William S. Groesbeck, Thomas Ewing, and Columbus Delano. Wade also faced a potential challenge from U.S. treasury secretary Salmon P. Chase, who hoped that a triumphant return to the Senate could improve his chances of winning the Union presidential nomination in 1864.

A first attempt to hold a caucus ended in failure, and the body adjourned in March 1862 without naming a nominee. In the following months, Wade secured a series of political victories, successfully pressuring Lincoln to issue the Emancipation Proclamation and to dismiss the War Democratic commanding general of the Army of the Potomac, George B. McClellan. He was influential in helping to pass the Homestead Act of 1862, a priority long obstructed by proslavery administrations. When Chase bowed out of the race in early 1863, Wade's re-election seemed assured.

The Union members of the legislature held a second caucus from January 15–16, 1863. On the first day of the caucus, a group of War Democrats attempted unsuccessfully to force Wade's withdrawal from the race. The meeting adjourned until the following day, when Wade defeated Robert C. Schenck on the first ballot with 56 votes to Schenck's six.

The Ohio General Assembly met in joint session on January 22, 1863, to hold an election for the next term. Wade defeated Democratic candidate Hugh J. Jewett and Ewing on the first ballot.

== Oregon (special) ==
Oregon special election
- September 11–12, 1863

Members of the Oregon Legislative Assembly Majority of voting members needed to win
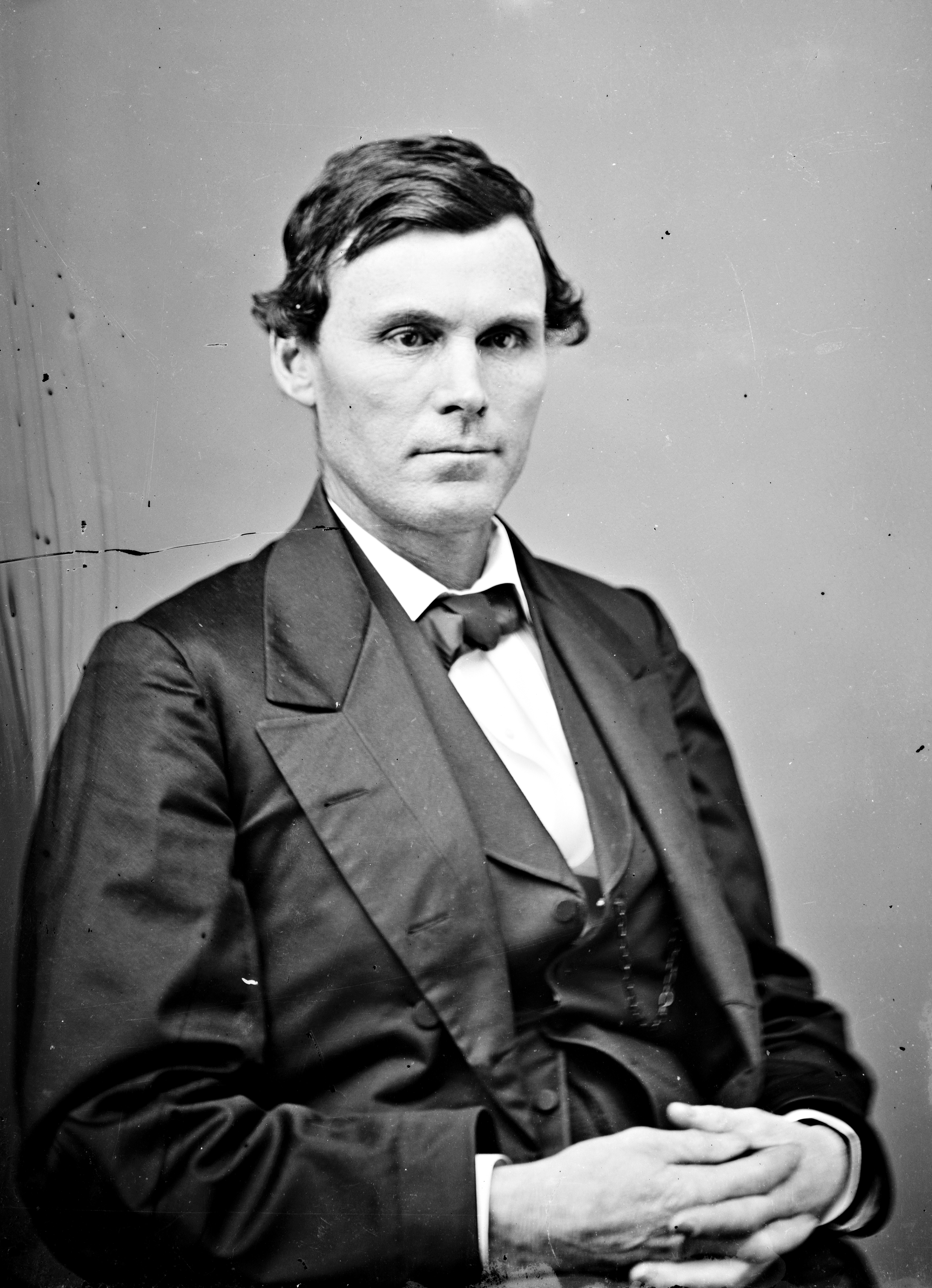

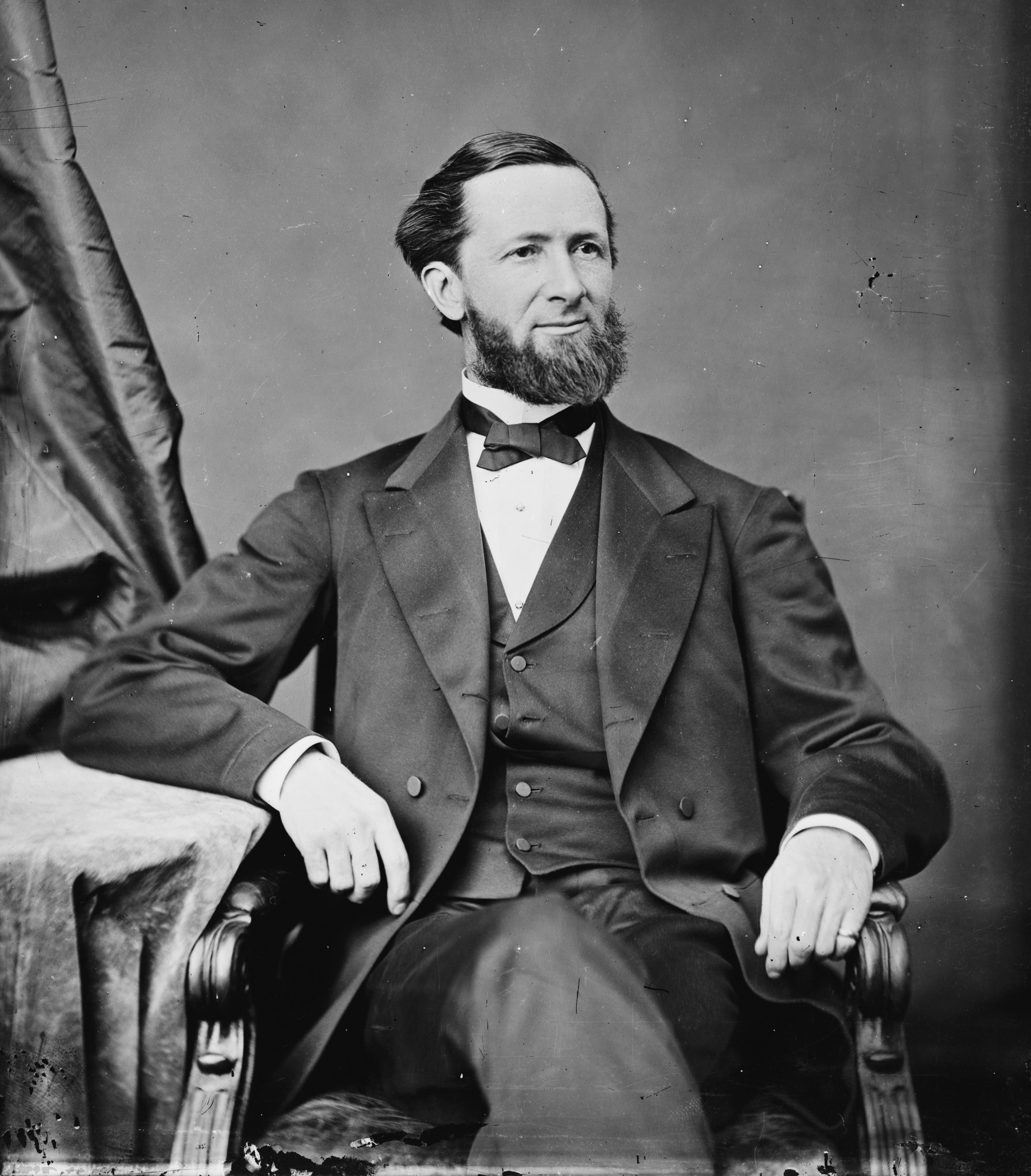

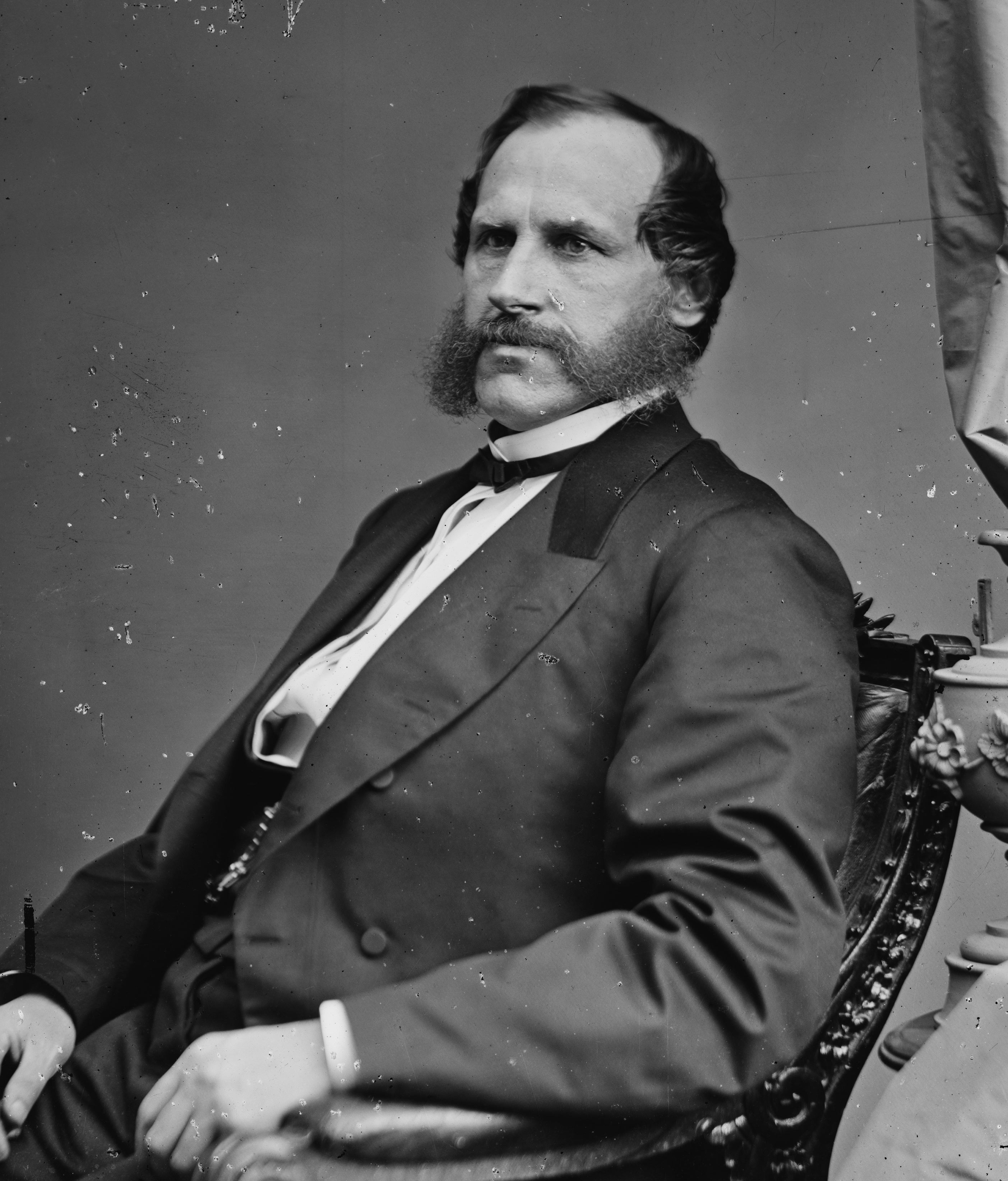

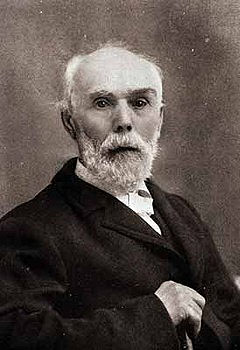

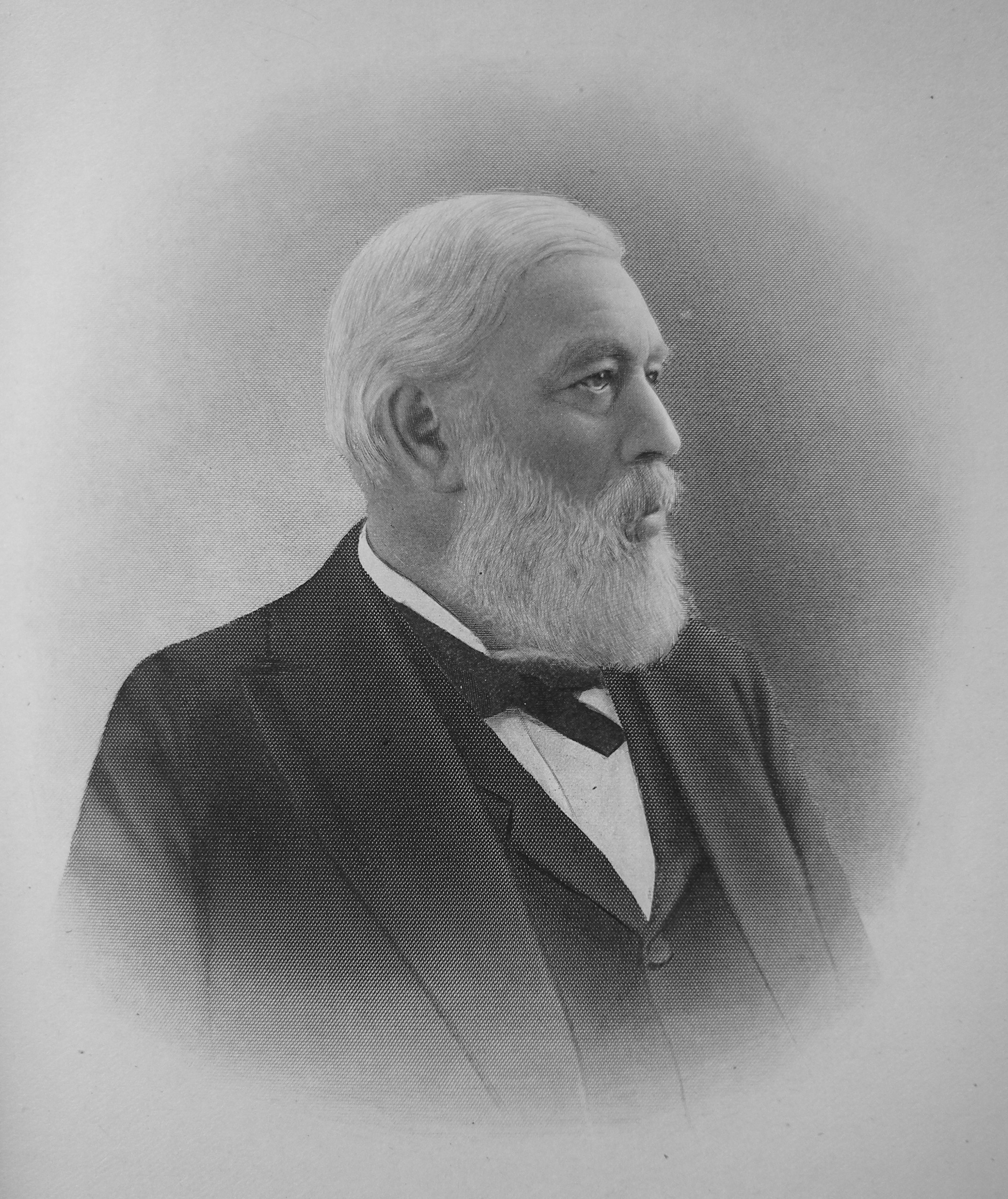

Nominee	Benjamin F. Harding	Henry W. Corbett	George Henry Williams
Party	Union	Union	Union
Faction	War Democrat	Republican	War Democrat
1st ballot	7 (14.6%)	—	7 (14.6%)
30th ballot	28 (58.3%)	11 (22.9%)	5 (10.4%)
Nominee	John Whiteaker	Thomas H. Pearne	Elisha L. Applegate
Party	Democratic	Union	Union
Faction	Peace Democrat	Republican	Republican
1st ballot	3 (6.25%)	9 (18.8%)	8 (16.7%)
30th ballot	3 (6.25%)	—	—
Nominee	Orange Jacobs	Reuben F. Maury
Party	Union	Union
Faction	Republican
1st ballot	5 (10.4%)	4 (8.3%)
30th ballot	—	—
Senator before election
Benjamin Stark
Democratic
Elected Senator
Benjamin F. Harding
Union

Incumbent Democrat Benjamin Stark was appointed in 1862 to fill the vacancy created by the death of Edward D. Baker. He was not a candidate for re-election.

The Oregon Legislative Assembly met in joint session from September 11–12, 1862, to hold a special election for the unexpired term. With the Union Party in almost complete control of the legislature, the contest centered between the Republican and War Democrat wings of the coalition. Benjamin F. Harding defeated Henry W. Corbett, George Henry Williams, and John Whiteaker on the 30th ballot.

== Pennsylvania ==
Pennsylvania election
- January 13, 1863

Members of the Pennsylvania General Assembly Majority of voting members needed to win
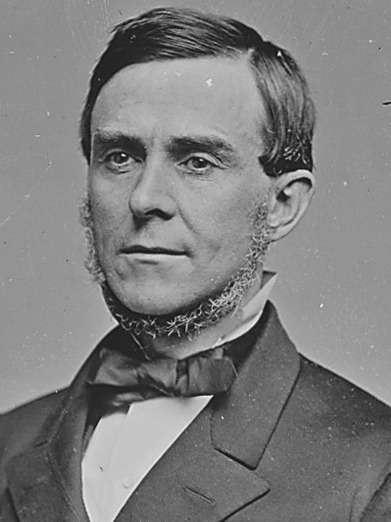

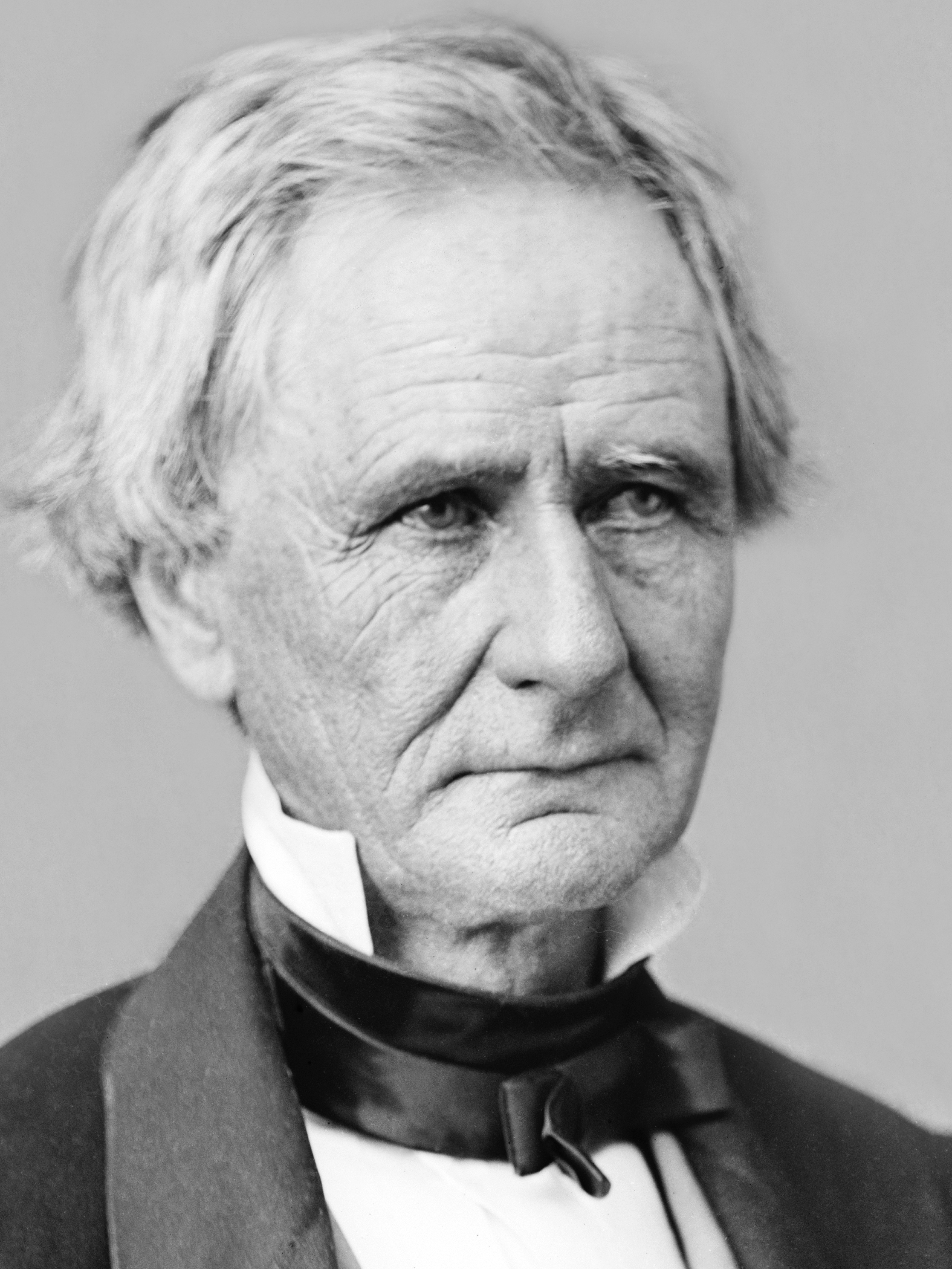
Nominee	Charles R. Buckalew	Simon Cameron
Party	Democratic	Union
1st ballot	67 (50.4%)	65 (48.9%)
Senator before election
David Wilmot
Republican
Elected Senator
Charles R. Buckalew
Democratic

Incumbent Republican David Wilmot was elected in 1861 to fill the vacancy created by the resignation of Simon Cameron.

The Democratic members of the legislature held a caucus on January 12, 1863. Charles R. Buckalew, James Campbell, Francis Wade Hughes, and Henry Donnel Foster were the leading candidates. Buckalew defeated Campbell on the sixth ballot.

The Union members of the legislature held a caucus from January 12–13, 1863. Cameron and Wilmot were candidates for the nomination. A secret committee formed to assess the relative electability of the candidates in the closely-divided legislature found that the Democratic members were inflexibly opposed to Wilmot, while Cameron claimed several Democrats were prepared to vote for him if nominated. The caucus selected Cameron on the basis of these assurances in the final hours before the election.

The Pennsylvania General Assembly met in joint session on January 13, 1863, to hold an election for the next term. Buckalew defeated Cameron on the first ballot.

== Rhode Island ==
There were two elections in Rhode Island, due to the resignation of James F. Simmons.

=== Rhode Island (regular) ===
Rhode Island election
- May 28, 1862

Members of the Rhode Island General Assembly Majority of voting members needed to win
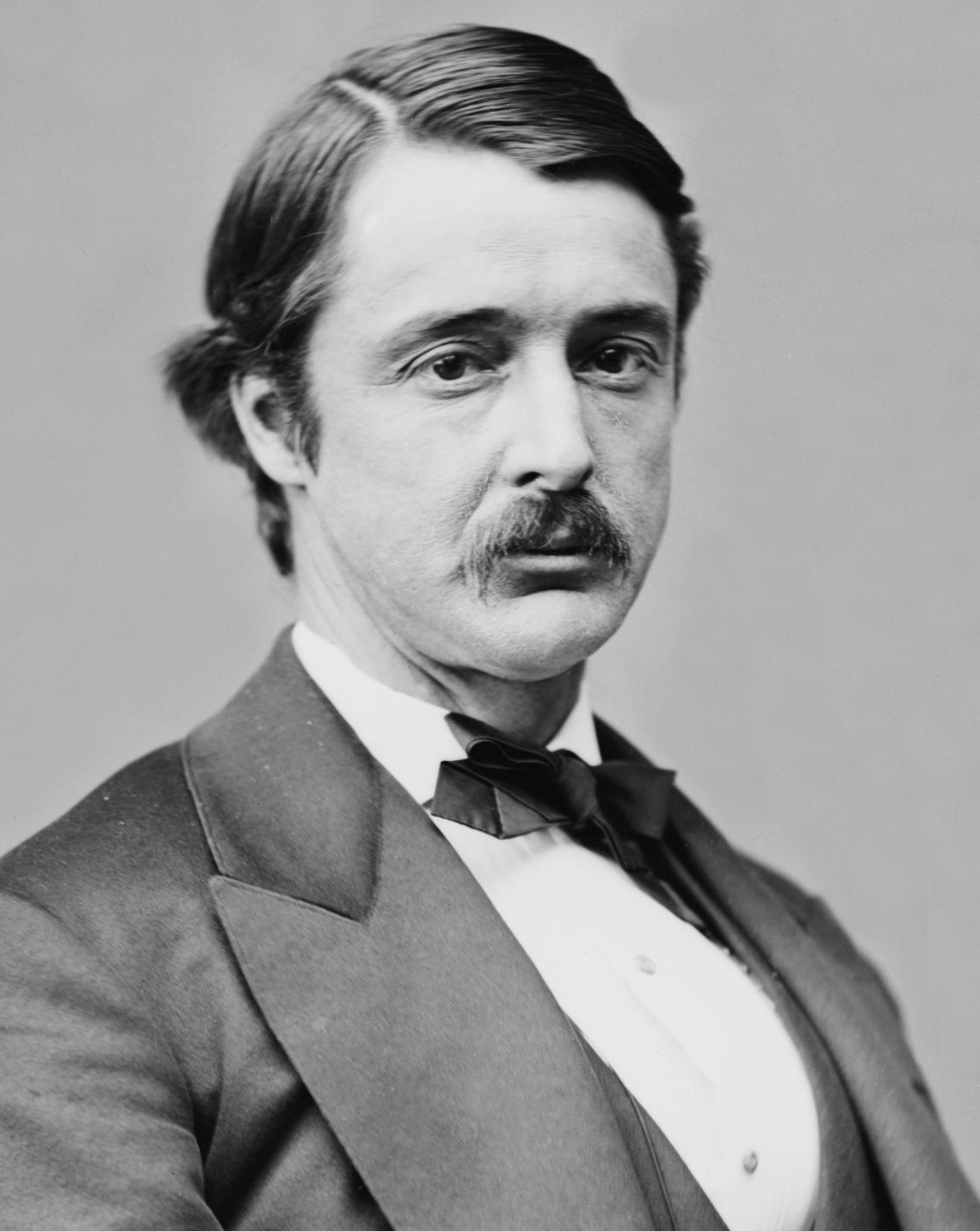

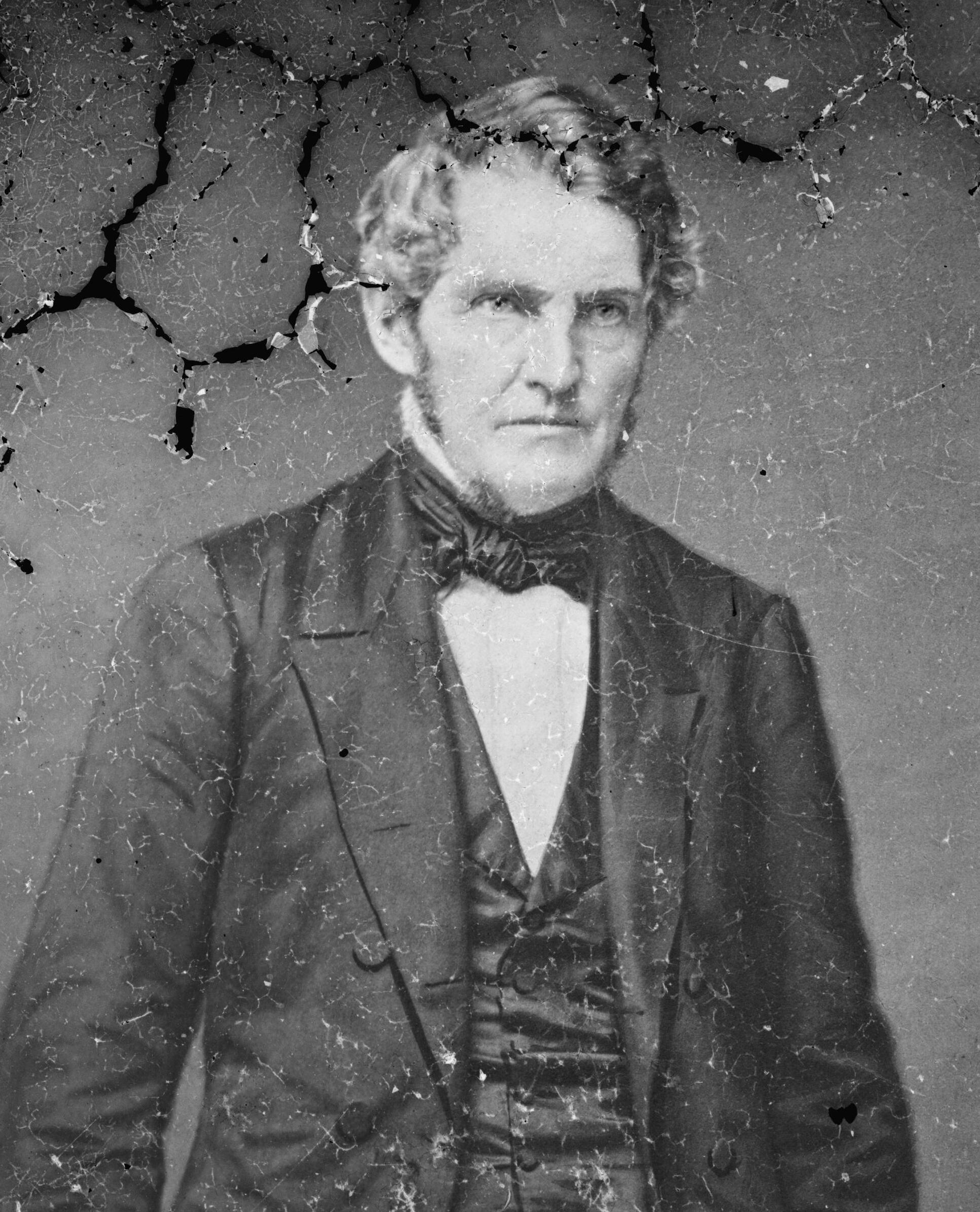

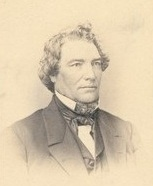
Nominee	William Sprague IV	James F. Simmons	Nathan F. Dixon II
Party	Constitutional Union	Republican	Republican
Alliance	Democratic	—	—
1st ballot	90 (89.3%)	5 (4.8%)	5 (4.8%)
Senator before election
James F. Simmons
Republican
Elected Senator
William Sprague IV
Constitutional Union

Two-term Republican James F. Simmons was re-elected non-consecutively in 1857.

The Rhode Island General Assembly met in joint session on May 28, 1862, to hold an election for the next term. Democratic–Constitutional Union candidate William Sprague IV defeated Simmons and Nathan F. Dixon II on the first ballot. Sprague subsequently caucused with the Republican–Union majority in the Senate and served the remainder of his term as a Republican.

=== Rhode Island (special) ===
Rhode Island special election
- September 5, 1862

Members of the Rhode Island General Assembly Majority of voting members needed to win
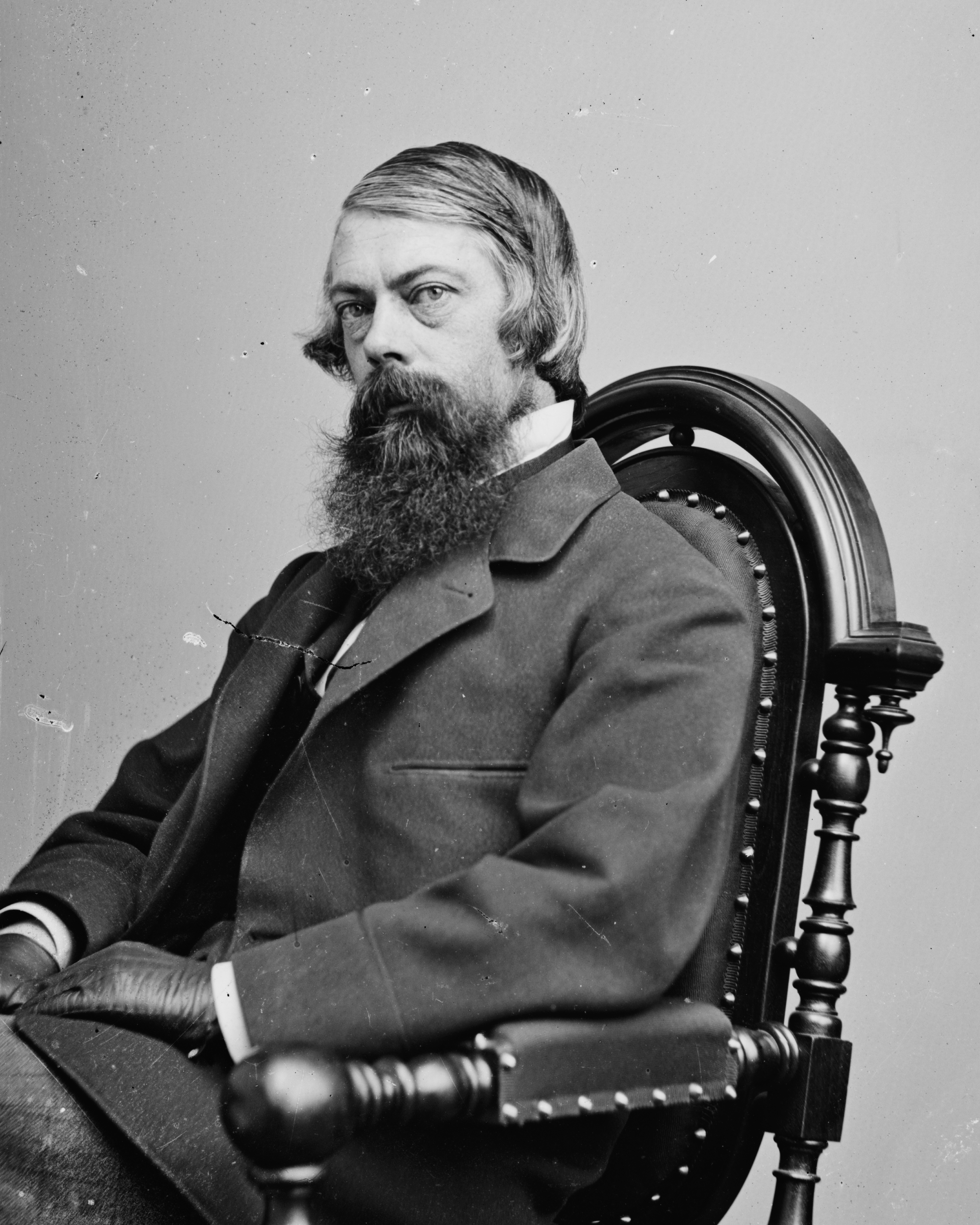

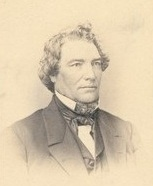
Nominee	Samuel G. Arnold	Nathan F. Dixon II
Party	Constitutional Union	Republican
Alliance	Democratic	—
1st ballot	71 (87.6%)	7 (8.6%)
Senator before election
James F. Simmons
Republican
Elected Senator
Samuel G. Arnold
Constitutional Union

Simmons resigned from the Senate on August 15, 1862, less than a year before the end of his term.

The General Assembly met in joint session on September 5, 1862, to hold a special election for the unexpired term. Democratic–Constitutional Union candidate Samuel G. Arnold defeated Nathan F. Dixon on the first ballot.

== Tennessee ==
Tennessee election
- No election
Senator before election
None (vacant from March 4, 1862)
Elected Senator
None

Incumbent Democrat Andrew Johnson resigned on March 4, 1862, following his appointment as military governor of Tennessee. The Tennessee General Assembly did not hold an election for the next term, and the seat remained vacant until 1866.

== Texas ==
Texas election
- No election
Senator before election
None (vacant from July 11, 1861)
Elected Senator
None

Incumbent Democrat Louis T. Wigfall was expelled from the Senate on July 11, 1861. The Texas Legislature did not hold an election for the next term, and the seat remained vacant until 1870.

== Vermont ==
Vermont election
- October 14, 1862

Members of the Vermont General Assembly Majority in both houses needed to win
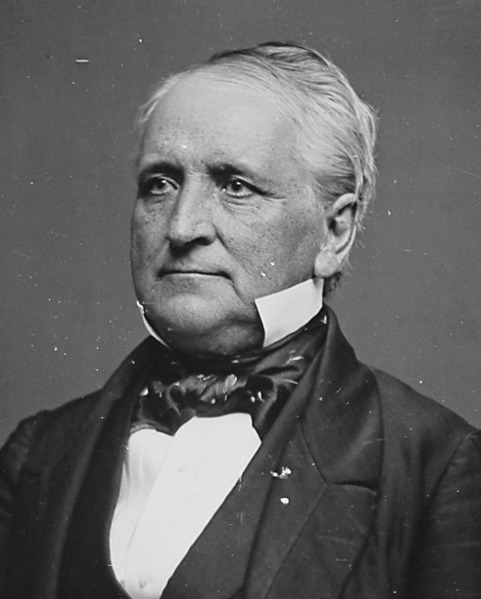

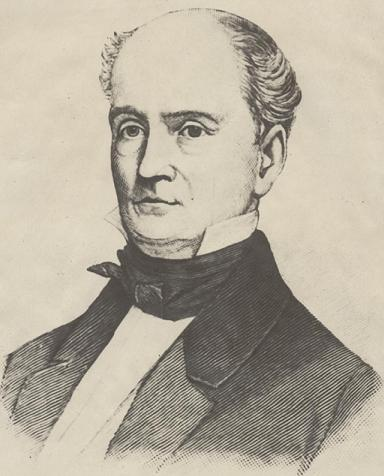
Nominee	Solomon Foot	Daniel Kellogg
Party	Republican	Democratic
House	206 (96.7%)	3 (1.4%)
Senate	30 (100.0%)	—
Senator before election
Solomon Foot
Republican
Elected Senator
Solomon Foot
Republican

Two-term Republican Solomon Foot was re-elected in 1856.

The Senate and the House of Representatives met separately on October 14, 1862, to hold an election for the next term. Foot defeated Daniel Kellogg on the first ballot.

== Virginia ==
Virginia election
- January 23, 1863

Members of the Restored Virginia General Assembly Majority of voting members needed to win
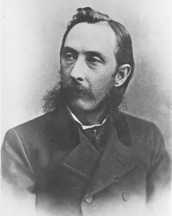

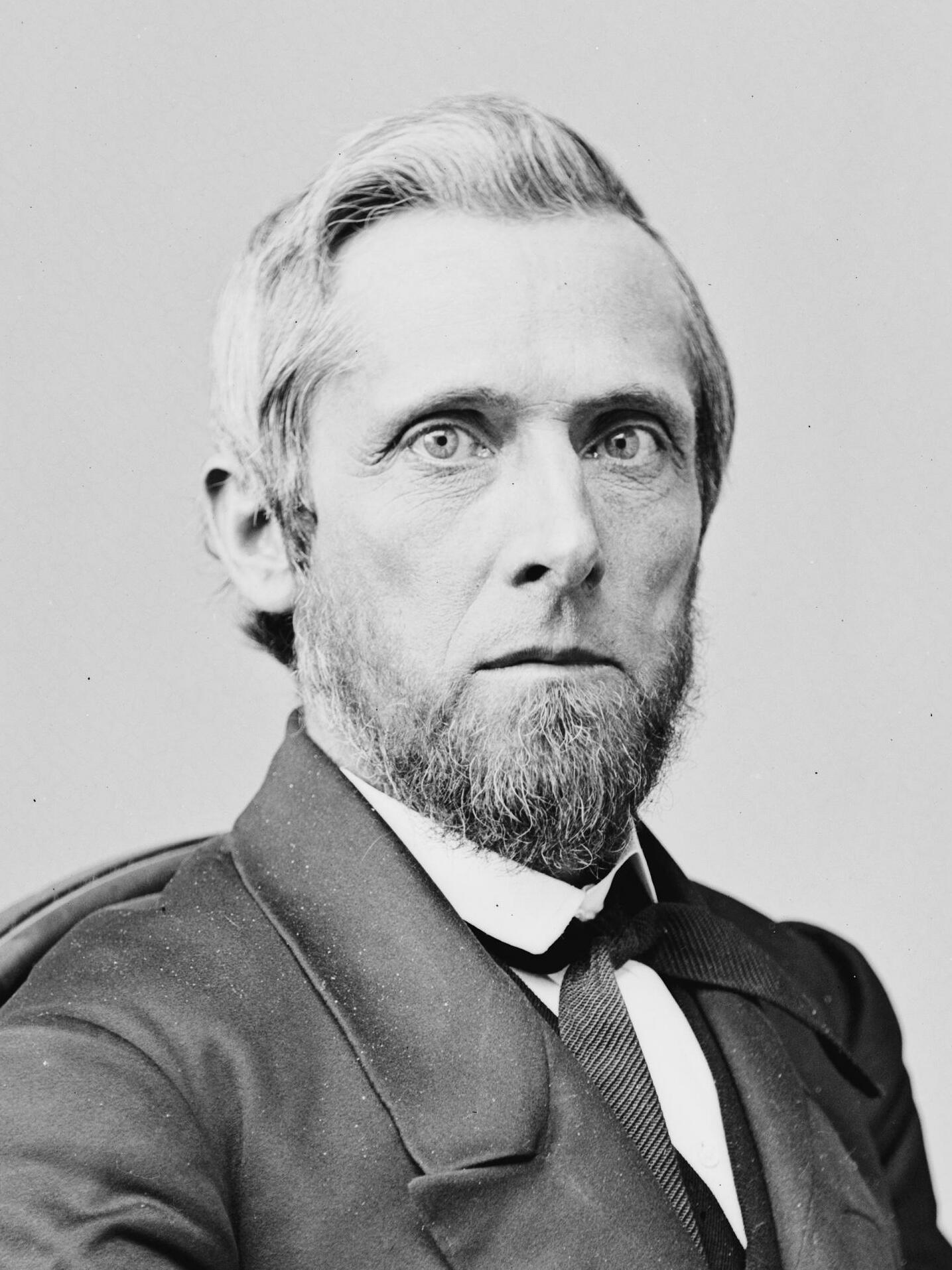

Nominee	Lemuel J. Bowden	Waitman T. Willey	Daniel Lamb
Party	Union	Union	Union
1st ballot	20 (40.8%)	16 (32.6%)	10 (20.4%)
2nd ballot	29 (59.2%)	19 (38.8%)	1 (2.0%)
Senator before election
Waitman T. Willey
Union
Elected Senator
Lemuel J. Bowden
Union

Incumbent Unionist Waitman T. Willey was elected in 1861 to fill the vacancy created by the expulsion of James M. Mason.

The Restored Virginia General Assembly met on January 23, 1863, to hold an election for the next term. Voting proceeded separately in the Senate and the House of Delegates, after which the votes were tallied jointly. Lemuel J. Bowden defeated Willey on the second ballot.

== West Virginia ==
West Virginia election
- August 4, 1863

Members of the West Virginia Legislature Majority of voting members needed to win
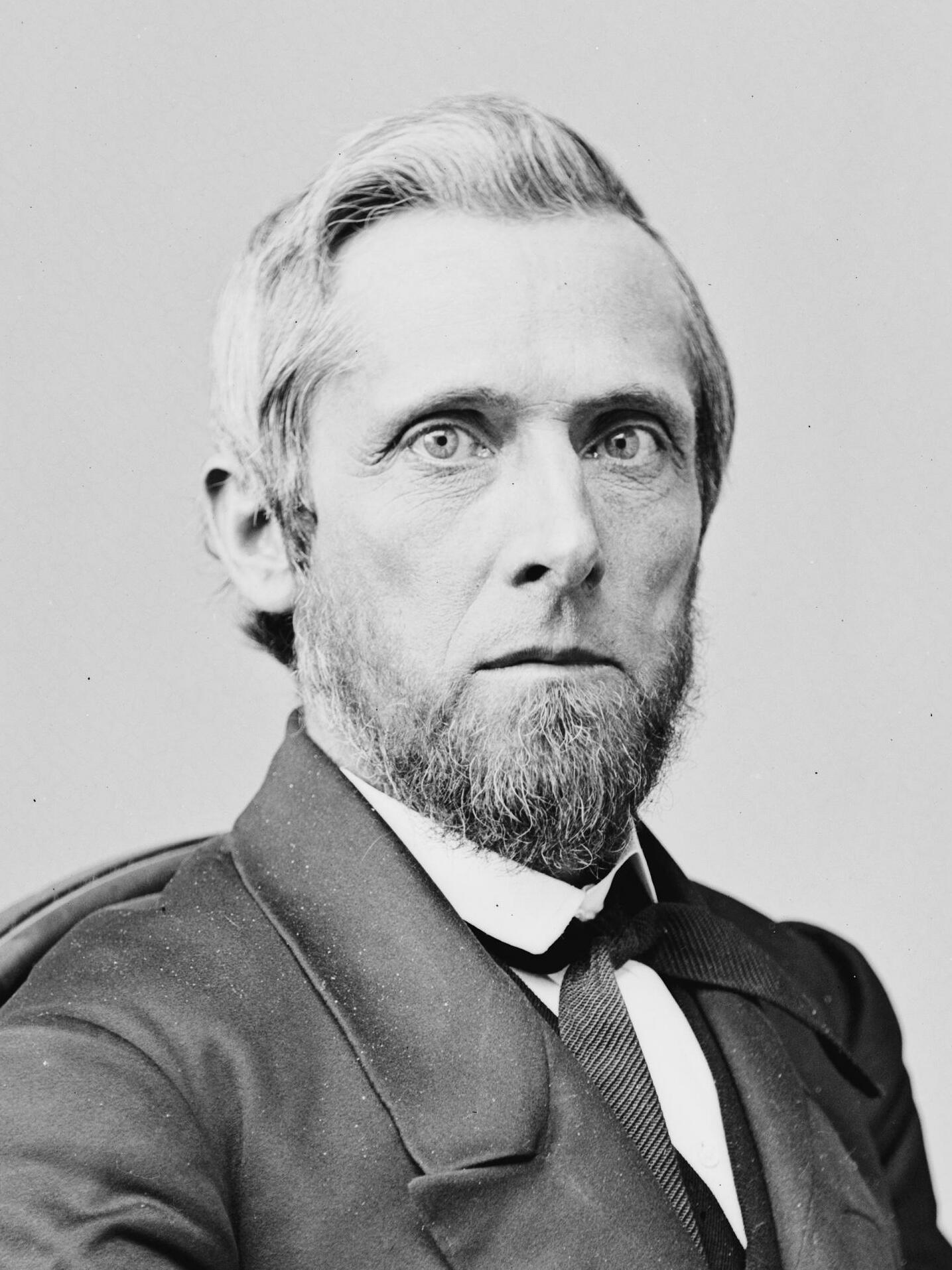

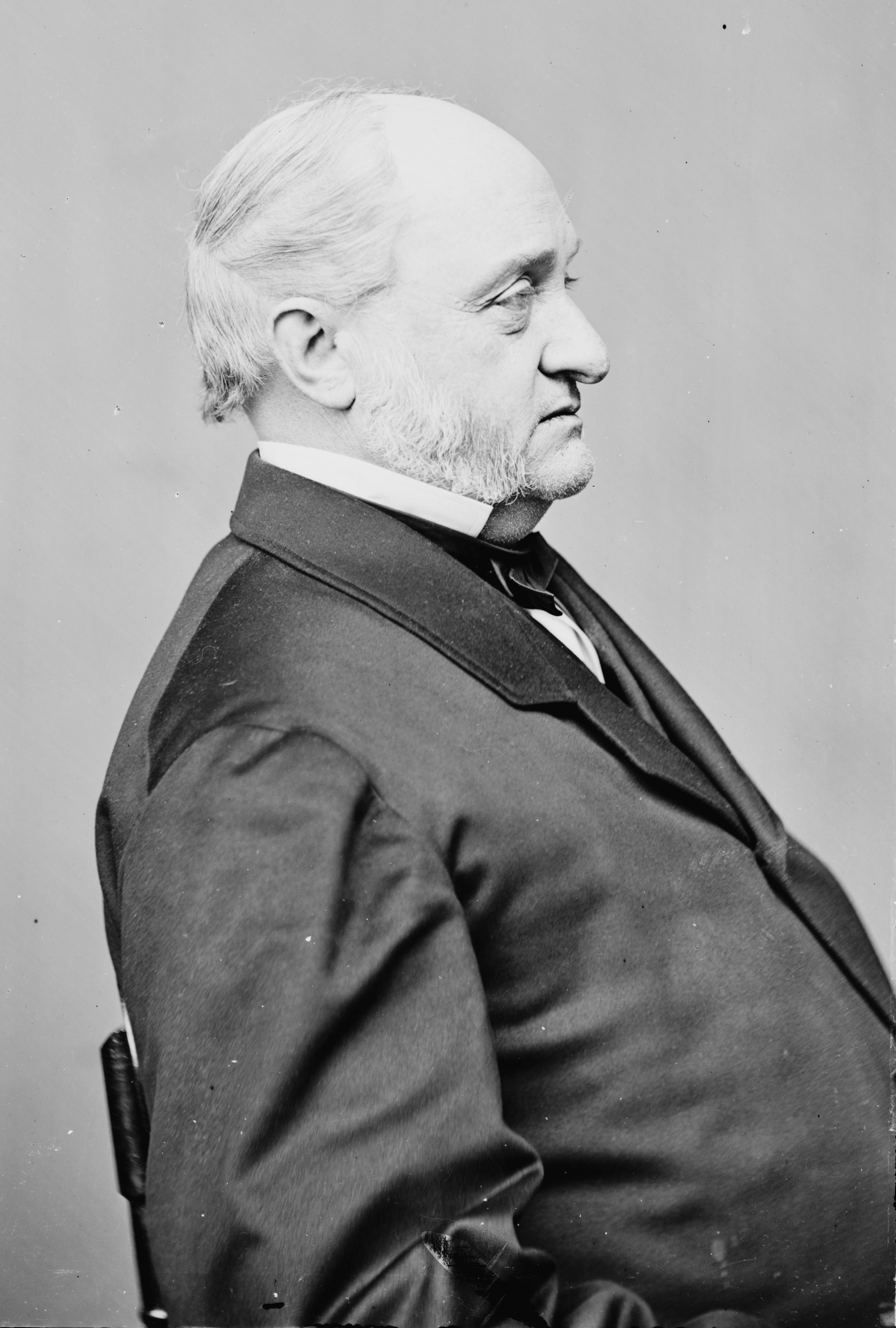

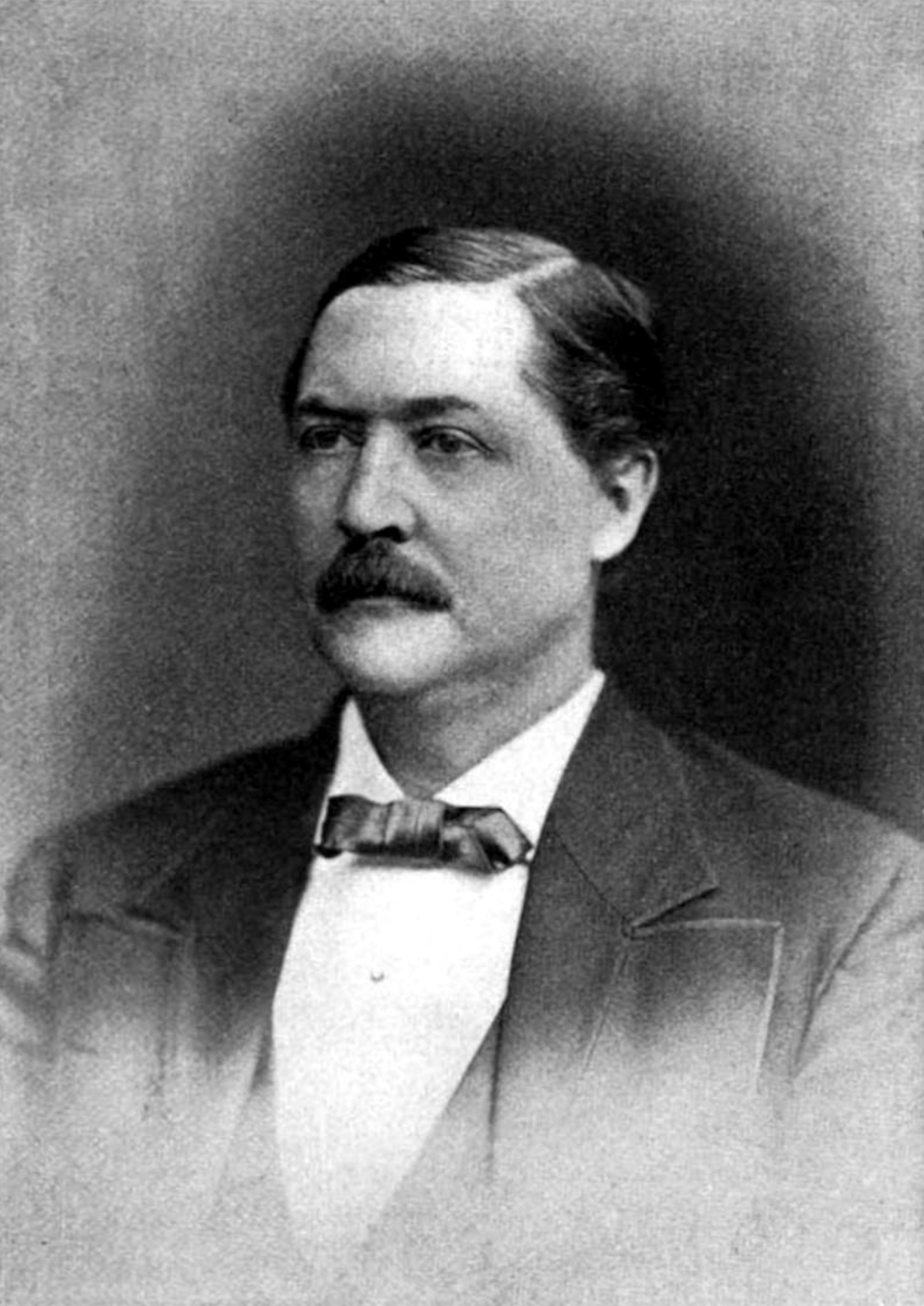

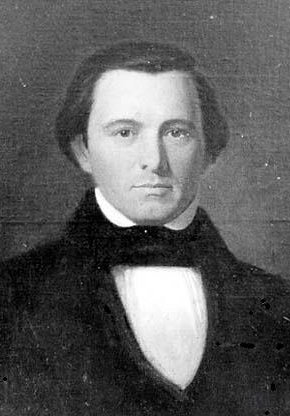
Nominee	Waitman T. Willey	Peter G. Van Winkle	Archibald W. Campbell
Party	Union	Union	Union
1st ballot	50 (73.5%)	22 (32.4%)	27 (39.7%)
6th ballot	✓	46 (68.6%)	12 (17.9%)
Nominee	Benjamin H. Smith	Daniel Lamb	George W. Summers
Party	Union	Union
1st ballot	24 (35.3%)	5 (7.35%)	3 (4.4%)
6th ballot	2 (3.0%)	—	6 (8.9%)
Senators before election
None
Elected Senators
Peter G. Van Winkle (Class 1)
Waitman T. Willey (Class 2)
Union

West Virginia elected two senators following its admission on June 20, 1863.

The West Virginia Legislature met on August 4, 1863, to hold elections for both seats. Members voted for two candidates on the first ballot; voting proceeded separately in the Senate and the House of Delegates, after which the votes were tallied jointly.

Waitman T. Willey was elected on the first ballot; Archibald W. Cambpell finished second, but without a majority. On subsequent ballots, each member cast one vote; Peter G. Van Winkle defeated Campbell on the sixth ballot. Willey, Van Winkle, and Campbell represented the Union Party.

== Wisconsin ==
Wisconsin election
- January 22, 1863

Members of the Wisconsin State Assembly Majority of voting members needed to win
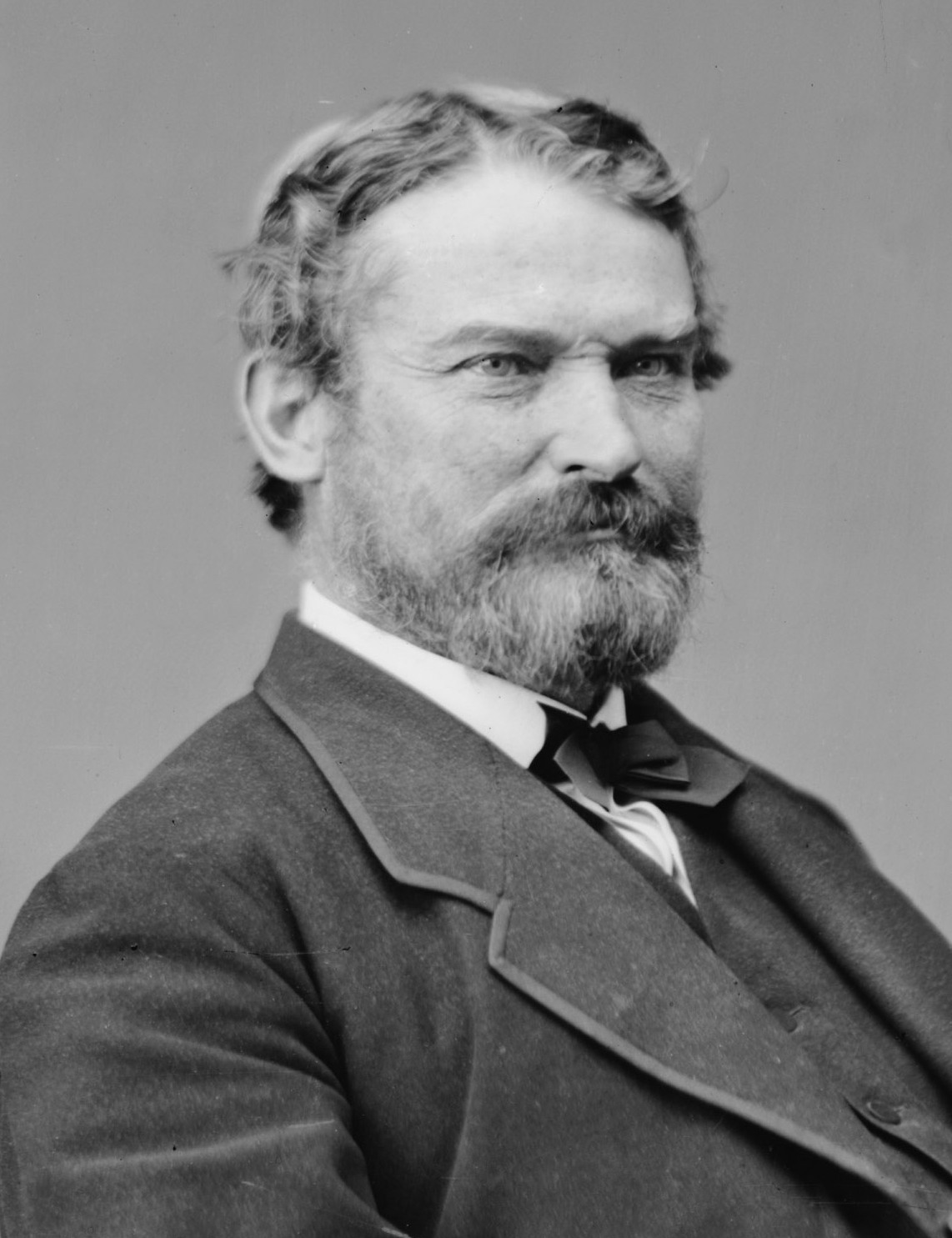

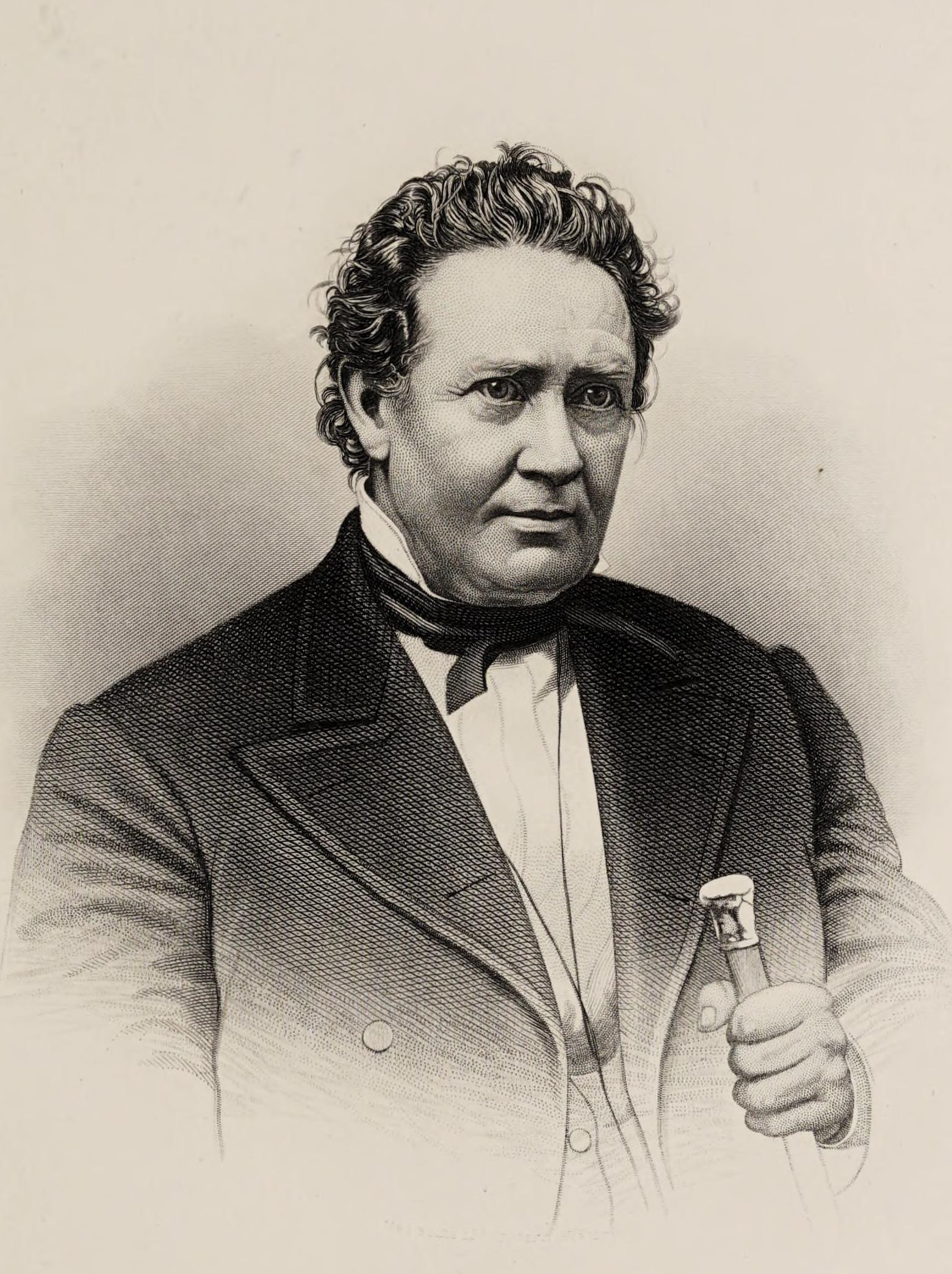
Nominee	James R. Doolittle	Edward George Ryan
Party	Republican	Democratic
1st ballot	73 (55.3%)	57 (43.2%)
Senator before election
James R. Doolittle
Republican
Elected Senator
James R. Doolittle
Republican

One-term Republican James R. Doolittle was elected in 1857.

Doolittle was a prominent supporter of colonizing free people of color outside the United States, considering such essential to any plan of emancipation. His endorsement of Lincoln's gradual emancipation scheme proved divisive with Wisconsin Republicans during the 1862 state elections. Radical Republicans mocked Doolittle's "wild notions of colonization" and called on Lincoln to adopt immediate emancipation and Black enlistment as the basis of a national policy. The preliminary Emancipation Proclamation accepted the premise of the radical position, helping to heal Republican divisions and sow discord among the opposition in the final weeks before the election.

The Wisconsin State Assembly met in joint session on January 22, 1863, to hold an election for the next term. Doolittle defeated Democratic candidate Edward George Ryan on the first ballot.

== See also ==
- 1862 United States elections
  - 1862–63 United States House of Representatives elections
- 37th United States Congress
- 38th United States Congress

== Bibliography ==
=== Primary sources ===
- Annual Cyclopaedia (1863). The American Annual Cyclopaedia and Register of Important Events of the Year 1862. New York: D. Appleton & Co.
- California (1863). The Journal of the Assembly [...]. Sacramento.
- Delaware (1863). Journal of the House of Representatives [...]. Dover.
- Evening Journal Almanac (1863). The Evening Journal Almanac: 1863. Albany.
- Evening Journal Almanac (1864). The Evening Journal Almanac: 1864. Albany.
- Greeley, Horace, ed. (1863). The Tribune Almanac and Political Register for 1863. New York.
- Greeley, Horace, ed. (1864). The Tribune Almanac and Political Register for 1864. New York.
- Illinois (1863). Journal of the House of Representatives [...]. Springfield.
- Indiana (1863). Journal of the House of Representatives [...]. Indianapolis.
- Maryland (1862). Journal of the Proceedings of the House of Delegates [...]. Annapolis.
- Michigan (1863). Journal of the Senate [...]. Lansing.
- Minnesota (1863). Journal of the House of Representatives [...]. St. Paul.
- Missouri (1863a). Journal of the Senate [...]. Jefferson City.
- Missouri (1863b). Journal of the House of Representatives [...]. Jefferson City.
- New Jersey (1863). Journal of the Nineteenth Senate [...]. Morristown.
- New York (1863a). Journal of the Senate [...]. Albany.
- New York (1863b). Journal of the Assembly [...]. Albany.
- Ohio (1863). Journal of the House of Representatives [...]. Columbus.
- Oregon (1862). Journal of the Proceedings of the House [...]. Salem.
- Restored Government of Virginia (1862). Journal of the House of Delegates [...]. Wheeling.
- Rhode Island (1862). Acts and Resolves of the General Assembly [...]. Providence.
- Wisconsin (1863). Journal of the Assembly [...]. Madison.

=== Secondary sources ===
- Allardice, Bruce S. (Spring–Summer 2011). "'Illinois is Rotten with Traitors!' The Republican Defeat in the 1862 State Election". Journal of the Illinois State Historical Society. 104 (1/2): 97–114. JSTOR 41201305.
- Baker, Jean H. (1973). The Politics of Continuity: Maryland Political Parties from 1858 to 1870. Baltimore: Johns Hopkins University Press.
- Baum, Dale (1984). The Civil War Party System: The Case of Massachusetts, 1848–1876. Chapel Hill: University of North Carolina Press.
- Bradley, Erwin Stanley (1964). The Triumph of Militant Republicanism: A Study of Pennsylvania and Presidential Politics, 1860–1872. Philadelphia: University of Pennsylvania Press.
- Carey, Charles Henry (1922). History of Oregon. Chicago: Pioneer Historical Publishing Company.
- Congressional Quarterly (1985). Congressional Quarterly's Guide to U.S. Elections (2nd ed.). Washington D.C.: Congressional Quarterly. ISBN 978-0-87187-339-2.
- Current, Richard N. (1976). The History of Wisconsin. Vol. 2: The Civil War Era, 1848–1873. Madison: State Historical Society of Wisconsin.
- Dell, Christopher (1975). Lincoln and the War Democrats: The Grand Erosion of Conservative Tradition. Rutherford, NJ: Farleigh Dickenson University Press.
- Donald, David (1970). Charles Sumner and the Rights of Man. New York: Alfred A. Knopf.
- Haugland, John C. (December 1961). "Politics, Patronage, and Ramsey's Rise to Power, 1861-63". Minnesota History. 37 (8): 324–34.
- Hittell, Theodore H. (1898). History of California. San Francisco.
- Knapp, Charles Merriam (1924). New Jersey Politics during the Period of the Civil War and Reconstruction. Geneva, New York: J. W. Humphrey.
- McKinney, Gordon B. (1978). Southern Mountain Republicans, 1865–1900: Politics and the Appalachian Community. Chapel Hill: University of North Carolina Press.
- McPherson, James M. (1988). Battle Cry of Freedom: The Civil War Era. New York: Oxford University.
- Mering, John (April 1959). "The Political Transition of James S. Rollins". Missouri Historical Review. 53 (3): 217–226.
- National Archives (February 8, 2022). "17th Amendment to the U.S. Constitution: Direct Election of U.S. Senators (1913)". National Archives and Records Administration.
- Parrish, William E. (1973). A History of Missouri, Volume 3: 1860 to 1875. Columbia: University of Missouri Press. ISBN 978-0-8262-0108-9.
- Parrish, William E. (1963). Turbulent Partnership: Missouri and the Union, 1861–1865. Columbia, MO: University of Missouri Press. LCCN 63-8072.
- Powell, Walter A. (1928). A History of Delaware. Boston: Christopher Publishing House.
- Silbey, Joel H. (1977). A Respectable Minority: The Democratic Party in the Civil War Era, 1860–1868. New York: W. W. Norton and Company. ISBN 978-0-393-05648-8.
- Smith, Adam I. P. (2006). No Party Now: Politics in the Civil War North. New York: Oxford University Press. ISBN 978-0-19-518865-3.
- Thompson, William F. (1952). The Political Career of Milton Slocum Latham of California (PhD thesis). Stanford University.
- Thornbrough, Emma Lou (1995). Indiana in the Civil War Era, 1850–1880. Indianapolis: Indiana Historical Society.
- Trefousse, H. L. (1963). Benjamin Franklin Wade: Radical Republican from Ohio. New York: Twayne Publishers.
