= 37th United States Congress =

1861-1863 U.S. Congress

←	36th	38th	→
- United States Capitol (1861)

Overview
- Legislative body: United States Congress
- Jurisdiction: United States
- Term: March 4, 1861 – March 4, 1863

Senate
- Members: 50
- President: Hannibal Hamlin (R)
- President pro tempore: Solomon Foot (R)
- Party control: Republican

House of Representatives
- Members: 183 representatives 7 non-voting delegates
- Speaker: Galusha A. Grow (R)
- Party control: Republican

Sessions
- Special (Note: Special session of the Senate.): March 4, 1861 – March 28, 1861
- 1st: July 4, 1861 – August 6, 1861
- 2nd: December 2, 1861 – July 17, 1862
- 3rd: December 1, 1862 – March 3, 1863

The 37th United States Congress was a meeting of the legislative branch of the United States federal government, consisting of the United States Senate and the United States House of Representatives. It met in Washington, D.C., from March 4, 1861, to March 4, 1863, during the first two years of Abraham Lincoln's presidency. The apportionment of seats in the House of Representatives was based on the 1850 United States census.

For the first time since the party's establishment, the Republicans won the majority of both chambers, and thus full control of Congress. When Abraham Lincoln becoming the first Republican president after being sworn in on March 4, 1861, the Republicans had their first ever overall federal government trifecta.

== Major events ==
- March 4, 1861: Republican pluralities are seated in Senate and House, becoming governing majorities in both Houses given vacancies among Southerners. Louisiana has 2 of 4 representatives remaining. Although represented in the Confederate Congress, Missouri and Kentucky remained with full delegations in the 37th Congress.
- March 4, 1861: Abraham Lincoln is inaugurated President of the United States.
- April 12–14, 1861: Battle of Fort Sumter, Civil War began.
- April 19, 1861: Union blockade of the South begins at Fort Monroe, Virginia.
- April 27, 1861: President Lincoln suspends habeas corpus from Washington, D.C., to Philadelphia and called up 75,000 militia.
- May 6, 1861: Arkansas Secession Convention enacted an Ordinance of Secession.
- May 20, 1861: North Carolina Secession Convention enacted an Ordinance of Secession.
- May 23, 1861: Virginia popular referendum ratified Ordinance of Secession. 5 of 12 U.S. Representatives remained. Two senators from the "Restored Government of Virginia" replaced the two who withdrew.
- June 8, 1861: Tennessee popular referendum ratified Ordinance of Secession. 3 of 10 U.S. Representatives remain. One Senator, Andrew Johnson, remained.
- July 21, 1861: First Battle of Bull Run Union approach to Richmond is repulsed.
- September 17, 1862: Battle of Antietam rebel invasion into Maryland is repulsed.
- September 22, 1862: Emancipation Proclamation ordered, to begin January 1, 1863.
- November 1862: 1862 and 1863 United States House of Representatives elections and 1862 and 1863 United States Senate elections: Democrats gained 31 House seats to 31% and lost 5 Senate seats to 19%.

=== Two special sessions ===
The Senate, a continuing body, was called into special session by President Lincoln, meeting from March 4 to 28, 1861. The border states and Texas were still represented. Shortly after the Senate session adjourned, Fort Sumter was attacked. The immediate results were to draw four additional states "into the confederacy with their more Southern sisters", and Lincoln called Congress into extraordinary session on July 4, 1861. The Senate confirmed calling forth troops and raising money to suppress rebellion as authorized in the Constitution.

Both Houses then duly met July 4, 1861. Seven states which would send representatives held their state elections for Representative over the months of May to June 1861. Members taking their seats had been elected before the secession crisis, during the formation of the Confederate government, and after Fort Sumter.

Once assembled with a quorum in the House, Congress approved Lincoln's war powers innovations as necessary to preserve the Union. Following the July Federal defeat at First Manassas, the Crittenden Resolution asserted the reason for "the present deplorable civil war". It was meant as an address to the nation, especially to the Border States at a time of U.S. military reverses, when the war support in border state populations was virtually the only thing keeping them in the Union.

Following resignations and expulsions occasioned by the outbreak of the Civil War, five states had some degree of dual representation in the U.S. and the C.S. congresses. Congress accredited Members elected running in these five as Unionist (19), Democratic (6), Constitutional Unionist (1) and Republican (1). All ten Kentucky and all seven Missouri representatives were accepted. The other three states seated four of thirteen representatives from Virginia, three of ten Tennesseans, and two of four from Louisiana.

The Crittenden Resolution declared the civil war "... has been forced upon the country by the disunionists of the southern States..." and it would be carried out for the supremacy of the Constitution and the preservation of the Union, and, that accomplished, "the war ought to cease". Democrats seized on this document, especially its assurances of no conquest or overthrowing domestic institutions (emancipation of slaves).

Steps to emancipation - by Congress, Generals and Lincoln
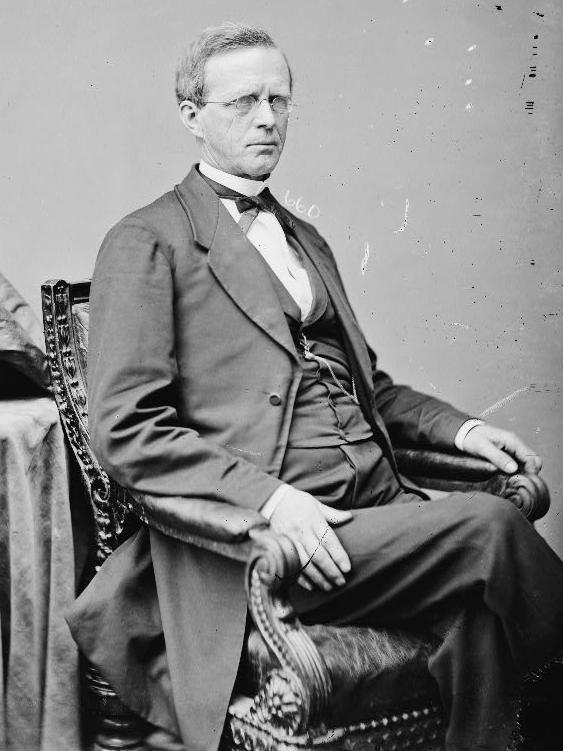
Sen. Lyman Trumbull
1st Confiscation Act

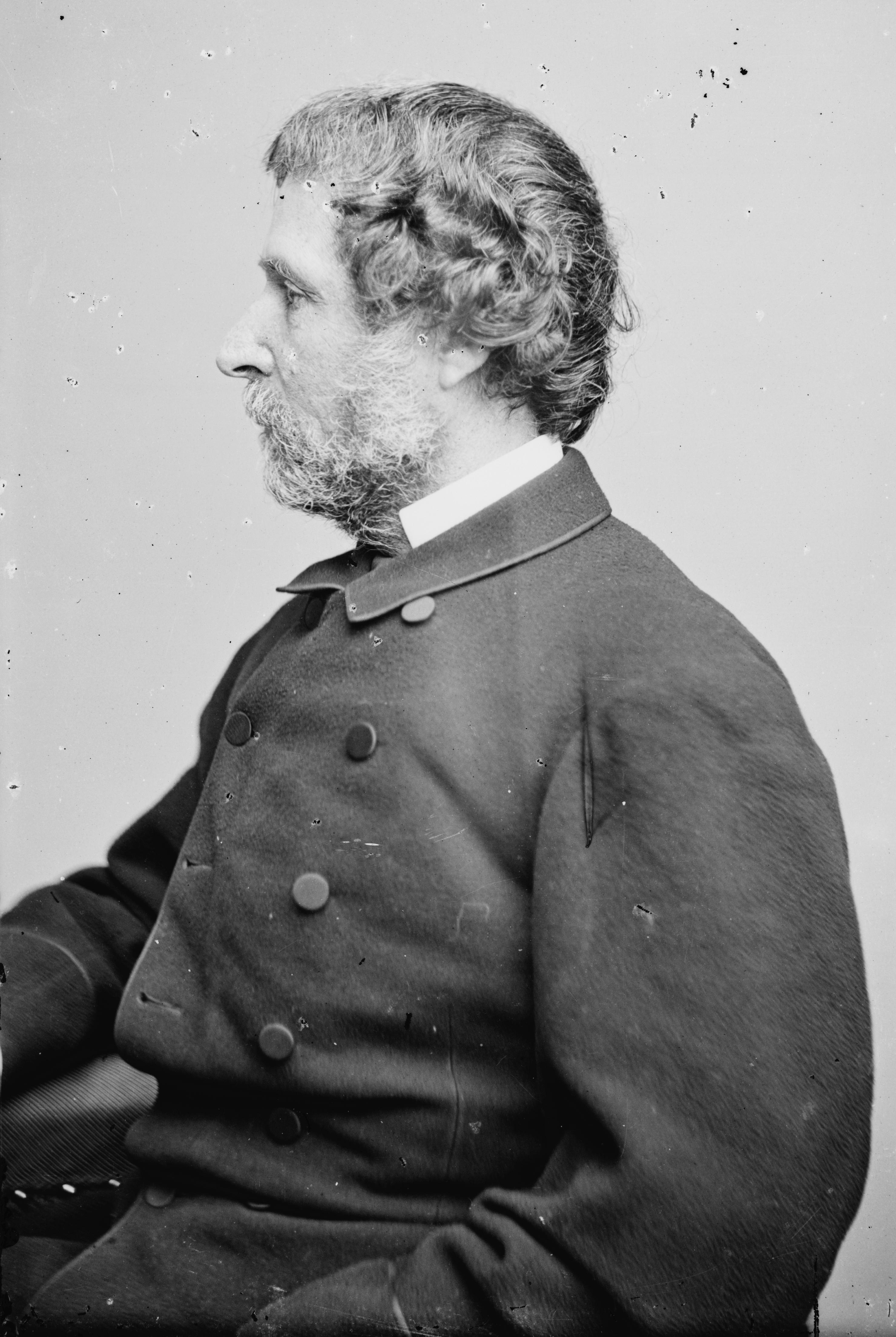
Gen. John C. Frémont
Missouri Emancipation

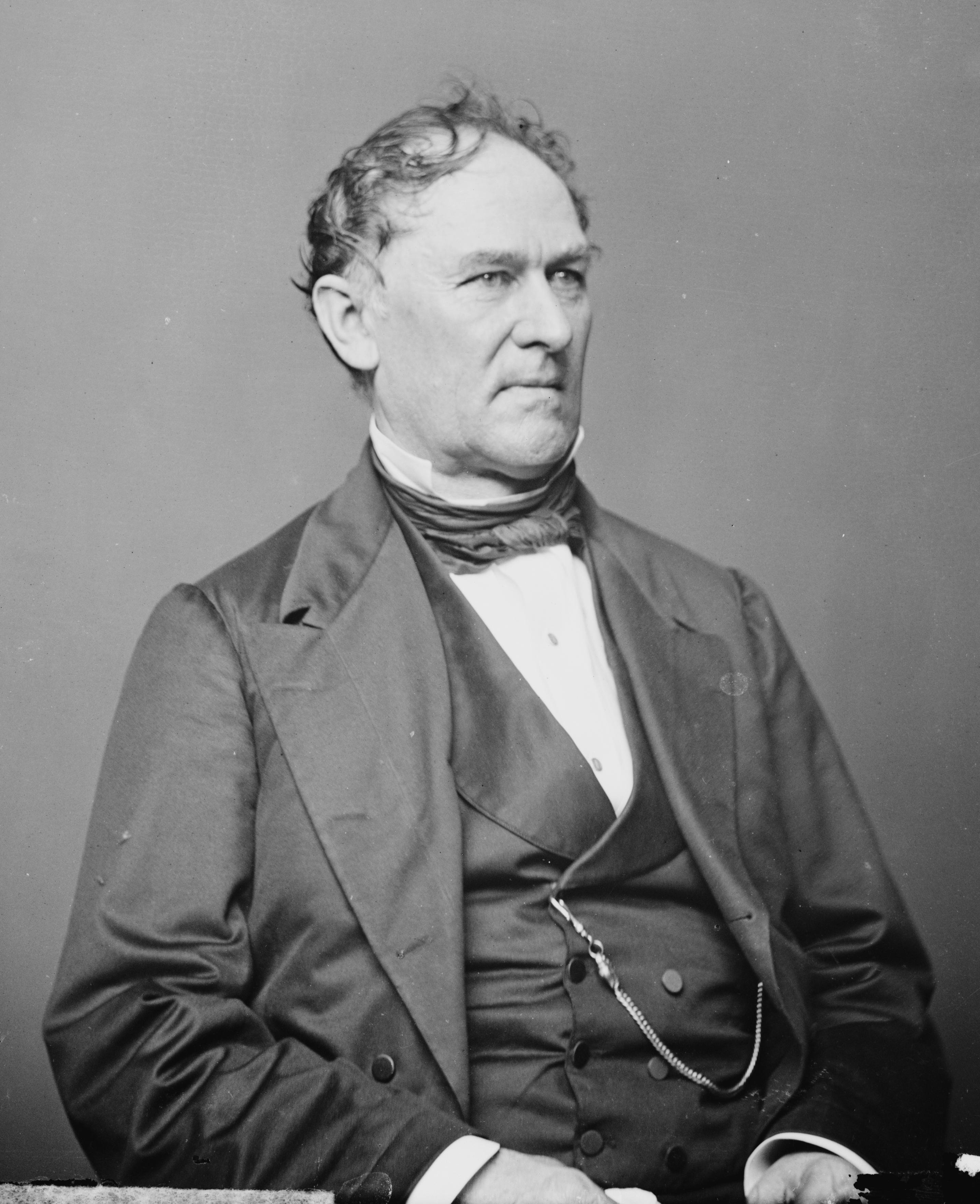
Sen. Orville H. Browning
DC Emancipation

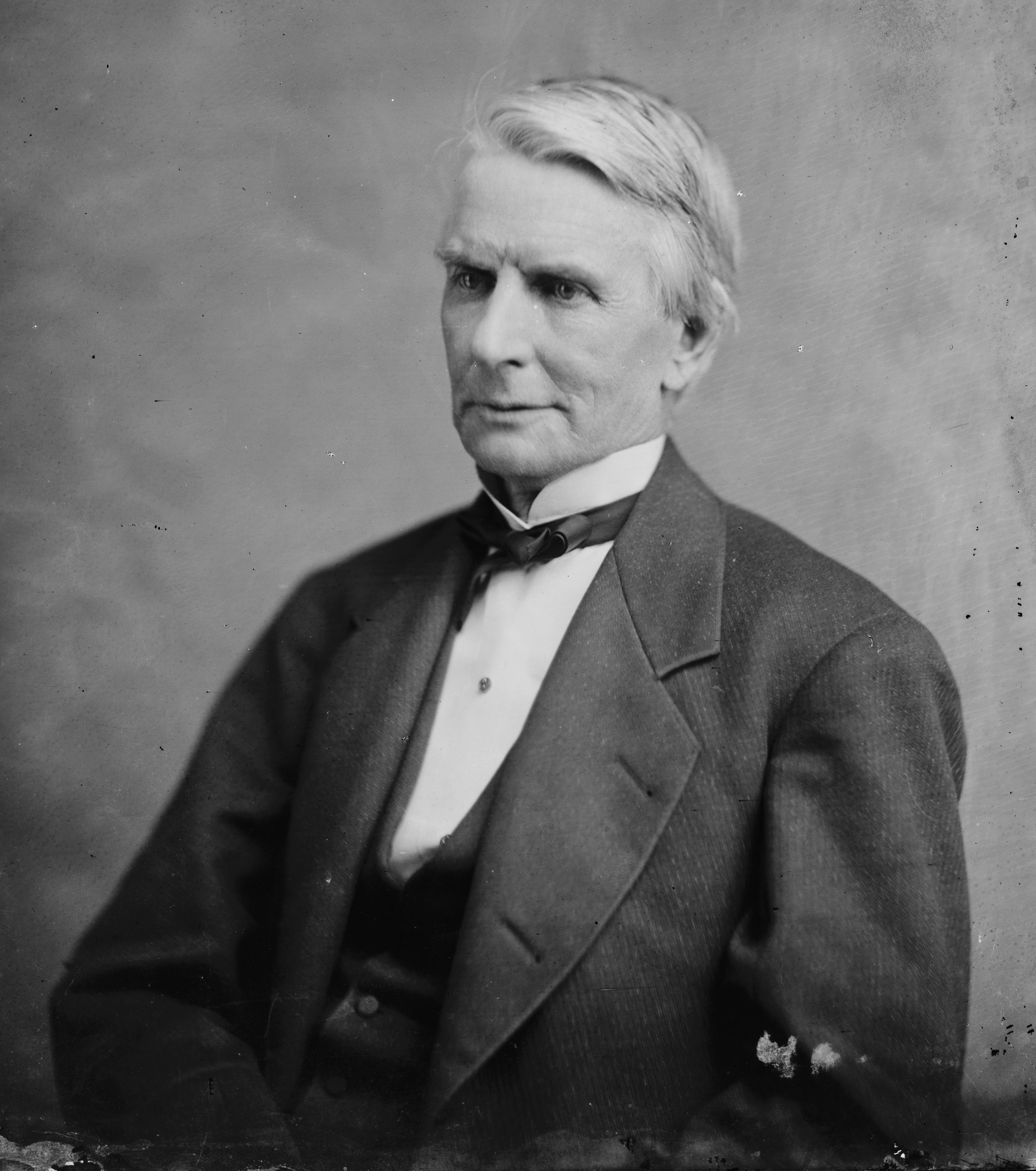
Sen. Timothy O. Howe
Army accepts Fugitives

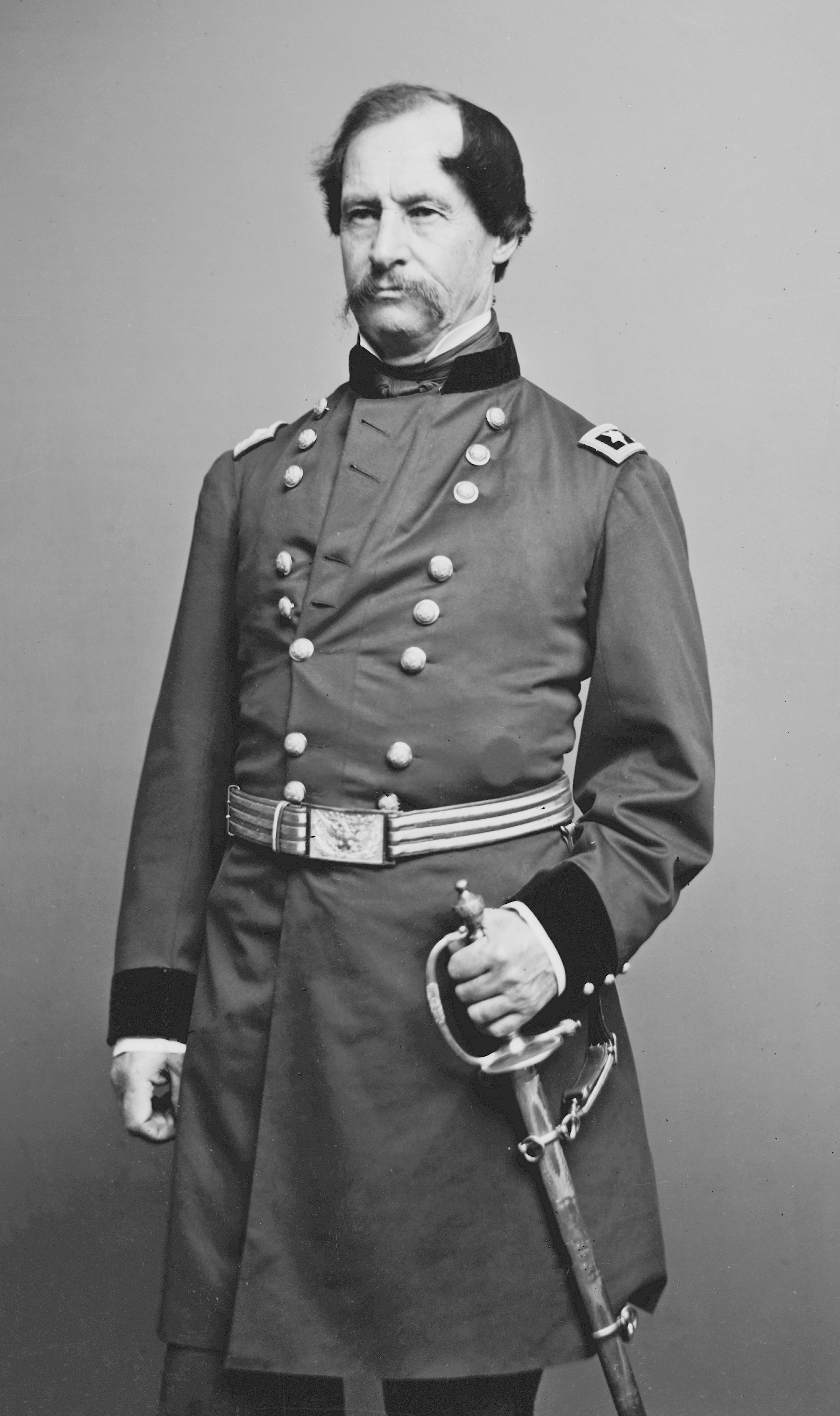
Gen. David Hunter
SC-GA-FL Emancipation

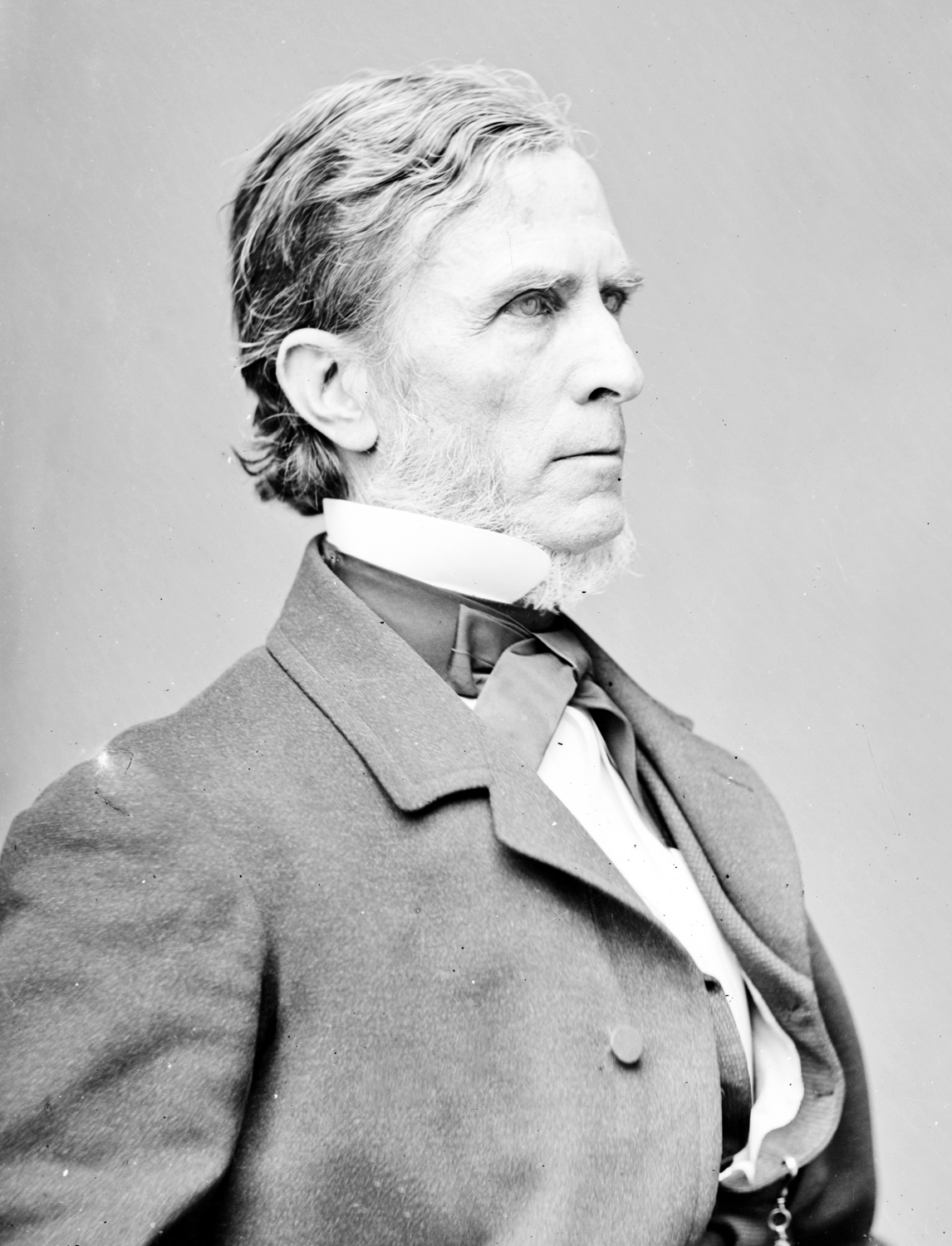
Sen. William Fessenden
2nd Confiscation Act

=== Slaves and slavery ===
Congressional policy and military strategy were intertwined. In the first regular March session, Republicans superseded the Crittenden Resolution, removing the prohibition against emancipation of slaves.

In South Carolina, Gen. David Hunter issued a General Order in early May 1862 freeing all slaves in Florida, Georgia, and South Carolina. President Lincoln quickly rescinded the order, reserving this "supposed power" to his own discretion if it were indispensable to saving the Union. Later in the same month without directly disobeying Lincoln's prohibition against emancipation, General Benjamin Butler at Fort Monroe Virginia declared slaves escaped into his lines as "contraband of war", that is, forfeit to their rebel owners. On May 24, Congress followed General Butler's lead, and passed the First Confiscation Act in August, freeing slaves used for rebellion.

In Missouri, John C. Frémont, the 1856 Republican nominee for president, exceeded his authority as a General, declaring that all slaves held by rebels within his military district would be freed. Republican majorities in Congress responded on opening day of the December Session. Sen. Lyman Trumbull introduced a bill for confiscation of rebel property and emancipation for their slaves. "Acrimonious debate on confiscation proved a major preoccupation" of Congress. On March 13, 1862, Congress banned military officers from enforcing the Fugitive Slave Act under penalty of dismissal. The next month, the Congress abolished slavery in the District of Columbia with compensation for loyal citizens. An additional Confiscation Act in July declared free all slaves held by citizens in rebellion, but it had no practical effect without addressing where the act would take effect, or how ownership was to be proved.

Lincoln's preliminary Emancipation Proclamation was issued September 22, 1862. It became the principal issue before the public in the mid-term elections that year for the 38th Congress. But Republican majorities in both houses held (see 'Congress as a campaign machine' below), and the Republicans actually increased their majority in the Senate.

On January 1, 1863, the war measure by executive proclamation directed the army and the navy to treat all escaped slaves as free when entering Union lines from territory still in rebellion. The measure would take effect when the escaped slave entered Union lines and loyalty of the previous owner was irrelevant. Congress passed enabling legislation to carry out the Proclamation including "Freedman's Bureau" legislation. The practical effect was a massive internal evacuation of Confederate slave labor, and augmenting Union Army teamsters, railroad crews and infantry for the duration of the Civil War.

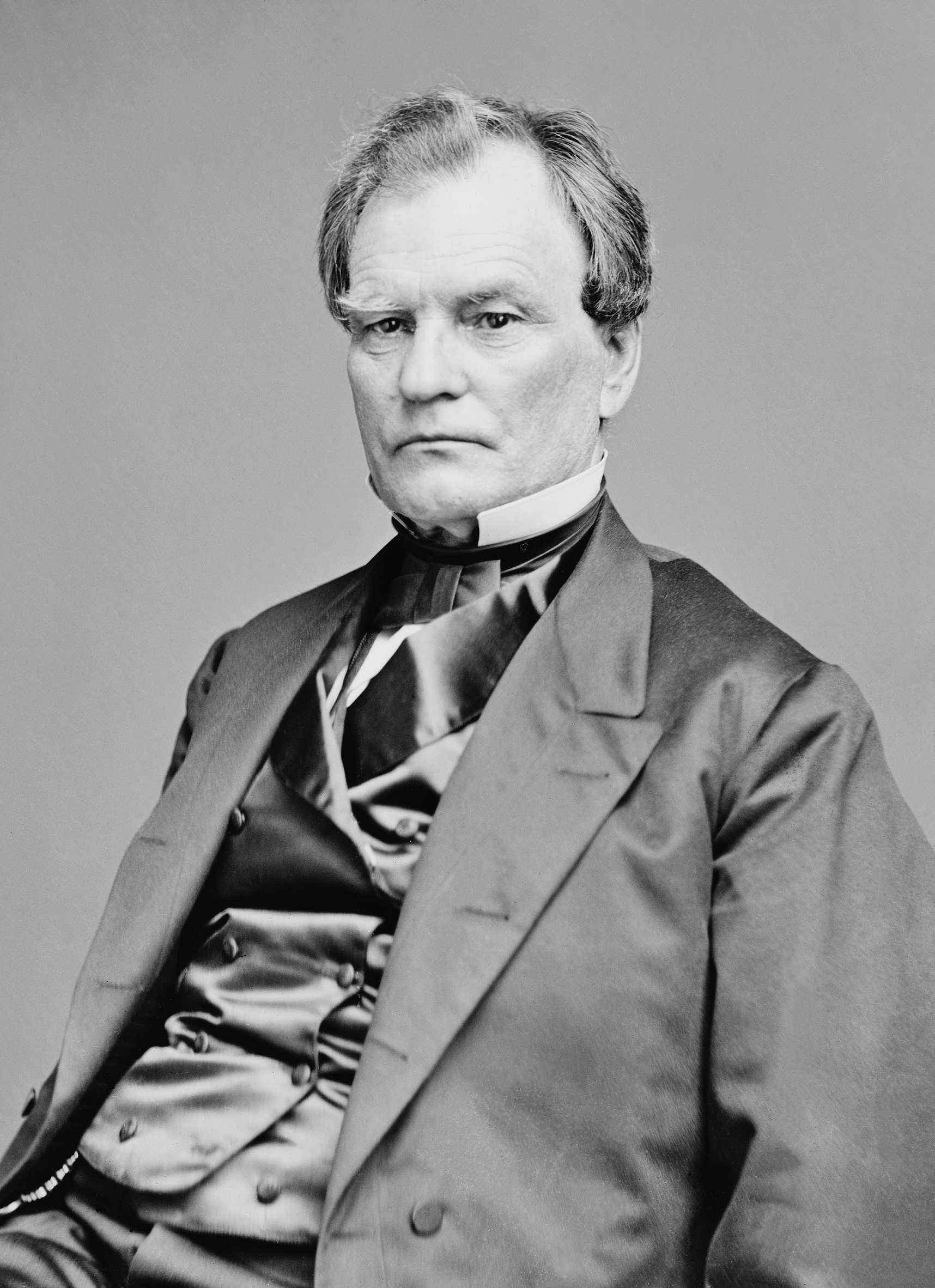
Sen. Ben Wade OH
showed army corruption

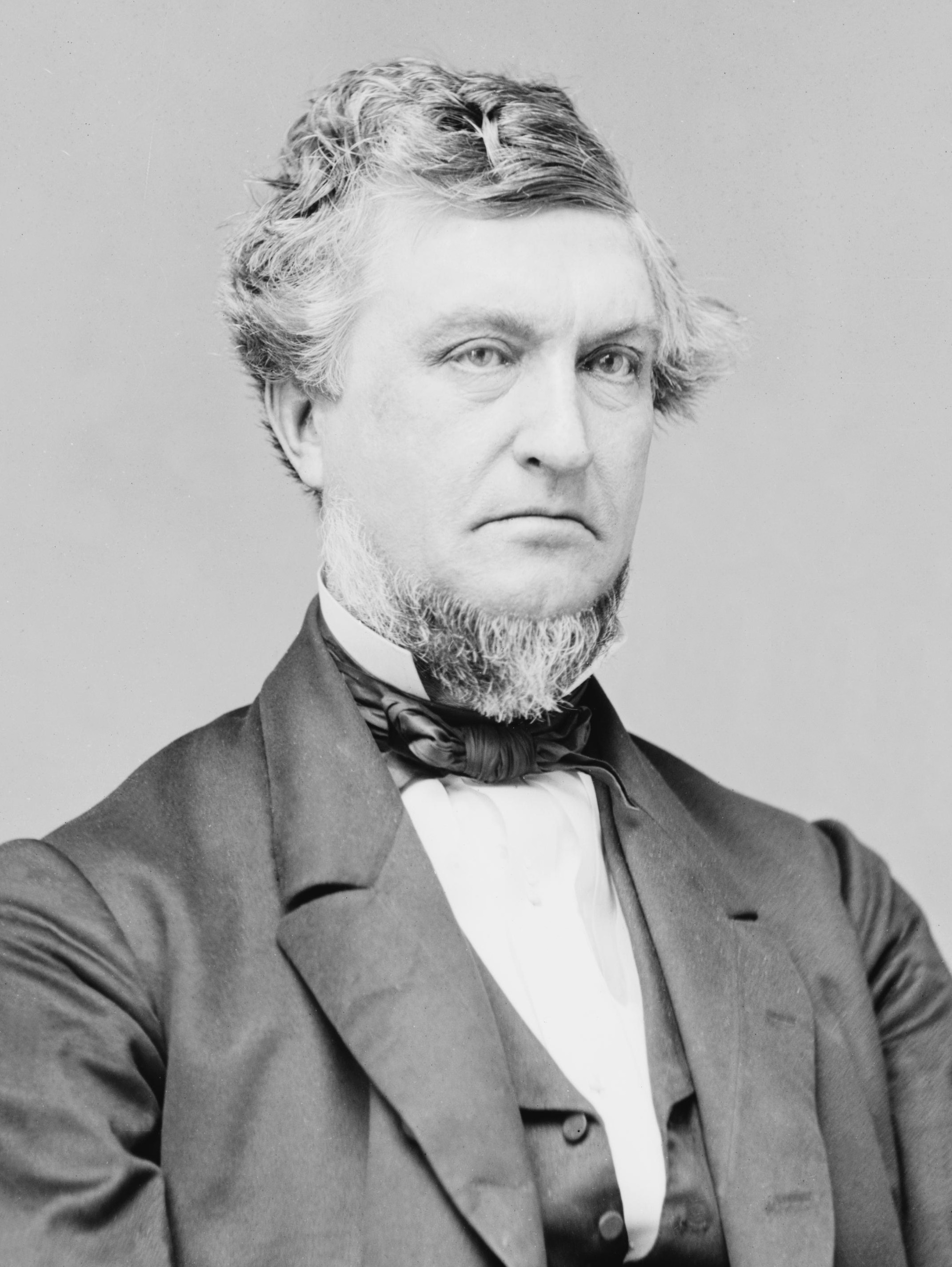
Sen. Z. Chandler MI
made & broke generals

=== Joint Committee on the Conduct of the War ===
Congress assumed watchdog responsibilities with this and other investigating committees.

The principle conflict between the president and congress was found in the Joint Committee on the Conduct of the War. Eight thick volumes of testimony were filled with investigations of Union defeats and contractor scandals.

They were highly charged with partisan opinions "vehemently expressed" by chair Benjamin Wade of Ohio, Representative George Washington Julian of Indiana, and Zachariah Chandler of Michigan.

Sen. Chandler, who had been one of McClellan's advocates promoting his spectacular rise, particularly documented criticism of McClellan's Peninsular Campaign with its circuitous maneuvering, endless entrenchment and murderous camp diseases. It led to support for his dismissal.

A congressional committee could ruin a reputation, without itself having any military expertise. It would create the modern Congressional era in which generals fought wars with Congress looking over their shoulders, "and with public opinion following closely behind".

=== Republican Platform goals ===
Republican majorities in both houses, apart from pro-union Democrats, and without vacant southern delegations, were able to enact their party platform. These included the Legal Tender Act, February 20, 1862, and increases in the tariff that amounted to protective tariffs. The Homestead Act, May 20, 1862, for government lands, and the Morrill Land Grant Act, July 2, 1862, for universities promoting practical arts in agriculture and mining, had no immediate war purpose. But they would have long range effects, as would the Pacific Railroad Act, July 1, 1862, for a transcontinental railroad.

Treasury innovations were driven by Secretary Salmon P. Chase and necessity of war. The Income Tax of 1861, numerous taxes on consumer goods such as whiskey, and a national currency all began in Civil War Congresses.

=== Congress as election machinery ===
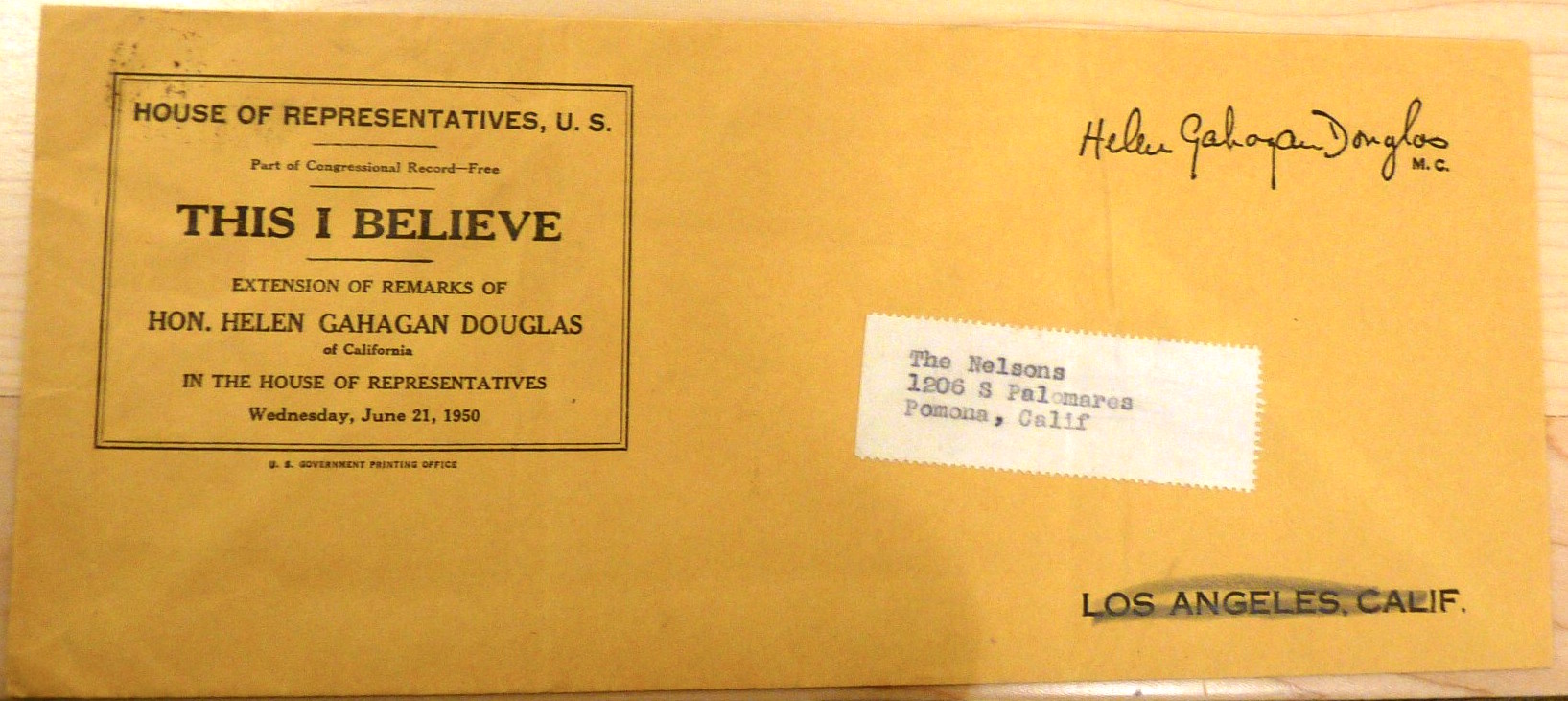
Speeches postage-free to District 1960, signature in upper right like 1863.

Member's floor speeches were not meant to be persuasive, but for publication in partisan newspapers. The real audience was the constituents back home. Congressional caucuses organized and funded political campaigns, publishing pamphlet versions of speeches and circulating them by the thousands free of postage on the member's franking privilege. Party congressional committees stayed in Washington during national campaigns, keeping an open flow of subsidized literature pouring back into the home districts.

Nevertheless, like other Congresses in the 1850s and 1860s, this Congress would see less than half of its membership reelected. The characteristic turmoil found in the "3rd Party Period, 1855-1896" stirred political party realignment in the North even in the midst of civil war. In this Congress, failure to gain nomination and loss at the general election together accounted for a Membership turnover of 25%.

== Major legislation ==
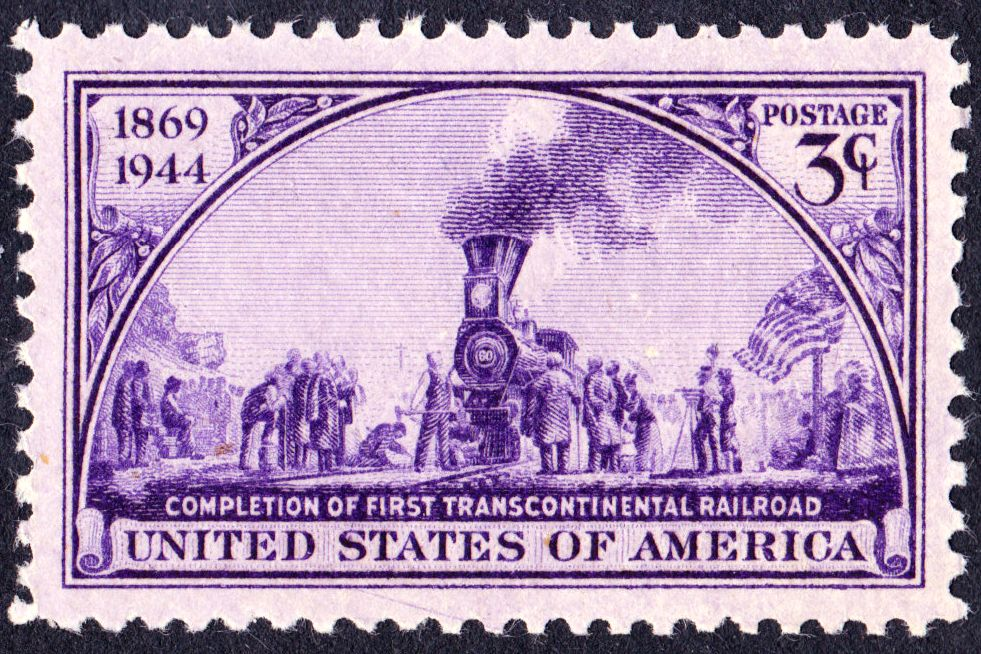
Transcontinental Railroad, by Act of Congress, July 1, 1861

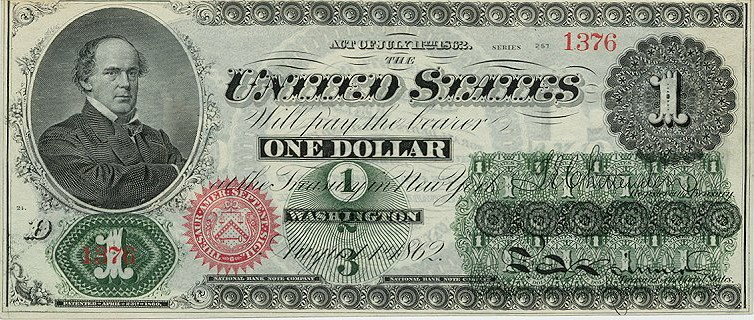
Greenback Dollar featuring U.S. Secretary of the Treasury Salmon Chase, "Act of July 11, 1862"

- August 5, 1861: Revenue Act of 1861, Sess. 1, ch. 45, 12 Stat. 292
- August 6, 1861: Confiscation Act of 1861, Sess. 1, ch. 60, 12 Stat. 319
- February 19, 1862: Anti-Coolie Act, Sess. 1, ch. 24, 27, 12 Stat. 340
- February 25, 1862: Legal Tender Act of 1862, Sess. 2, ch. 33, 12 Stat. 345
- April 16, 1862: District of Columbia Compensated Emancipation Act, Sess. 2, ch. 54, 12 Stat. 376
- May 15, 1862: An Act to Establish a Department of Agriculture, Sess. 2, ch. 72, 12 Stat. 387
- May 20, 1862: Homestead Act, Sess. 2, ch. 75, 12 Stat. 392
- May 20, 1862: Washington County Public Primary Schools Act ("An Act to provide for the Public Instruction of Youth in Primary Schools throughout the County of Washington, in the District of Columbia, without the Limits of the Cities of Washington and Georgetown"), Sess. 2, ch. 77, 12 Stat. 394
- May 21, 1862: Georgetown and Washington Cities Colored Children Education Act ("An Act providing for the Education of Colored Children in the Cities of Washington and Georgetown, District of Columbia, and for other Purposes"), Sess. 2, ch. 83, 12 Stat. 407
- June 19, 1862: An Act to secure Freedom to all persons within the Territories of the United States, Sess. 2, ch 111, 12 Stat. 432
- July 1, 1862: Morrill Anti-Bigamy Act, Sess. 2, ch. 126, 12 Stat. 501
- July 1, 1862: Revenue Act of 1862, Sess. 2, ch. 119, 12 Stat. 432
- July 1, 1862: Pacific Railway Act, Sess. 2, ch. 120, 12 Stat. 489
- July 2, 1862: Morrill Land Grant Colleges Act, Sess. 2, ch. 130, 12 Stat. 503
- July 11, 1862: Georgetown and Washington Cities Colored Children Schools Act ("An Act relating to Schools for the Education of Colored Children in the Cities of Washington and Georgetown, in the District of Columbia"), Sess. 2, ch. 151, 12 Stat. 537
- July 17, 1862: Militia Act of 1862, Sess. 2, ch. 201, 12 Stat. 597
- February 25, 1863: National Bank Act, Sess. 3, ch 58, 12 Stat. 665
- March 2, 1863: False Claims Act, Sess. 3, ch. 67, 12 Stat. 696
- March 3, 1863: Enrollment Act, Sess. 3, ch. 75, 12 Stat. 731
- March 3, 1863: Habeas Corpus Suspension Act, Sess. 3, ch. 81, 12 Stat. 755
- March 3, 1863: Tenth Circuit Act, 12 Stat. 794

== States admitted and territories organized ==
=== States admitted ===
- December 31, 1862: West Virginia admitted, Sess. 3, ch. 6, 12 Stat. 633, pending a presidential proclamation. (It became a state on June 20, 1863.)

=== Territories organized ===
- July 14, 1862: Nevada–Utah boundary line moved to the east, enlarging Nevada and reducing Utah in size, Sess. 2, ch. 12, 12 Stat. 575
- February 24, 1863: Arizona Territory organized, Sess. 3, ch. 56, 12 Stat. 664
- March 3, 1863: Idaho Territory organized, Sess. 3, ch. 117, 12 Stat. 808

== States in rebellion ==
Congress did not accept secession. Most of the Representatives and Senators from states that attempted to secede left Congress; those who took part in the rebellion were expelled.

- Secessions declared during previous Congress: South Carolina, Mississippi, Florida, Alabama, Georgia, Louisiana, and Texas.
  - Louisiana Congressional Districts LA 1 and 2, two of its four representatives remained seated in the 37th Congress.
- Secessions declared during this Congress:
  - April 17, 1861: Virginia (The pro-Union Restored Government of Virginia's two senators were seated, along with duly elected Representatives for VA 1, 7, 10, 11 and 12, five of its 13 representatives in the House.)
  - May 6, 1861: Arkansas
  - May 20, 1861: North Carolina
  - June 8, 1861: Tennessee (Sen. Andrew Johnson and three of the ten duly elected members of the House did not recognize secession and retained their seats in TN 2, 3 and 4.)

Although secessionist factions passed resolutions of secession in Missouri October 31, 1861, and in Kentucky November 20, 1861, their state delegations in the U.S. Congress remained in place, seven from Missouri and ten from Kentucky. Exile state governments resided with Confederate armies out-of-state, army-elected congressional representatives served as a solid pro-Jefferson Davis administration voting bloc in the Confederate Congress.

== Party summary ==
=== Senate ===
Senate at the beginning of the Congress

	Party (shading shows control)					Total	Vacant
	Constitutional Union (C)	Democratic (D)	Republican (R)	Unionist (U)	Know Nothing (KN)	Total	Vacant
End of previous congress	0	33	26	0	2	61	5
Begin	0	14	32	0	1	47	21
End	1	8	32	7	0	48	20
Final voting share	2.1%	16.7%	66.7%	14.6%	0.0%		
Beginning of next congress	0	9	36	5	0	50	20

=== House of Representatives ===
House of Representatives at the beginning of Congress

	Party (shading shows control)							Total	Vacant
	Constitutional Union (CU)	Democratic (D)	Independent Democratic (ID)	Republican (R)	Unionist (U)	Southern Rights (SR)	Other	Total	Vacant
End of previous congress	0	59	7	115	0	0	29 (Note: 17 Oppositionists, 7 Anti-Lecompton Democrats, 5 Know Nothings)	210	28
Begin	4	45	1	104	19	1	0	174	63
End	3	45	1	108	30	0	0	187	59
Final voting share	1.6%	24.1%	0.5%	57.8%	16.0%	0.0%	0.0%		
Beginning of next congress	0	74	0	98 (Note: Republican–Union)	9 (Note: Union Democratic)	0	3 (Note: 1 Conservative Unionist, 1 Independent Republican, 1 Unconditional Union Democrat)	184	58

== Leadership ==
=== Senate ===
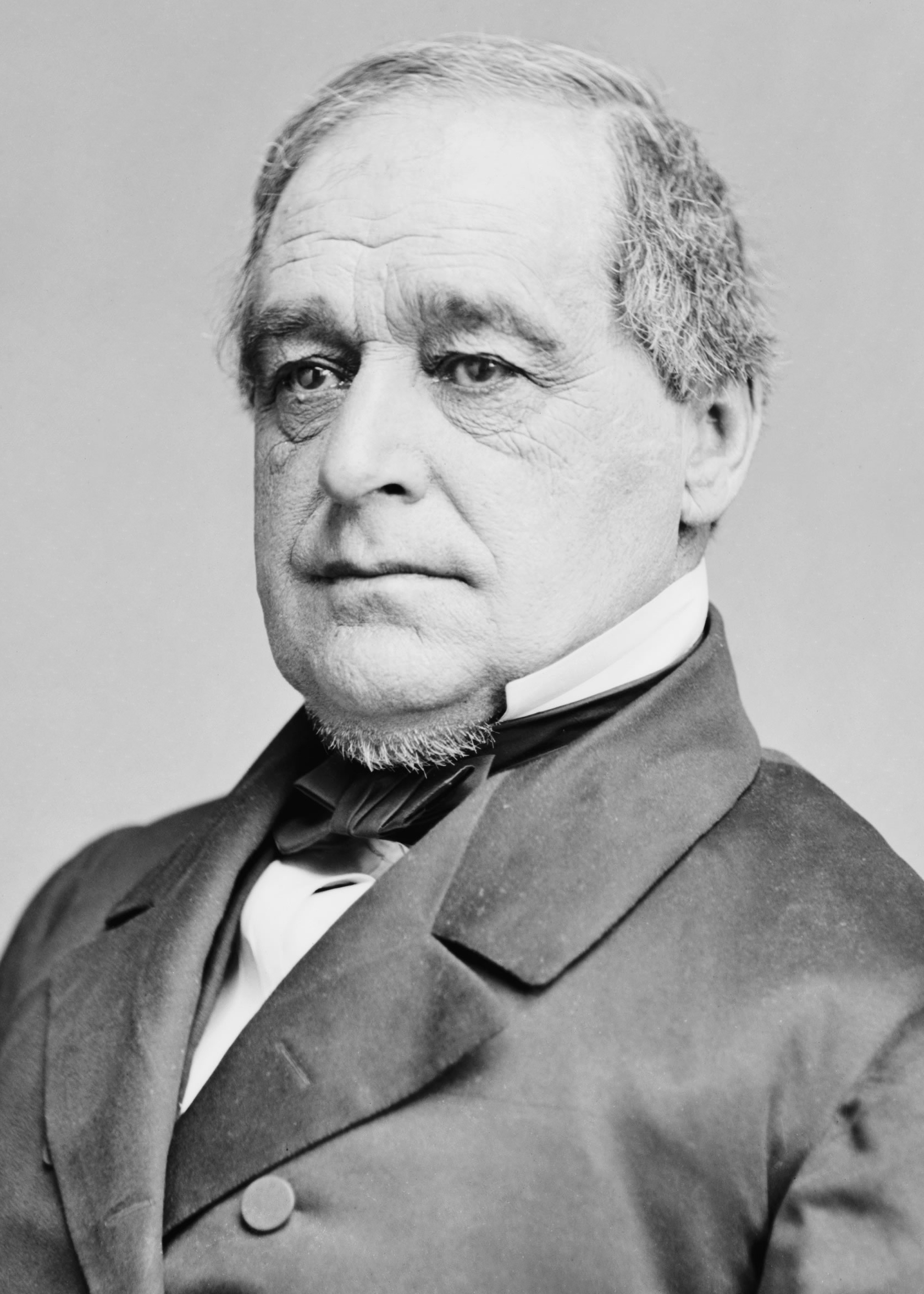
President of the Senate Hannibal Hamlin

- President: Hannibal Hamlin (R)
- President pro tempore: Solomon Foot (R)
- Republican Conference Chairman: John P. Hale

=== House of Representatives ===
- Speaker: Galusha A. Grow (R)

== Members ==
This list is arranged by chamber, then by state. Senators are listed by class, and representatives by district.

Skip to House of Representatives, below

=== Senate ===
Senators were elected by the state legislatures every two years, with one-third beginning new six-year terms with each Congress. Preceding the names in the list below are Senate class numbers, which indicate the cycle of their election. In this Congress, Class 1 meant their term ended with this Congress, facing re-election in 1862; Class 2 meant their term began in the last Congress, facing re-election in 1864; and Class 3 meant their term began in this Congress, facing re-election in 1866.

==== Alabama ====
2. Vacant
3. Vacant

==== Arkansas ====
▌2. William K. Sebastian (D), until July 11, 1861, vacant thereafter
▌3. Charles B. Mitchel (D), until July 11, 1861, vacant thereafter

==== California ====
▌1. Milton S. Latham (D)
▌3. James A. McDougall (D)

==== Connecticut ====
▌1. James Dixon (R)
▌3. Lafayette S. Foster (R)

==== Delaware ====
▌1. James A. Bayard Jr. (D)
▌2. Willard Saulsbury Sr. (D)

==== Florida ====
1. Vacant
3. Vacant

==== Georgia ====
2. Vacant
3. Vacant

==== Illinois ====
▌2. Stephen A. Douglas (D), until June 3, 1861

▌Orville H. Browning (R), June 26, 1861 – January 12, 1863
▌William A. Richardson (D), from January 12, 1863

▌3. Lyman Trumbull (R)

==== Indiana ====
▌1. Jesse D. Bright (D), until February 5, 1862

▌Joseph A. Wright (U), February 24, 1862 – January 14, 1863
▌David Turpie (D), from January 14, 1863

▌3. Henry S. Lane (R)

==== Iowa ====
▌2. James W. Grimes (R)
▌3. James Harlan (R)

==== Kansas ====
▌2. Jim Lane (R), from April 4, 1861
▌3. Samuel C. Pomeroy (R), from April 4, 1861

==== Kentucky ====
▌2. Lazarus W. Powell (D)
▌3. John C. Breckinridge (D), until December 4, 1861

▌Garrett Davis (U), from December 23, 1861

==== Louisiana ====
2. Vacant
3. Vacant

==== Maine ====
▌1. Lot M. Morrill (R)
▌2. William P. Fessenden (R)

==== Maryland ====
▌▌1. Anthony Kennedy (KN (Note: Switched to Union during the Congress.))
▌3. James Pearce (D), until December 20, 1862

▌Thomas H. Hicks (U), from December 29, 1862

==== Massachusetts ====
▌1. Charles Sumner (R)
▌2. Henry Wilson (R)

==== Michigan ====
▌1. Zachariah Chandler (R)
▌2. Kinsley S. Bingham (R), until October 5, 1861

▌Jacob M. Howard (R), from January 17, 1862

==== Minnesota ====
▌1. Henry M. Rice (D)
▌2. Morton S. Wilkinson (R)

==== Mississippi ====
1. Vacant
2. Vacant

==== Missouri ====
▌1. Trusten Polk (D), until January 10, 1862

▌John B. Henderson (U), from January 17, 1862

▌3. Waldo P. Johnson (D), March 17, 1861 – January 10, 1862

▌Robert Wilson (U), from January 17, 1862

==== New Hampshire ====
▌2. John P. Hale (R)
▌3. Daniel Clark (R)

==== New Jersey ====
▌1. John R. Thomson (D), until September 12, 1862

▌Richard S. Field (U), November 21, 1862 – January 14, 1863
▌James W. Wall (D), from January 14, 1863

▌2. John C. Ten Eyck (R)

==== New York ====
▌1. Preston King (R)
▌3. Ira Harris (R)

==== North Carolina ====
▌2. Thomas Bragg (D), until March 6, 1861, vacant thereafter
▌3. Thomas L. Clingman (D), until March 28, 1861, vacant thereafter

==== Ohio ====
▌1. Benjamin F. Wade (R)
▌3. Salmon P. Chase (R), until March 7, 1861

▌John Sherman (R), from March 21, 1861

==== Oregon ====
▌2. Edward D. Baker (R), until October 21, 1861

▌Benjamin Stark (D), October 29, 1861 – September 12, 1862
▌Benjamin F. Harding (U), from September 12, 1862

▌3. James W. Nesmith (D)

==== Pennsylvania ====
▌1. Simon Cameron (R), until March 4, 1861

▌David Wilmot (R), from March 14, 1861

▌3. Edgar Cowan (R)

==== Rhode Island ====
▌1. James F. Simmons (R), until August 15, 1862

▌Samuel G. Arnold (CU), from December 1, 1862

▌2. Henry B. Anthony (R)

==== South Carolina ====
2. Vacant
3. Vacant

==== Tennessee ====
▌1. Andrew Johnson (D), until March 4, 1862, vacant thereafter
2. Vacant

==== Texas ====
▌1. Louis Wigfall (D), until March 23, 1861, vacant thereafter
▌2. John Hemphill (D), until July 11, 1861, vacant thereafter

==== Vermont ====
▌1. Solomon Foot (R)
▌3. Jacob Collamer (R)

==== Virginia ====
▌1. James M. Mason (D), until March 28, 1861

▌Waitman T. Willey (U), from July 9, 1861

▌2. Robert M. T. Hunter (D), until March 28, 1861

▌John S. Carlile (U), from July 9, 1861

==== Wisconsin ====
▌1. James R. Doolittle (R)
▌3. Timothy O. Howe (R)

Senators' party membership by state at the opening of the 37th Congress in March 1861. The green stripes in Maryland represent Unionist Anthony Kennedy. The senators from Kansas were not seated until April 4, 1861. 2 Democrats 1 Democrat and 1 Republican 2 Republicans Vacant

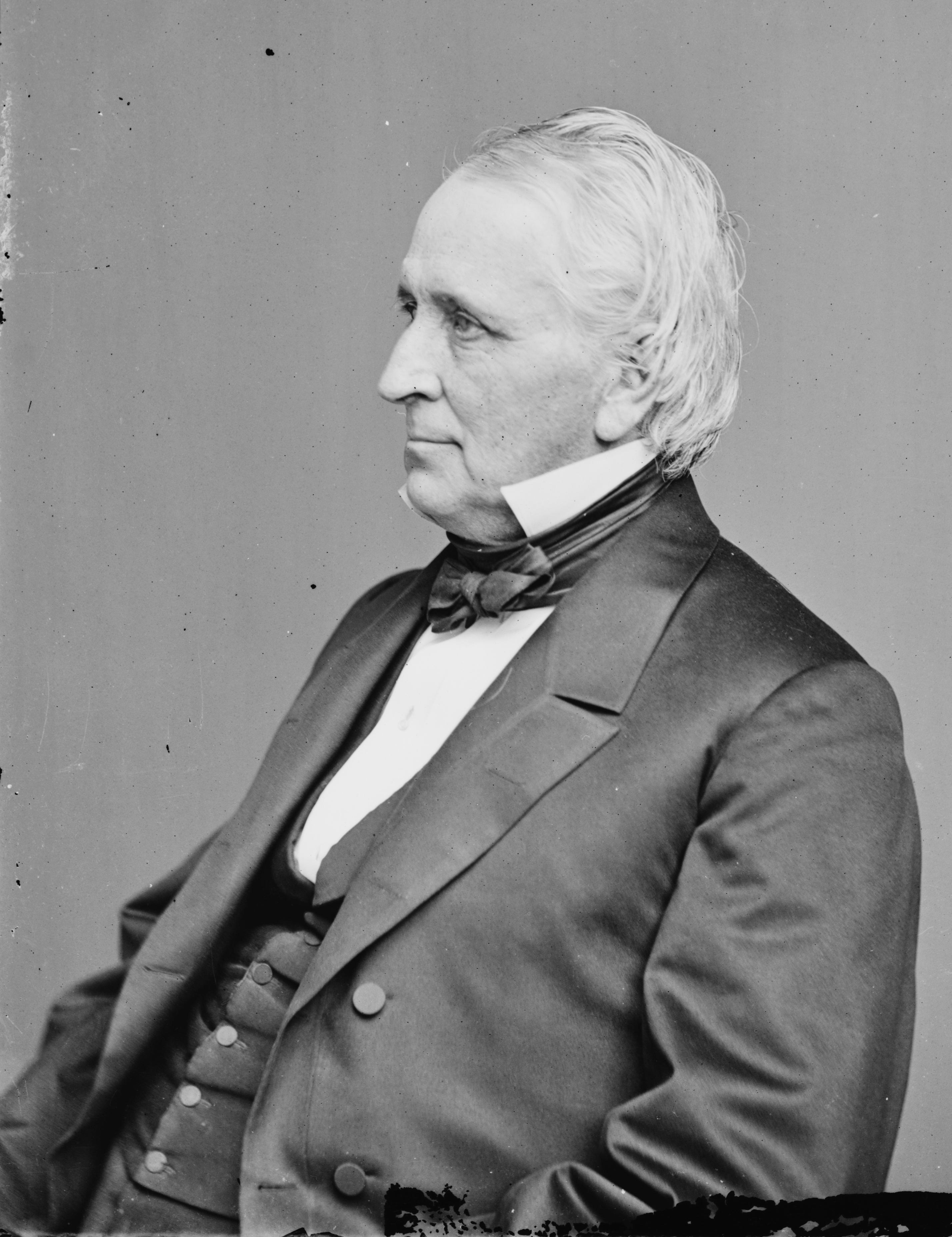
President pro tempore Solomon Foot

=== House of Representatives ===
Representatives are listed by their districts.

==== Alabama ====
1. Vacant
2. Vacant
3. Vacant
4. Vacant
5. Vacant
6. Vacant
7. Vacant

==== Arkansas ====
1. Vacant
2. Vacant

==== California ====
All representatives were elected statewide on a general ticket.

▌At-large. Frederick F. Low (R), from June 3, 1862
▌At-large. Timothy G. Phelps (R)
▌At-large. Aaron A. Sargent (R)

==== Connecticut ====
▌1. Dwight Loomis (R)
▌2. James E. English (D)
▌3. Alfred A. Burnham (R)
▌4. George Catlin Woodruff (D)

==== Delaware ====
▌At-large. George P. Fisher (U)

==== Florida ====
At-large. Vacant

==== Georgia ====
1. Vacant
2. Vacant
3. Vacant
4. Vacant
5. Vacant
6. Vacant
7. Vacant
8. Vacant

==== Illinois ====
▌1. Elihu B. Washburne (R)
▌2. Isaac N. Arnold (R)
▌3. Owen Lovejoy (R)
▌4. William Kellogg (R)
▌5. William A. Richardson (D), until January 29, 1863, vacant thereafter
▌6. John A. McClernand (D), until October 28, 1861

▌Anthony L. Knapp (D), from December 12, 1861

▌7. James C. Robinson (D)
▌8. Philip B. Fouke (D)
▌9. John A. Logan (D), until April 2, 1862

▌William J. Allen (D), from June 2, 1862

==== Indiana ====
▌1. John Law (D)
▌2. James A. Cravens (D)
▌3. William McKee Dunn (R)
▌4. William S. Holman (D)
▌5. George W. Julian (R)
▌6. Albert G. Porter (R)
▌7. Daniel W. Voorhees (D)
▌8. Albert Smith White (R)
▌9. Schuyler Colfax (R)
▌10. William Mitchell (R)
▌11. John P. C. Shanks (R)

==== Iowa ====
▌1. Samuel Curtis (R), until August 4, 1861

▌James F. Wilson (R), from October 8, 1861

▌2. William Vandever (R)

==== Kansas ====
▌At-large. Martin F. Conway (R)

==== Kentucky ====
▌1. Henry C. Burnett (SR), until December 3, 1861

▌Samuel L. Casey (U), from March 10, 1862

▌2. James S. Jackson (U), until December 13, 1861

▌George H. Yeaman (U), from December 1, 1862

▌3. Henry Grider (U)
▌4. Aaron Harding (U)
▌5. Charles A. Wickliffe (U)
▌6. George W. Dunlap (U)
▌7. Robert Mallory (U)
▌8. John J. Crittenden (U)
▌9. William H. Wadsworth (U)
▌10. John W. Menzies (U)

==== Louisiana ====
▌1. Benjamin F. Flanders (U), from December 3, 1862
▌2. Michael Hahn (U), from December 3, 1862
3. Vacant
4. Vacant

==== Maine ====
▌1. John N. Goodwin (R)
▌2. Charles W. Walton (R), until May 26, 1862

▌Thomas A. D. Fessenden (R), from December 1, 1862

▌3. Samuel C. Fessenden (R)
▌4. Anson P. Morrill (R)
▌5. John H. Rice (R)
▌6. Frederick A. Pike (R)

==== Maryland ====
▌1. John W. Crisfield (U)
▌2. Edwin H. Webster (U)
▌3. Cornelius L. L. Leary (U)
▌4. Henry May (U)
▌5. Francis Thomas (U)
▌6. Charles B. Calvert (U)

==== Massachusetts ====
▌1. Thomas D. Eliot (R)
▌2. James Buffington (R)
▌3. Charles F. Adams Sr. (R), until May 1, 1861

▌Benjamin Thomas (U), from June 11, 1861

▌4. Alexander H. Rice (R)
▌5. William Appleton (CU), until September 27, 1861

▌Samuel Hooper (R), from December 2, 1861

▌6. John B. Alley (R)
▌7. Daniel W. Gooch (R)
▌8. Charles R. Train (R)
▌9. Goldsmith F. Bailey (R), until May 8, 1862

▌Amasa Walker (R), from December 1, 1862

▌10. Charles Delano (R)
▌11. Henry L. Dawes (R)

==== Michigan ====
▌1. Bradley F. Granger (R)
▌2. Fernando C. Beaman (R)
▌3. Francis W. Kellogg (R)
▌4. Rowland E. Trowbridge (R)

==== Minnesota ====
Both representatives were elected statewide on a general ticket.

▌At-large. Cyrus Aldrich (R)
▌At-large. William Windom (R)

==== Mississippi ====
1. Vacant
2. Vacant
3. Vacant
4. Vacant
5. Vacant

==== Missouri ====
▌1. Francis P. Blair Jr. (R)
▌2. James S. Rollins (CU)
▌3. John B. Clark (D), until July 13, 1861

▌William A. Hall (D), from January 20, 1862

▌4. Elijah H. Norton (D)
▌5. John W. Reid (D), until August 3, 1861

▌Thomas L. Price (D), from January 21, 1862

▌6. John S. Phelps (D)
▌7. John W. Noell (D)

==== New Hampshire ====
▌1. Gilman Marston (R)
▌2. Edward H. Rollins (R)
▌3. Thomas M. Edwards (R)

==== New Jersey ====
▌1. John T. Nixon (R)
▌2. John L. N. Stratton (R)
▌3. William G. Steele (D)
▌4. George T. Cobb (D)
▌5. Nehemiah Perry (D)

==== New York ====
▌1. Edward H. Smith (D)
▌2. Moses F. Odell (D)
▌3. Benjamin Wood (D)
▌4. James E. Kerrigan (ID)
▌5. William Wall (R)
▌6. Frederick A. Conkling (R)
▌7. Elijah Ward (D)
▌8. Isaac C. Delaplaine (D)
▌9. Edward Haight (D)
▌10. Charles H. Van Wyck (R)
▌11. John B. Steele (D)
▌12. Stephen Baker (R)
▌13. Abram B. Olin (R)
▌14. Erastus Corning (D)
▌15. James B. McKean (R)
▌16. William A. Wheeler (R)
▌17. Socrates N. Sherman (R)
▌18. Chauncey Vibbard (D)
▌19. Richard Franchot (R)
▌20. Roscoe Conkling (R)
▌21. R. Holland Duell (R)
▌22. William E. Lansing (R)
▌23. Ambrose W. Clark (R)
▌24. Charles B. Sedgwick (R)
▌25. Theodore M. Pomeroy (R)
▌26. Jacob P. Chamberlain (R)
▌27. Alexander S. Diven (R)
▌28. Robert B. Van Valkenburgh (R)
▌29. Alfred Ely (R)
▌30. Augustus Frank (R)
▌31. Burt Van Horn (R)
▌32. Elbridge G. Spaulding (R)
▌33. Reuben Fenton (R)

==== North Carolina ====
1. Vacant
2. Vacant
3. Vacant
4. Vacant
5. Vacant
6. Vacant
7. Vacant
8. Vacant

==== Ohio ====
▌1. George H. Pendleton (D)
▌2. John A. Gurley (R)
▌3. Clement Vallandigham (D)
▌4. William Allen (D)
▌5. James M. Ashley (R)
▌6. Chilton A. White (D)
▌7. Thomas Corwin (R), until March 12, 1861

▌Richard A. Harrison (U), from July 4, 1861

▌8. Samuel Shellabarger (R)
▌9. Warren P. Noble (D)
▌10. Carey A. Trimble (R)
▌11. Valentine B. Horton (R)
▌12. Samuel S. Cox (D)
▌13. John Sherman (R), until March 21, 1861

▌Samuel T. Worcester (R), from July 4, 1861

▌14. Harrison G. O. Blake (R)
▌15. Robert H. Nugen (D)
▌16. William P. Cutler (R)
▌17. James R. Morris (D)
▌18. Sidney Edgerton (R)
▌19. Albert G. Riddle (R)
▌20. John Hutchins (R)
▌21. John Bingham (R)

==== Oregon ====
▌At-large. Andrew J. Thayer (D), until July 30, 1861

▌George K. Shiel (D), from July 30, 1861

==== Pennsylvania ====
▌1. William E. Lehman (D)
▌2. Edward Joy Morris (R), until June 8, 1861

▌Charles J. Biddle (D), from July 2, 1861

▌3. John P. Verree (R)
▌4. William D. Kelley (R)
▌5. William Morris Davis (R)
▌6. John Hickman (R)
▌7. Thomas B. Cooper (D), until April 4, 1862

▌John D. Stiles (D), from June 3, 1862

▌8. Sydenham E. Ancona (D)
▌9. Thaddeus Stevens (R)
▌10. John W. Killinger (R)
▌11. James H. Campbell (R)
▌12. George W. Scranton (R), until March 24, 1861

▌Hendrick B. Wright (D), from July 4, 1861

▌13. Philip Johnson (D)
▌14. Galusha A. Grow (R)
▌15. James T. Hale (R)
▌16. Joseph Bailey (D)
▌17. Edward McPherson (R)
▌18. Samuel S. Blair (R)
▌19. John Covode (R)
▌20. Jesse Lazear (D)
▌21. James K. Moorhead (R)
▌22. Robert McKnight (R)
▌23. John W. Wallace (R)
▌24. John Patton (R)
▌25. Elijah Babbitt (R)

==== Rhode Island ====
▌1. William P. Sheffield (CU)
▌2. George H. Browne (CU)

==== South Carolina ====
1. Vacant
2. Vacant
3. Vacant
4. Vacant
5. Vacant
6. Vacant

==== Tennessee ====
1. Vacant
▌2. Horace Maynard (U)
▌3. George W. Bridges (U), from February 25, 1863
▌4. Andrew J. Clements (U)
5. Vacant
6. Vacant
7. Vacant
8. Vacant
9. Vacant
10. Vacant

==== Texas ====
1. Vacant
2. Vacant

==== Vermont ====
▌1. Eliakim P. Walton (R)
▌2. Justin S. Morrill (R)
▌3. Portus Baxter (R)

==== Virginia ====
▌1. Joseph E. Segar (U), from May 6, 1862
2. Vacant
3. Vacant
4. Vacant
5. Vacant
6. Vacant
▌7. Charles H. Upton (U), July 4, 1861 – February 27, 1862

▌Lewis McKenzie (U), from February 16, 1863

8. Vacant
9. Vacant
▌10. William G. Brown Sr. (U)
▌11. John S. Carlile (U), until July 9, 1861

▌Jacob B. Blair (U), from December 2, 1861

▌12. Kellian Whaley (U)
13. Vacant

==== Wisconsin ====
▌1. John F. Potter (R)
▌2. Luther Hanchett (R), until November 24, 1862

▌Walter D. McIndoe (R), from January 26, 1863

▌3. A. Scott Sloan (R)

==== Non-voting members ====
▌Colorado Territory. Hiram P. Bennet (R), from August 19, 1861
▌Dakota Territory. John B. S. Todd (D), from December 9, 1861
▌Nebraska Territory. Samuel G. Daily (R)
▌Nevada Territory. John Cradlebaugh (I), from December 2, 1861
▌New Mexico Territory. John S. Watts (R)
▌Utah Territory. John M. Bernhisel (I)
▌Washington Territory. William H. Wallace (R)

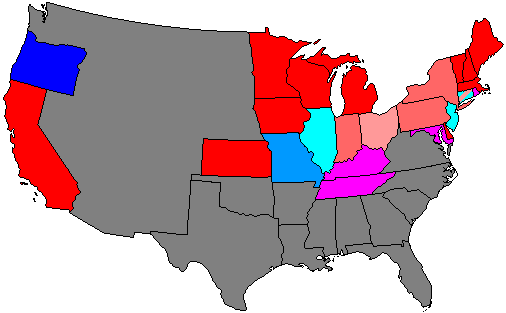
House seats by party holding plurality in state: 80%+ Democratic / 80%+ Republican; 60+ to 80% Democratic / 60+ to 80% Republican; Up to 60% Democratic / Up to 60% Republican; 80%+ Unionist

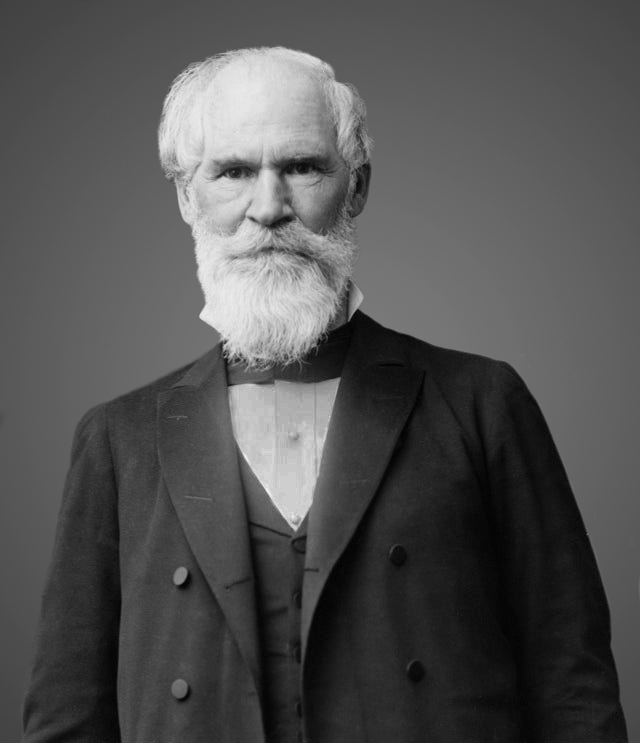
Speaker of the House Galusha A. Grow

== Changes in membership ==
The count below reflects changes from the beginning of this Congress.

=== Senate ===
Senate changes
State (class)	Vacated by	Reason for change	Successor	Date of successor's formal installation (Note: When seated or oath administered, not necessarily when service began.)
Missouri (3)	Vacant	Did not take seat until after Congress commenced.	Waldo P. Johnson (D)	March 17, 1861
Kansas (2)	Vacant	Election not recognized by US Senate.	Jim Lane (R)	April 4, 1861
Kansas (3)	Vacant	Election not recognized by the Senate.	Samuel C. Pomeroy (R)	April 4, 1861
Pennsylvania (1)	Simon Cameron (R)	Resigned March 4, 1861, to become Secretary of War. Successor was elected.	David Wilmot (R)	March 14, 1861
North Carolina (2)	Thomas Bragg (D)	Withdrew March 6, 1861; expelled later in 1861.	Vacant thereafter	
Ohio (3)	Salmon P. Chase (R)	Resigned March 7, 1861, to become Secretary of the Treasury. Successor was elected.	John Sherman (R)	March 21, 1861
Texas (1)	Louis T. Wigfall (D)	Withdrew March 23, 1861.	Vacant thereafter	
North Carolina (3)	Thomas L. Clingman (D)	Withdrew March 28, 1861; expelled later in 1861.	Vacant thereafter	
Virginia (2)	Robert M. T. Hunter (D)	Withdrew March 28, 1861, and later expelled for support of the rebellion. Successor was elected.	John S. Carlile (U)	July 9, 1861
Virginia (1)	James M. Mason (D)	Expelled March 28, 1861, for supporting the rebellion. Successor was elected.	Waitman T. Willey (U)	July 9, 1861
Illinois (2)	Stephen A. Douglas (D)	Died June 3, 1861. Successor was appointed.	Orville H. Browning (R)	June 26, 1861
Texas (2)	John Hemphill (D)	Expelled sometime in July 1861.	Vacant thereafter	
Illinois (2)	Orville H. Browning (R)	Interim appointee lost election to finish the term. Successor elected January 12, 1863.	William A. Richardson (D)	January 30, 1863
Arkansas (2)	William K. Sebastian (D)	Expelled July 11, 1861.	Vacant thereafter	
Arkansas (3)	Charles B. Mitchel (D)	Expelled July 11, 1861.	Vacant thereafter	
Michigan (2)	Kinsley S. Bingham (R)	Died October 5, 1861. Successor was elected.	Jacob M. Howard (R)	January 17, 1862
Oregon (2)	Edward D. Baker (R)	Killed at Battle of Ball's Bluff October 21, 1861. Successor was appointed.	Benjamin Stark (D)	October 29, 1861
Kentucky (3)	John C. Breckinridge (D)	Expelled December 4, 1861, for supporting the rebellion. Successor was elected.	Garrett Davis (U)	December 23, 1861
Missouri (1)	Trusten Polk (D)	Expelled January 10, 1862, for supporting the rebellion. Successor was appointed.	John B. Henderson (U)	January 17, 1862
Missouri (3)	Waldo P. Johnson (D)	Expelled January 10, 1862, for disloyalty to the government. Successor was appointed.	Robert Wilson (U)	January 17, 1862
Indiana (1)	Jesse D. Bright (D)	Expelled February 5, 1862, on charges of disloyalty. Successor was appointed.	Joseph A. Wright (U)	February 24, 1862
Tennessee (1)	Andrew Johnson (D)	Resigned March 4, 1862.	Vacant thereafter	
Rhode Island (1)	James F. Simmons (R)	Resigned August 15, 1862. Successor was elected.	Samuel G. Arnold (CU)	December 1, 1862
New Jersey (1)	John R. Thomson (D)	Died September 12, 1862. Successor was appointed.	Richard S. Field (R)	November 21, 1862
Oregon (2)	Benjamin Stark (D)	Retired September 12, 1862, upon election of a successor.	Benjamin F. Harding (U)	September 12, 1862
Maryland (3)	James Pearce (D)	Died December 20, 1862. Successor was appointed.	Thomas H. Hicks (U)	December 29, 1862
Indiana (1)	Joseph A. Wright (U)	Retired January 14, 1863, upon election of a successor.	David Turpie (D)	January 14, 1863
New Jersey (1)	Richard S. Field (R)	Retired January 14, 1863, upon election of a successor.	James W. Wall (D)	January 14, 1863

=== House of Representatives ===
House changes
District	Vacated by	Reason for change	Successor	Date of successor's formal installation
Colorado Territory at-large	New seat.		Hiram P. Bennett (Conservative R)	August 19, 1861
Nevada Territory at-large	New seat.		John Cradlebaugh (I)	December 2, 1861
Dakota Territory at-large	New seat.		John B. S. Todd (D)	December 9, 1861
Louisiana 1	Vacant.		Benjamin F. Flanders (U)	December 3, 1862
Louisiana 2	Vacant.		Michael Hahn (U)	December 3, 1862
Tennessee 3	Vacant	Representative-elect George W. Bridges was arrested by Confederate troops while en route to Washington, D.C., and held prisoner before he escaped.	George W. Bridges (U)	February 25, 1863
Virginia 1	Vacant.		Joseph E. Segar (U)	May 6, 1862
California at-large	Vacant	Low not permitted to take seat, qualified later under special act of Congress, 12 Stat. 411	Frederick F. Low (R)	June 3, 1862
Virginia 7	Vacant.		Charles H. Upton (U)	July 4, 1861
Ohio 7	Thomas Corwin (R)	Resigned March 12, 1861, to become Minister to Mexico.	Richard A. Harrison (U)	July 4, 1861
Ohio 13	John Sherman (R)	Resigned March 12, 1861, when elected U.S. Senator.	Samuel T. Worcester (R)	July 4, 1861
Pennsylvania 12	George W. Scranton (R)	Died March 24, 1861.	Hendrick B. Wright (D)	July 4, 1861
Massachusetts 3	Charles F. Adams Sr. (R)	Resigned May 1, 1861, to become Ambassador to Great Britain.	Benjamin Thomas (U)	June 11, 1861
Pennsylvania 2	Edward Joy Morris (R)	Resigned June 8, 1861, to become Minister Resident to Turkey.	Charles J. Biddle (D)	July 2, 1861
Virginia 11	John S. Carlile (U)	Resigned July 9, 1861, to become United States Senator from the loyal faction of Virginia.	Jacob B. Blair (U)	December 2, 1861
Missouri 3	John Bullock Clark (D)	Expelled July 13, 1861, for having taken up arms against the Union.	William A. Hall (D)	January 20, 1862
Oregon at-large	Andrew J. Thayer (D)	Election was successfully contested July 30, 1861.	George K. Shiel (D)	July 30, 1861
Missouri 5	John W. Reid (D)	Withdrew August 3, 1861, and then expelled December 2, 1861, for having taken up arms against the Union.	Thomas L. Price (D)	January 21, 1862
Iowa 1	Samuel Curtis (R)	Resigned August 4, 1861, to become colonel of the 2nd Iowa Infantry.	James F. Wilson (R)	October 8, 1861
Massachusetts 5	William Appleton (CU)	Resigned September 27, 1861, due to failing health.	Samuel Hooper (R)	December 2, 1861
Illinois 6	John A. McClernand (D)	Resigned October 28, 1861, to accept a commission as brigadier general of volunteers for service in the Civil War.	Anthony L. Knapp (D)	December 12, 1861
Kentucky 1	Henry C. Burnett (D)	Expelled December 3, 1861, for support of secession.	Samuel L. Casey (U)	March 10, 1862
Kentucky 2	James S. Jackson (U)	Resigned December 13, 1861, to enter the Union Army.	George H. Yeaman (U)	December 1, 1862
Virginia 7	Charles H. Upton (U)	Declared not entitled to seat February 27, 1862.	Lewis McKenzie (U)	February 16, 1863
Illinois 9	John A. Logan (D)	Resigned April 2, 1862, to enter the Union Army.	William J. Allen (D)	June 2, 1862
Pennsylvania 7	Thomas B. Cooper (D)	Died April 4, 1862.	John D. Stiles (D)	June 3, 1862
Massachusetts 9	Goldsmith F. Bailey (R)	Died May 8, 1862.	Amasa Walker (R)	December 1, 1862
Maine 2	Charles W. Walton (R)	Resigned May 26, 1862, to become associate justice of the Maine Supreme Judicial Court.	Thomas A. D. Fessenden (R)	December 1, 1862
Wisconsin 2	Luther Hanchett (R)	Died November 24, 1862.	Walter D. McIndoe (R)	January 26, 1863
Illinois 5	William A. Richardson (D)	Resigned January 29, 1863, after being elected to the U.S. Senate.	Vacant thereafter	

== Committees ==
=== Senate ===
Standing committees of the Senate resolved, Friday, March 8, 1861

==== Foreign Relations ====
- Charles Sumner (R-Massachusetts) (chairman)
- Jacob Collamer (R-Vermont)
- James Rood Doolittle (R-Wisconsin)
- Ira Harris (R-New York)
- Stephen A. Douglas (D-Illinois)
- Trusten Polk (D-Missouri)
- John C. Breckinridge (D-Kentucky)

==== Finance ====
- William P. Fessenden (R-Maine) (chairman)
- James F. Simmons (R-Rhode Island)
- Jacob Collamer (R-Vermont)
- Benjamin F. Wade (R-Massachusetts)
- Timothy O. Howe (R-Wisconsin)
- John Sherman (R-Ohio)
- Robert M. T. Hunter (D-Virginia)
- James Pearce (D-Maryland)
- Jesse D. Bright (D-Indiana)

==== Commerce ====
- Zachariah Chandler (R-Michigan) (chairman)
- Preston King (R-New York)
- Lot Morrill (R-Maine)
- Henry Wilson (R-Massachusetts)
- Thomas L. Clingman (D-North Carolina)
- Samuel G. Arnold (R-Rhode Island)
- Willard Saulsbury Jr. (D-North Carolina)
- Andrew Johnson (D-Tennsessee)

==== Military Affairs and Militia ====
- Henry Wilson (R-Massachusetts) (chairman)
- Preston King (R-New York)
- Edward D. Baker (R-Oregon)
- Henry S. Lane (R-Indiana)
- Jim Lane (R-Kansas)
- Henry M. Rice (R-Minnesota)
- Milton S. Latham (D-California)
- John C. Breckinridge (D-Kentucky)
- Jacob M. Howard (R-Michigan)

==== Naval Affairs ====
- John P. Hale (R-New Hampshire) (chairman)
- James W. Grimes (R-Iowa)
- Solomon Foot (R-Vermont)
- Edgar Cowan (R-New Hampshire)
- John Renshaw Thomson (R-New Jersey)
- Anthony Kennedy (UU-Maryland)
- Richard Stockton Field (R-New Jersey)
- John Sherman (R-Ohio)

==== Judiciary ====
- Lyman Trumbull (R-Ohio) (chairman)
- Lafayette S. Foster (R-Connecticut)
- John C. Ten Eyck (R-New Jersey)
- Jacob M. Howard (R-Michigan)
- Ira Harris (R-New York)
- Edgar Cowan (R-Pennsylvania)
- James A. Bayard Jr. (D-Delaware)
- Lazarus W. Powell (D-Kentucky)
- Thomas L. Clingman (D-North Carolina)

==== Post Offices and Post Roads ====
- Jacob Collamer (R-Vermont) (chairman)
- James Dixon (R-Connecticut)
- Benjamin Wade (R-Connecticut)
- Lyman Trumbull (R-Illinois)
- Henry M. Rice (D-Minnesota)
- Jesse D. Bright (D-Indiana)
- Milton S. Latham (D-California)

==== Public Lands ====
- James Harlan (R-Iowa) (chairman)
- Kinsley S. Bingham (R-Michigan)
- Daniel Clark (R-New Hampshire)
- Morton S. Wilkinson (R-Minnesota)
- Andrew Johnson (D-Tennsessee)
- Joseph A. Wright (U-Indiana)
- Benjamin F. Harding (D-Oregon)
- Thomas Bragg (D-North Carolina)
- Samuel C. Pomeroy (R-Kansas)
- John S. Carlile (UU-Virginia)

==== Private Land Claims ====
- Ira Harris (R-New York) (chairman)
- John C. Ten Eyck (R-New York)
- Charles Sumner (R-New York)
- Trusten Polk (D-Missouri)
- James A. Bayard Jr. (D-Delaware)
- Henry M. Rice (D-Minnesota)
- Daniel Clark (R-New Hampshire)

==== Indian Affairs ====
- James Rood Doolittle (R-Wisconsin) (chairman)
- Edward D. Baker (D-Oregon)
- Edgar Cowan (D-Pennsylvania)
- John C. Ten Eyck (R-New Jersey)
- William K. Sebastian (D-Arkansas)
- Henry M. Rice (D-Minnesota)
- James W. Nesmith (D-Oregon)

==== Pensions ====
- Lafayette S. Foster (R-Michigan) (chairman)
- Kinsley S. Bingham (R-Minnesota)
- Henry S. Lane (R-Indiana)
- James F. Simmons (R-Rhode Island)
- Willard Saulsbury Sr. (D-Delaware)
- Samuel C. Pomeroy (R-Kansas)
- Waitman T. Willey (UU-Virginia)

==== Revolutionary Claims ====
- Preston King (R-New York) (chairman)
- Zachariah Chandler (R-Michigan)
- Morton S. Wilkinson (D-Minnesota)
- John P. Hale (R-New Hampshire)
- James W. Nesmith (D-Oregon)

==== Claims ====
- Daniel Clark (R-New Hampshire) (chairman)
- James F. Simmons (R-Rhode Island)
- Timothy O. Howe (R-Wisconsin)
- Edgar Cowan (R-Pennsylvania)
- Thomas Bragg (D-North Carolina)
- Trusten Polk (D-Missouri)
- Samuel C. Pomeroy (R-Kansas)
- Richard Stockton Field (R-New Jersey)
- David Wilmot (R-Pennsylvania)
- Milton S. Latham (D-California)

==== District of Columbia ====
- James W. Grimes (R-Iowa) (chairman)
- Henry B. Anthony (R-Rhode Island)
- Lot Morrill (R-Maine)
- Benjamin F. Wade (R-Ohio)
- Anthony Kennedy (UU-Maryland)
- Thomas L. Clingman (D-North Carolina)
- John B. Henderson (D-Missouri)

==== Patents and Patent Office ====
- James F. Simmons (R-Rhode Island) (chairman)
- Charles Sumner (R-Massachusetts)
- James Rood Doolittle (R-Wisconsin)
- Edgar Cowan (R-Pennsylvania)
- John R. Thomson (D-New Jersey)
- William K. Sebastian (D-Arkansas)
- Willard Saulsbury Sr. (D-Delaware)
- Richard Stockton Field (R-New Jersey)

==== Public Buildings and Grounds ====
- Solomon Foot (R-Vermont) (chairman)
- James Dixon (R-Connecticut)
- Zachariah Chandler (R-Michigan)
- Jesse D. Bright (D-Indiana)
- Anthony Kennedy (UU-Maryland)
- John B. Henderson (D-Missouri)

==== Territories ====
- James Mitchell Ashley (R-Ohio) (chairman)
- Morton S. Wilkinson (R-Minnesota)
- Edgar Cowan (R-Pennsylvania)
- John P. Hale (R-New Hampshire)
- Stephen A. Douglas (D-Illinois)
- William K. Sebastian (D-Arkansas)
- Thomas Bragg (D-North Carolina)
- John S. Carlile (UU-Virginia)
- Orville Hickman Browning (R-Illinois)
- Andrew Johnson (D-Tennessee)
- Samuel C. Pomeroy (R-Kansas)

==== Audit and Control the Contingent Expenses of the Senate ====
- James Dixon (R-Connecticut) (chairman)
- Daniel Clark (R-New Hampshire)
- Andrew Johnson (D-Tennessee)
- Benjamin F. Harding (D-Oregon)

==== Printing ====
- Henry B. Anthony (R-Rhode Island) (chairman)
- James Harlan (R-Iowa)
- Lazarus W. Powell (D-Kentucky)

==== Engrossed Bills ====
- Jim Lane (R-Kansas) (chairman)
- Lot Morrill (R-Maryland)
- Samuel G. Arnold (R-Rhode Island)
- Charles B. Mitchel (D-Arkansas)

==== Enrolled Bills ====
- Kinsley S. Bingham (R-Michigan) (chairman)
- Edward D. Baker (R-Oregon)
- Waitman T. Willey (UU-Virginia)
- Willard Saulsbury Sr. (D-Delaware)

==== The Library ====
- James Pearce (D-Maryland) (chairman)
- Jacob Collamer (R-Vermont)
- William P. Fessenden (R-Maine)

==== Order in the Galleries (Select) ====
- Henry B. Anthony (R-Rhode Island)
- James Murray Mason (D-Virginia)
- Benjamin F. Wade (R-Ohio)

=== House of Representatives ===
Members by committee assignments, Congressional Globe, as published July 8, 1861. Spellings conform to those found in the Congressional Biographical Dictionary.

Unless otherwise noted, all committees listed are Standing, as found at the Library of Congress

==== Accounts ====
- James Buffinton (R-Massachusetts) (chairman)
- Edward H. Rollins (R-New Hampshire)
- William E. Lehman (D-Pennsylvania)
- Samuel T. Worcester (R-Ohio)
- George W. Dunlap (UU-Kentucky)

==== Agriculture ====
- Owen Lovejoy (R-Illinois)
- Dwight Loomis (R-Connecticut)
- Charles B. Calvert (UU-Maryland)
- Edward H. Smith (R-New York)
- Jacob P. Chamberlain (R-New York)
- John P.C. Shanks (R-Indiana)
- Joseph Bailey (D-Pennsylvania)
- Samuel T. Worcester (R-Ohio)
- Cyrus Aldrich (R-Minnesota)

==== Claims ====
- Reuben E. Fenton (R-New York)
- Eliakim Persons Walton (R-Vermont)
- William S. Holman (D-Indiana)
- John Hutchins (R-Ohio)
- James T. Hale (R-Pennsylvania)
- John W. Noell (D-Missouri)
- R. Holland Duell (R-New York)
- Edwin H. Webster (UU-Maryland)
- John W. Wallace (R-Pennsylvania)

==== Commerce ====
- Elihu B. Washburne (R-Illinois) (chairman)
- Thomas D. Eliot (R-Massachusetts)
- Elijah Ward (D-New York)
- John T. Nixon (R-New Jersey)
- Elijah Babbitt (R-Pennsylvania)
- John A. Gurley (R-Ohio)
- James S. Rollins (CU-Missouri)
- Cornelius L. L. Leary (UU-Maryland)
- William P. Sheffield (R-Rhode Island)

==== Confiscation of Rebel Property (Select) ====
Listed in Library of Congress summary, but not in Congressional Globe of July 22, 1861

==== District of Columbia ====
- James M. Ashley (R-Ohio)
- Charles B. Calvert (UU-Maryland)
- Richard Franchot (R-Ohio)
- Edward H. Rollins (R-New Hampshire)
- William Morris Davis (R-Pennsylvania)
- Charles H. Upton (UU-Virginia)

==== Elections ====
- Henry L. Dawes (R-Massachusetts) (chairman)
- James H. Campbell (R-Pennsylvania)
- Daniel W. Voorhees (D-Indiana)
- James B. McKean (R-New York)
- Dwight Loomis (R-Connecticut)
- Portus Baxter (R-Vermont)
- George H. Browne (D-Rhode Island)
- John W. Menzies (D-Vermont)

==== Emancipation ====
Listed in Library of Congress summary, but not in Congressional Globe of July 22, 1861

==== Expenditures in the State Department ====
- James B. McKean (R-New York) (chairman)
- James C. Robinson (D-Illinois)
- John T. Nixon (R-New Jersey)
- William Vandever (R-Iowa)
- Charles H. Upton (UU-Virginia)

==== Expenditures in the Treasury Department ====
- Moses F. Odell (D-New York) (chairman)
- James H. Campbell (R-Pennsylvania)
- John A. Bingham (R-Ohio)
- Alexander H. Rice (R-Massachusetts)
- William G. Steele (D-New Jersey)

==== Expenditures in the War Department ====
- William A. Wheeler (R-New York)
- Samuel R. Curtis (R-Iowa)
- Chauncey Vibbard (D-New York)
- William Mitchell (R-Indiana)
- James S. Rollins (UU-Maryland)

==== Expenditures in the Post Office Department ====
- John W. Killinger (R-Pennsylvania) (chairman)
- Charles A. Wickliffe (UU-Kentucky)
- Carey A. Trimble (R-Ohio)
- Francis W. Kellogg (R-Michigan)
- Edward H. Smith (D-New York)

==== Expenditures in the Interior Department ====
- William Allen (D-Ohio) (chairman)
- Martin F. Conway (R-Kansas)
- Socrates N. Sherman (R-New York)
- Samuel Shellabarger (R-Ohio)
- Thomas B. Cooper (D-Pennsylvania)

==== Finance ====
Listed in Library of Congress summary, but not in Congressional Globe of July 22, 1861

==== Foreign Affairs ====
Also known as Foreign Relations

- John J. Crittenden (UU-Kentucky)
- Daniel W. Gooch (R-Massachusetts)
- Samuel S. Cox (D-Ohio)
- Albert S. White (R-Indiana)
- Robert McKnight (R-Pennsylvania)
- Alfred A. Burnham (R-Pennsylvania)
- Francis Thomas (R-Maryland)
- Theodore M. Pomeroy (R-New York)
- George P. Fisher (R-Delaware)

==== Indian Affairs ====
- Cyrus Aldrich (R-Minnesota) (chairman)
- Thomas M. Edwards (R-New Hampshire)
- Robert Mallory (UU-Kentucky)
- Martin F. Conway (R-Kansas)
- William Mitchell (R-Indiana)
- Moses F. Odell (D-New York)
- William E. Lansing (R-New York)
- John Patton (R-Pennsylvania)
- Andrew J. Thayer (D-Oregon)

==== Invalid Pensions ====
- Alfred Ely (R-New York) (chairman)
- Socrates N. Sherman (R-New York)
- John A. Logan (R-Illinois)
- Richard A. Harrison (U-Ohio)
- William P. Cutler (R-Ohio)
- Kellian V. Whaley (UU-Virginia)
- John N. Goodwin (D-Maine)
- Benjamin Wood (D-New York)
- George T. Cobb (D-New Jersey)

==== Judiciary ====
- Albert G. Porter (R-Indiana)
- John S. Carlile (UU-Virginia)
- Benjamin F. Thomas (U-Massachusetts)
- Henry May (UU-Maryland)
- Alexander S. Diven (R-New York)

==== Lake and River Defences ====
Listed in Library of Congress summary, but not in Congressional Globe of July 22, 1861

==== Manufactures ====
Listed in the Congressional Globe, but not listed in the Library of Congress summary page

- John Hutchins (R-Ohio) (chairman)
- James K. Moorhead (R-Pennsylvania)
- Edward Haight (R-New York)
- John B. Alley (R-Massachusetts)
- Albert G. Porter (R-Indiana)
- Alfred Ely (R-New York)
- Isaac N. Arnold (R-Illinois)
- Sydenham E. Ancona (D-Pennsylvania)
- William G. Brown (D-Virginia)

==== Mileage ====
Listed in the Congressional Globe, but not listed in the Library of Congress summary page

- James C. Robinson (D-Illinois) (chairman)
- John W. Killinger (R-Pennsylvania)
- Augustus Frank (R-New York)
- Henry Grider (R-Kentucky)
- Benjamin Wood (D-New York)

==== Military Affairs ====
Also known as Military

- Francis P. Blair Jr. (R-Missouri) (chairman)
- William A. Richardson (D-Illinois)
- James Buffinton (R-Massachusetts)
- Abram B. Olin (R-New York)
- William Allen (D-Ohio)
- Gilman Marston (R-New Hampshire)
- Hendrick B. Wright (R-Massachusetts)
- James S. Jackson (UU-Kentucky)

==== Military Railroad ====
Listed in Library of Congress summary, but not in Congressional Globe of July 22, 1861

==== Militia ====
Also known as Military Affairs and the Militia

- Robert B. Van Valkenburg (R-New York) (chairman)
- William M. Dunn (R-Indiana)
- Sydenham E. Ancona (D-Indiana)
- Charles Delano (D-Republican)
- Charles J. Biddle (D-Pennsylvania)
- Richard A. Harrison (U-Ohio)
- William G. Brown (D-Virginia)
- William P. Cutler (R-Ohio)
- John N. Goodwin (R-Maine)

==== Naval Affairs ====
- Charles B. Sedgwick (R-New York) (chairman)
- Alexander H. Rice (R-Massachusetts)
- Philip B. Fouke (R-Illinois)
- James K. Moorhead (R-Massachusetts)
- James E. English (R-Connecticut)
- John P. Verree (R-Pennsylvania)
- Frederick A. Pike (R-Maine)
- Frederick A. Conkling (R-New York)
- William H. Wadsworth (R-Kentucky)

==== Niagara Ship Canal (Select) ====
Listed in Library of Congress summary, but not in Congressional Globe of July 22, 1861

- Burt Van Horn, Chairman (R-New York)

==== Pacific Railroad ====
Listed in Library of Congress summary, but not in Congressional Globe of July 22, 1861

==== Patents ====
Also known as Patents and Patent Office

- William M. Dunn (R-New York) (chairman)
- John H. Rice (R-Maine)
- Stephen Baker (R-New York)
- Philip Johnson (R-Pennsylvania)
- Warren P. Noble (D-Ohio)

==== Pensions ====
Listed in Library of Congress summary, but not in Congressional Globe of July 22, 1861

==== Post Offices and Post Roads ====
- Schuler Colfax (R-Indiana) (chairman)
- John B. Alley (R-Massachusetts)
- Charles A. Wickliffe (UU-Kentucky)
- Anson P. Morrill (R-Maine)
- William Windom (R-Minnesota)
- Harrison G. Blake (R-Ohio)
- Chauncey Vibbard (D-New York)
- Rowland E. Trowbridge (R-Michigan)
- Elijah H. Norton (R-Missouri)

==== Printing ====
Also known as Joint Committee on Printing

- Eliakim Persons Walton (R-Vermont)
- Ambrose W. Clark (R-New York)
- Joseph Bailey (D-Pennsylvania)

==== Private Land Claims ====
- John W. Noell (D-Missouri)
- Luther Hanchett (R-Wisconsin)
- Burt Van Horn (R-New York)
- John P. C. Shanks (R-Indiana)
- Charles W. Walton (R-Maine)
- Samuel Shellabarger (R-Ohio)
- Jesse Lazear (D-Pennsylvania)

==== Public Lands ====
- John F. Potter (R-Wisconsin) (chairman)
- John Covode (R-Pennsylvania)
- Clement L. Vallandingham (D-Ohio)
- George W. Julian (R-Indiana)
- Carey A. Trimble (R-Ohio)
- William Vandever (R-Iowa)
- Francis W. Kellogg (R-Alabama)
- John W. Crisfield (R-Maryland)
- George C. Woodruff (D-Connecticut)

==== Public Buildings and Grounds ====
- Charles R. Train (R-Massachusetts) (chairman)
- Owen Lovejoy (R-Illinois)
- Isaac C. Delaplaine (D-New York)
- Robert McKnight (R-Pennsylvania)
- James R. Morris (D-Ohio)

==== Public Expenditures ====
- John Covode (R-Pennsylvania) (chairman)
- Thomas M. Edwards (R-New Hampshire)
- James E. Kerrigan (D-New York)
- Charles R. Train (R-Massachusetts)
- William Windom (R-Minnesota)
- Edwin H. Webster (UU-Maryland)
- George W. Julian (R-Indiana)
- Luther Hanchett (R-Wisconsin)
- Chilton A. White (D-Ohio)

==== Revised and Unfinished Business ====
Listed in the Congressional Globe, but not listed in the Library of Congress summary page

- John A. Logan (D-Illinois)
- Elijah Babbitt (R-Pennsylvania)
- John W. Menzies (UU-Kentucky)
- Samuel C. Fessenden (R-Maine)
- Edward Haight (D-New York)

==== Revolutionary Claims ====
- R. Holland Duell (R-New York) (chairman)
- Sidney Edgerton (R-Ohio)
- Thomas B. Cooper (D-Pennsylvania)
- John H. Rice (R-Maine)
- William Wall (R-New York)
- Nehemiah Perry (D-New Jersey)
- Henry Grider (R-Kentucky)
- Albert G. Riddle (R-Ohio)
- Anson P. Morrill (R-Maine)

==== Revolutionary Pensions ====
- Charles H. Van Wyck (R-New York) (chairman)
- Samuel S. Blair (R-Pennsylvania)
- John S. Carlile (UU-Virginia)
- John F. Potter (R-Wisconsin)
- William M. Davis (R-Pennsylvania)
- John B. Steele (D-New York)
- Bradley F. Granger (R-Michigan)
- John Law (D-Indiana)
- William G. Steele (D-New Jersey)

==== Roads and Canals ====
- Robert Mallory (UU-Kentucky) (chairman)
- John A. Gurley (R-Ohio)
- James T. Hale (R-Pennsylvania)
- Burt Van Horn (R-New York)
- Isaac N. Arnold (R-Illinois)
- Robert H. Nugen (D-Ohio)
- Stephen Baker (R-New York)
- Philip Johnson (D-Pennsylvania)
- Fernando C. Beaman (R-Michigan)

==== State of the Union ====
Listed in Library of Congress summary, but not in Congressional Globe of July 22, 1861

==== Territories ====
- James M. Ashley (R-Ohio) (chairman)
- Charles H. Van Wyck (R-New York)
- James A. Cravens (D-Indiana)
- William Kellogg (R-Illinois)
- Fernando C. Beaman (R-Michigan)
- John W. Reid (D-Missouri)
- A. Scott Sloan (R-Wisconsin)
- Goldsmith F. Bailey (R-Massachusetts)
- Aaron Harding (D-Kentucky)

==== Ways and Means ====
- Thaddeus Stevens (R-Pennsylvania) (chairman)
- Justin S. Morrill (R-Vermont)
- John S. Phelps (D-Missouri)
- Elbridge G. Spaulding (R-New York)
- William Appleton (R-Massachusetts)
- Erastus Corning (D-New York)
- Valentine B. Horton (R-Ohio)
- John A. McClernand (D-Illinois)
- John L. N. Stratton (R-New Jersey)

=== Joint committees ===
==== Enrolled Bills ====
- Rep. Bradley F. Granger (R-Michigan)
- Rep. George T. Cobb (D-New Jersey)

==== The Library ====
- Rep. Edward McPherson (R-Pennsylvania)
- Rep. Augustus Frank (R-New York)
- Rep. John Law (D-Indiana)

== Caucuses ==
- Democratic (House)
- Democratic (Senate)

== Employees ==
=== Legislative branch agency directors ===
- Architect of the Capitol: Thomas U. Walter
- Librarian of Congress: John Gould Stephenson

=== Senate ===
- Chaplain: Phineas D. Gurley (Presbyterian), until July 10, 1861
  - Byron Sunderland (Presbyterian), elected July 10, 1861
- Secretary: Asbury Dickins, until July 10, 1861
  - John W. Forney, elected July 15, 1861
  - William Hickey (Chief Clerk) appointed "Acting Secretary", March 22, 1861
- Sergeant at Arms: Dunning R. McNair, until July 6, 1861
  - George T. Brown, elected July 6, 1861

=== House of Representatives ===
- Chaplain: Thomas H. Stockton (Methodist), elected July 6, 1861
- Clerk: John W. Forney, until July 4, 1861
  - Emerson Etheridge, elected July 4, 1861
- Doorkeeper: Ira Goodnow
- Messenger to the Speaker: Thaddeus Morrice
- Postmaster: William S. King
- Sergeant at Arms: Henry William Hoffman, until July 5, 1861
  - Edward Ball, elected July 5, 1861

== See also ==
- 1860 United States elections (elections leading to this Congress)
  - 1860 United States presidential election
  - 1860–61 United States Senate elections
  - 1860–61 United States House of Representatives elections
- 1862 United States elections (elections during this Congress, leading to the next Congress)
  - 1862–63 United States Senate elections
  - 1862–63 United States House of Representatives elections

== Sources ==
- Martis, Kenneth C. (1982). The Historical Atlas of United States Congressional Districts. New York: Macmillan Publishing Company.
- Neely, Mark E. Jr. (2004). "12. The Civil War". In Julian E. Zelizer (ed.). The American Congress: the building of a democracy. Houghton Mifflin Co. ISBN 0-618-17906-2.
- Hart, Albert Bushnell; Channing, Edward, eds. (November 1893). "Ordinances of Secession and Other Documents". Ordinances of Secession and Other Documents. 1860-1861. American History Leaflets Colonial and Constitutional. Vol. 12. New York: A. Lovell & Company. OCLC 7759360. Alt URL
