= Geale =

Geale is a surname. Notable people with the surname include:

- Bob Geale (born 1962), Canadian retired professional ice hockey centre
- Daniel Geale (born 1981), Australian former professional boxer
- Hamilton Geale (1814–1909), Irish politician, judge, barrister, and author
