= Andrew Kirkpatrick =

Andrew Kirkpatrick may refer to:

- Andrew Kirkpatrick (politician) (1848–1928), leader of the South Australian division of the Australian Labor Party, 1917–1918
- Andrew Kirkpatrick (lawyer) (1756–1831), chief justice of the New Jersey Supreme Court, 1804–1825
- Andrew Kirkpatrick (judge) (1844–1904), U.S. federal judge
- Andy Kirkpatrick (born 1971), British mountaineer and author
