= Judge Kirkpatrick =

Judge Kirkpatrick may refer to:

- Andrew Kirkpatrick (judge) (1844–1904), judge of the United States District Court for the District of New Jersey
- William Huntington Kirkpatrick (1885–1970), judge of the United States District Court for the Eastern District of Pennsylvania
