= George M. Dallas (judge) =

American judge (1839–1917)

Judge of the United States Court of Appeals for the Third Circuit
- In office March 17, 1892 – May 24, 1909
- Appointed by: Benjamin Harrison
- Preceded by: Seat established by 26 Stat. 826
- Succeeded by: William M. Lanning

Judge of the United States Circuit Courts for the Third Circuit
- In office March 17, 1892 – May 24, 1909
- Appointed by: Benjamin Harrison
- Preceded by: Seat established by 26 Stat. 826
- Succeeded by: William M. Lanning

Personal details
- Born: George Mifflin Dallas; February 7, 1839 Pittsburgh, Pennsylvania, U.S.
- Died: January 21, 1917 (aged 77)
- Education: read law

George Mifflin Dallas (February 7, 1839 – January 21, 1917) was a United States circuit judge of the United States Court of Appeals for the Third Circuit and of the United States Circuit Courts for the Third Circuit.

== Education and career ==
Born on February 7, 1839, in Pittsburgh, Pennsylvania, Dallas read law in 1859. He entered private practice in Philadelphia, Pennsylvania starting in 1859. He was a Professor of Law for the University of Pennsylvania.

== Federal judicial service ==
Dallas was nominated by President Benjamin Harrison on December 16, 1891, to the United States Court of Appeals for the Third Circuit and the United States Circuit Courts for the Third Circuit, to a new joint seat authorized by 26 Stat. 826. He was confirmed by the United States Senate on March 17, 1892, and received his commission the same day. His service terminated on May 24, 1909, due to his retirement.

== Death ==
Dallas died on January 21, 1917.

== Sources ==
Legal offices
Preceded by Seat established by 26 Stat. 826	Judge of the United States Circuit Courts for the Third Circuit; 1892–1909	Succeeded by William M. Lanning
Preceded by Seat established by 26 Stat. 826	Judge of the United States Court of Appeals for the Third Circuit; 1892–1909	Succeeded by William M. Lanning
