= William M. Lanning =

American judge and politician (1849–1912)

William Mershon Lanning
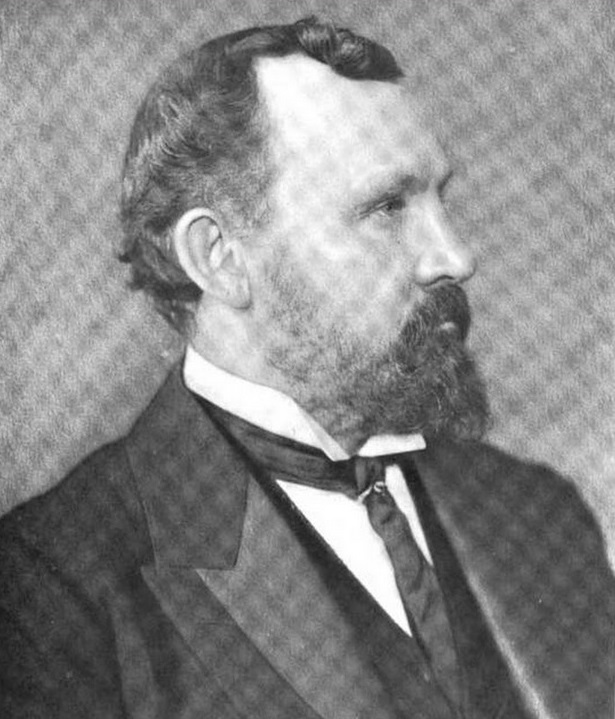

Judge of the United States Court of Appeals for the Third Circuit
- In office May 18, 1909 – February 16, 1912
- Appointed by: William Howard Taft
- Preceded by: George M. Dallas
- Succeeded by: John Bayard McPherson

Judge of the United States Circuit Courts for the Third Circuit
- In office May 18, 1909 – December 31, 1911
- Appointed by: William Howard Taft
- Preceded by: George M. Dallas
- Succeeded by: Seat abolished

Judge of the United States District Court for the District of New Jersey
- In office June 1, 1904 – May 24, 1909
- Appointed by: Theodore Roosevelt
- Preceded by: Andrew Kirkpatrick
- Succeeded by: John Rellstab

Member of the U.S. House of Representatives from New Jersey's 4th district
- In office March 4, 1903 – June 6, 1904
- Preceded by: De Witt C. Flanagan
- Succeeded by: Ira W. Wood

Personal details
- Born: William Mershon Lanning; January 1, 1849 Ewing Township, New Jersey, U.S.
- Died: February 16, 1912 (aged 63) Trenton, New Jersey, U.S.
- Resting place: Presbyterian Cemetery; Ewing Township, New Jersey
- Party: Republican
- Education: read law

William Mershon Lanning (January 1, 1849 – February 16, 1912) was an American lawyer, jurist, and Republican Party politician who represented New Jersey's 4th congressional district in the United States House of Representatives from 1903 to 1904. He later served as a United States district judge of the United States District Court for the District of New Jersey and as a United States Circuit Judge of the United States Court of Appeals for the Third Circuit and the United States Circuit Courts for the Third Circuit.

== Education and career ==
Born in Ewingville, Ewing Township, Mercer County, New Jersey, Lanning graduated from the Lawrenceville School in 1866. He was employed as a teacher in the public schools of Mercer County and in the Trenton Academy from 1866 to 1880. He read law, was admitted to the bar in 1880 and commenced practice in Trenton, New Jersey. Lanning was elected city solicitor for Trenton from 1884 to 1887. He was appointed judge of the city district court in 1887 and served until 1891, when legislated out of office. He served as member of a commission to frame township laws and of the constitutional commission of 1894. He served as President of the Mechanics' National Bank of Trenton in 1899.

== Congressional service ==
In 1902, Lanning was elected as a Republican to the United States House of Representatives of the 58th United States Congress and served from March 4, 1903, to June 6, 1904, when he resigned to accept a federal judicial appointment.

== Federal judicial service ==
Lanning received a recess appointment from President Theodore Roosevelt on June 1, 1904, to a seat on the United States District Court for the District of New Jersey vacated by Judge Andrew Kirkpatrick. He was nominated to the same position by President Roosevelt on December 6, 1904. He was confirmed by the United States Senate on December 13, 1904, and received his commission the same day. His service terminated on May 24, 1909, due to his elevation to the Third Circuit.

Lanning was nominated by President William Howard Taft on May 6, 1909, to a joint seat on the United States Court of Appeals for the Third Circuit and the United States Circuit Courts for the Third Circuit vacated by Judge George M. Dallas. He was confirmed by the Senate on May 18, 1909, and received his commission the same day. On December 31, 1911, the Circuit Courts were abolished and he thereafter served only on the Court of Appeals. His service terminated on February 16, 1912, due to his death in Trenton. He was interred in Presbyterian Cemetery in Ewing Township.

== Honor ==
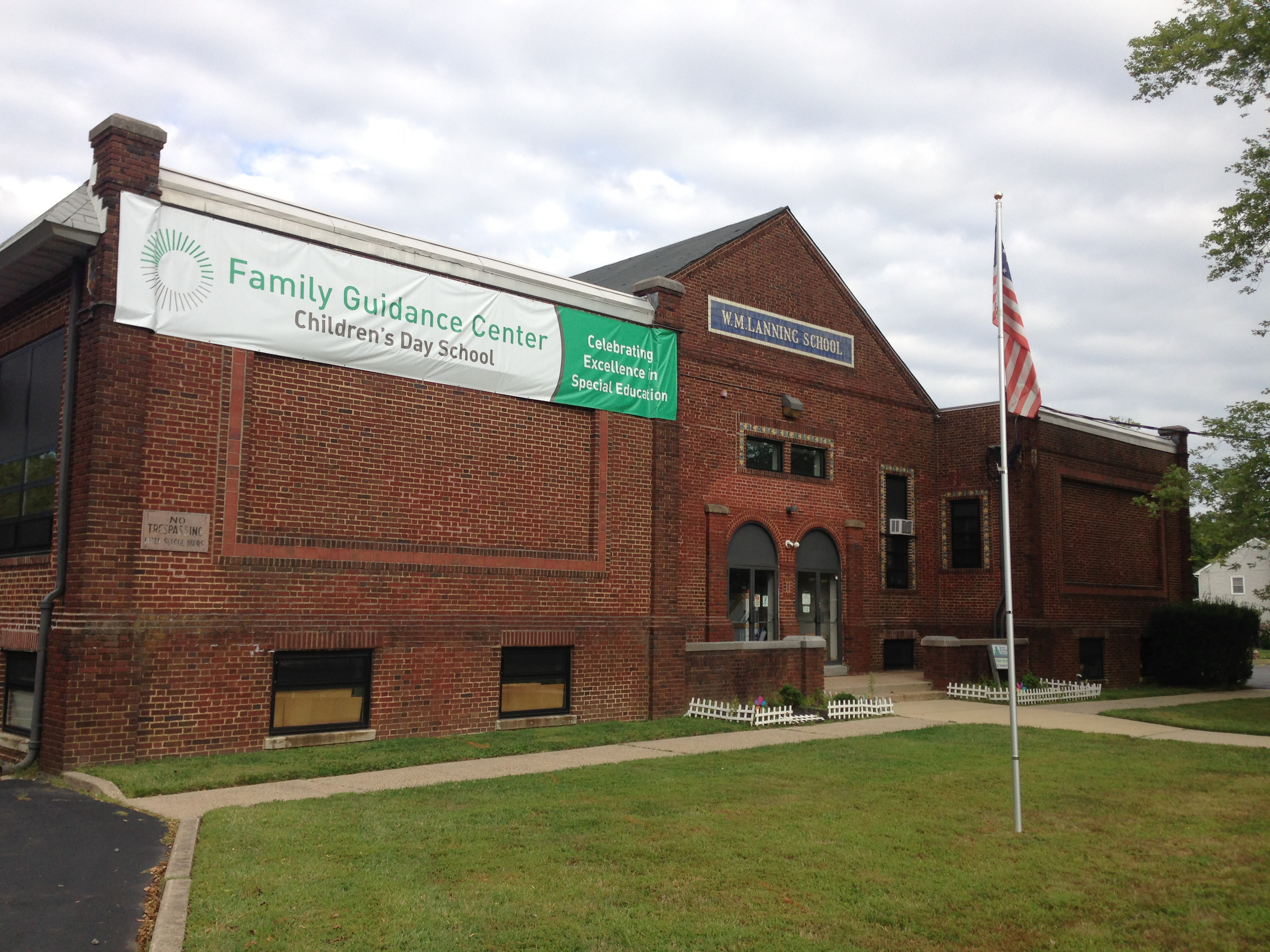
William Lanning's namesake school

An elementary school built on Pennington Road (NJ 31) in Ewing in 1914 was named in Lanning's honor. The school was closed and the building sold to a private institution in the mid-1990s, but as of 2014, is still standing and continues to bear Lanning's name.

U.S. House of Representatives
| Preceded by De Witt C. Flanagan | Member of the U.S. House of Representatives from New Jersey's 4th congressional district 1903–1904 | Succeeded by Ira W. Wood |
Legal offices
| Preceded by Andrew Kirkpatrick | Judge of the United States District Court for the District of New Jersey; 1904–1909 | Succeeded by John Rellstab |
| Preceded by George M. Dallas | Judge of the United States Circuit Courts for the Third Circuit; 1909–1911 | Succeeded by Seat abolished |
| Preceded by George M. Dallas | Judge of the United States Court of Appeals for the Third Circuit; 1909–1912 | Succeeded by John Bayard McPherson |
