= Edward T. Green =

American judge

Judge of the United States District Court for the District of New Jersey
- In office October 24, 1889 – October 10, 1896
- Appointed by: Benjamin Harrison
- Preceded by: John T. Nixon
- Succeeded by: Andrew Kirkpatrick

Personal details
- Born: Edward T. Green; 1837 Trenton, New Jersey, U.S.
- Died: October 10, 1896 (aged 58–59) Trenton, New Jersey, U.S.
- Education: Princeton University; Harvard Law School (LL.B.) read law

Edward T. Green (1837 – October 10, 1896) was a United States district judge of the United States District Court for the District of New Jersey.

== Education and career ==
Born in 1837, (Note: Birth date and month unknown.) in Trenton, New Jersey, Green graduated from Princeton University in 1854 and read law to enter the bar in 1858. He also received a Bachelor of Laws from Harvard Law School in 1858. He was in private practice in Trenton from 1858 to 1889, interrupted by service as a Sergeant in the United States Army during the American Civil War.

== Federal judicial service ==
Green received a recess appointment from President Benjamin Harrison on October 24, 1889, to a seat on the United States District Court for the District of New Jersey vacated by Judge John T. Nixon. He was nominated to the same position by President Harrison on December 16, 1889. He was confirmed by the United States Senate on January 27, 1890, and received his commission the same day. His service terminated on October 10, 1896, due to his death in Trenton.

== Sources ==
Legal offices
Preceded by John T. Nixon	Judge of the United States District Court for the District of New Jersey; 1889–1896	Succeeded by Andrew Kirkpatrick
