= John T. Nixon =

American judge

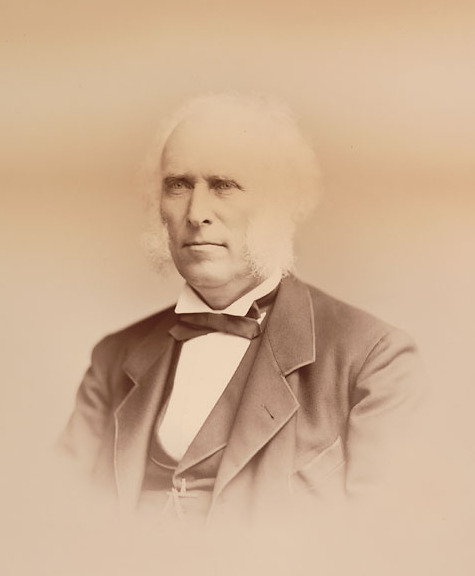

Judge of the United States District Court for the District of New Jersey
- In office April 28, 1870 – September 28, 1889
- Appointed by: Ulysses S. Grant
- Preceded by: Richard Stockton Field
- Succeeded by: Edward T. Green

Member of the U.S. House of Representatives from New Jersey's 1st district
- In office March 4, 1859 – March 3, 1863
- Preceded by: Isaiah D. Clawson
- Succeeded by: John F. Starr

Personal details
- Born: John Thompson Nixon; August 31, 1820 Fairton, New Jersey, US
- Died: September 28, 1889 (aged 69) Stockbridge, Massachusetts, US
- Resting place: Old Broad Street Presbyterian Church and Cemetery; Bridgeton, New Jersey, US
- Party: Republican
- Education: Princeton University (A.M.) read law

John Thompson Nixon (August 31, 1820 – September 28, 1889) was a United States representative from New Jersey and a United States district judge of the United States District Court for the District of New Jersey.

Nixon was nominated by President Ulysses Grant on April 28, 1870, to a seat vacated by Richard S. Field. He was confirmed by the United States Senate on April 29, 1870, and received commission on April 28, 1870. Nixon's service was terminated on September 28, 1889, due to death.

== Education and career ==
Born on August 31, 1820, in Fairton, New Jersey, Nixon attended the public schools, graduated from the College of New Jersey (now Princeton University) in 1841 and received an Artium Magister degree from the same institution in 1843. He read law in 1844 and was admitted to the bar in 1845. He entered private practice in Bridgeton, New Jersey from 1845 to 1859. He was a member of the New Jersey General Assembly from 1848 to 1850, serving as Speaker in 1850.

== Congressional service ==
Nixon was elected as a Republican from New Jersey's 1st congressional district to the United States House of Representatives of the 36th and 37th United States Congresses, serving from March 4, 1859, to March 3, 1863. He was not a candidate for renomination in 1862. Following his departure from Congress, he resumed private practice in Bridgeton from 1863 to 1870.

== Federal judicial service ==
Nixon was nominated by President Ulysses S. Grant on April 28, 1870, to a seat on the United States District Court for the District of New Jersey vacated by Judge Richard Stockton Field. He was confirmed by the United States Senate on April 28, 1870, (Note: FJC Bio is in error regarding his confirmation date, the Senate Executive Journal of the April 28, 1870, indicates he was confirmed on that day.) and received his commission the same day. His service terminated on September 28, 1889, due to his death at his summer home in Stockbridge, Massachusetts. He was interred in Old Broad Street Presbyterian Church and Cemetery in Bridgeton.

== Sources ==
- United States Congress. "John Thompson Nixon (id: N000115)". Biographical Directory of the United States Congress.
- John Thompson Nixon at The Political Graveyard

Political offices
Preceded by Edward W. Whelpley	Speaker of the New Jersey General Assembly; 1850–1850	Succeeded by John H. Phillips
U.S. House of Representatives
Preceded by Isaiah D. Clawson	Member of the U.S. House of Representatives from New Jersey's 1st congressional district 1859–1863	Succeeded by John F. Starr
Legal offices
Preceded by Richard Stockton Field	Judge of the United States District Court for the District of New Jersey; 1870–1889	Succeeded by Edward T. Green
