= Isaiah D. Clawson =

American politician (1822–1879)

Isaiah Dunn Clawson
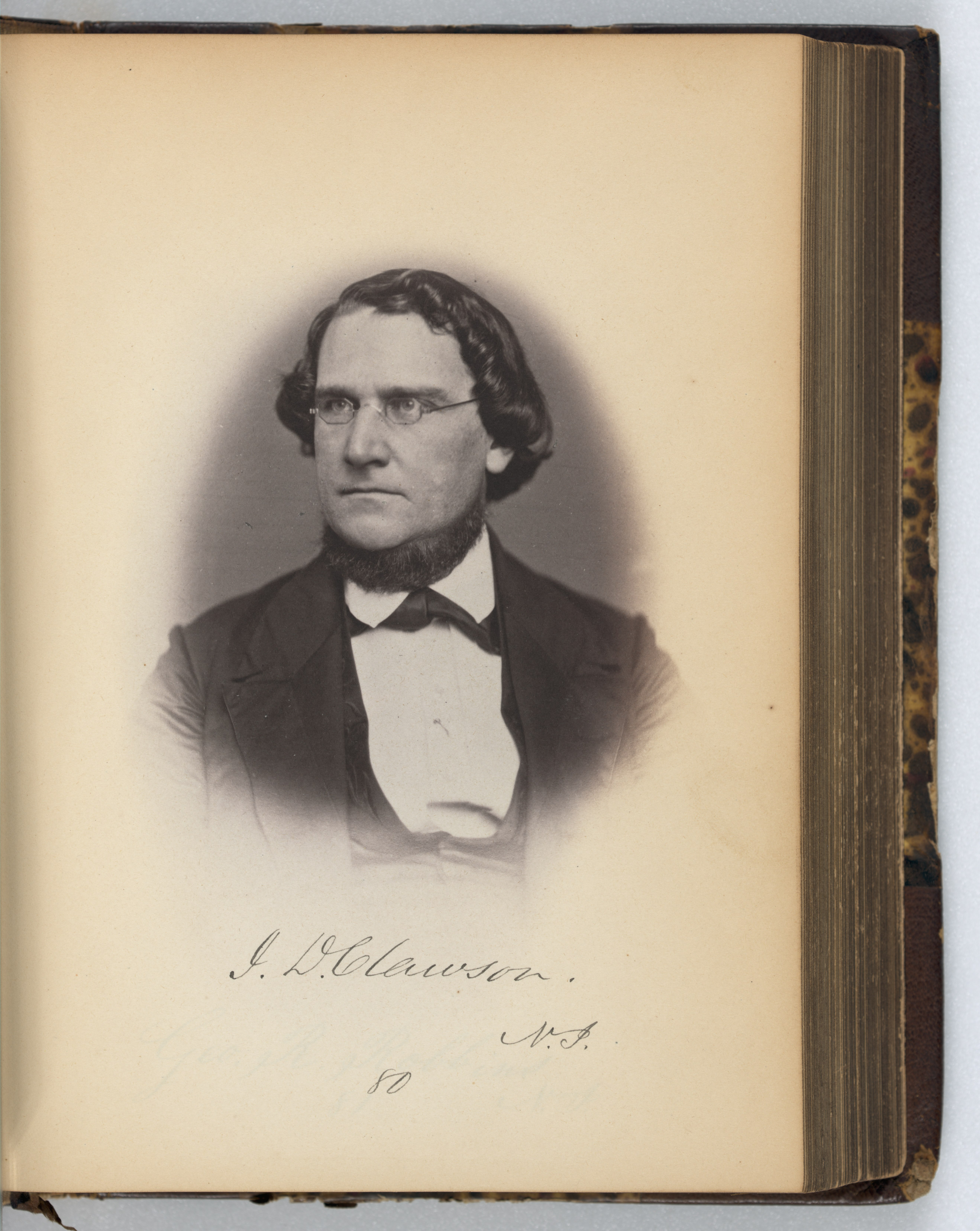
- From 1859's McClees' Gallery of Photographic Portraits of the Senators, Representatives & Delegates of the Thirty-Fifth Congress

Member of the U.S. House of Representatives from New Jersey's 1st district
- In office March 4, 1855 – March 3, 1859
- Preceded by: Nathan T. Stratton
- Succeeded by: John T. Nixon

Personal details
- Born: March 30, 1822 Woodstown, New Jersey, U.S.
- Died: October 9, 1879 (aged 57) Woodstown, New Jersey, U.S.
- Party: Whig (1st term); Republican (2nd term)
- Profession: Physician, Politician

Isaiah Dunn Clawson (March 30, 1822 – October 9, 1879) was an American Whig and Republican Party politician who represented New Jersey's 1st congressional district in the United States House of Representatives from 1855 to 1859.

Born in Woodstown, New Jersey, on March 30, 1822, Clawson attended Delaware College, (Newark, Delaware) and Lafayette College Easton, Pennsylvania, and graduated from Princeton College in 1840 and from the University of Pennsylvania School of Medicine in 1843. He commenced the practice of medicine in Woodstown. He served as a member of the New Jersey General Assembly in 1854.

He was elected as a Whig candidate to the Thirty-fourth Congress and reelected as a Republican to the Thirty-fifth Congress, serving in office from March 4, 1855, to March 3, 1859, but was not a candidate for renomination in 1858.

After leaving Congress, he resumed the practice of medicine in Woodstown, where he died on October 9, 1879. Interment in the Baptist Cemetery.

U.S. House of Representatives
Preceded by Nathan T. Stratton	Member of the U.S. House of Representatives from New Jersey's 1st congressional district March 4, 1855–March 3, 1859	Succeeded by John T. Nixon
