= Nathan T. Stratton =

American politician (1813–1887)

Nathan Taylor Stratton

Member of the U.S. House of Representatives from New Jersey's 1st district
- In office March 4, 1851 – March 3, 1855
- Preceded by: Andrew K. Hay
- Succeeded by: Isaiah D. Clawson

Member of the New Jersey General Assembly
- In office 1843–1844

Personal details
- Born: March 17, 1813 Pilesgrove Township, New Jersey
- Died: March 9, 1887 (aged 73) Mullica Hill, New Jersey
- Party: Democratic
- Profession: Shopkeeper, Politician

Nathan Taylor Stratton (March 17, 1813 – March 9, 1887) was an American Democratic Party politician who represented New Jersey's 1st congressional district in the United States House of Representatives for two terms from 1851 to 1855.

== Early life and education ==
Stratton was born in Pilesgrove Township, New Jersey, on March 17, 1813, where he attended the common schools.

== Career ==
He moved to Mullica Hill, New Jersey (within Harrison Township) in 1829 and clerked in a store, becoming a partner of his employer in 1835. He conducted his own business from 1840 to 1886. He was a member of the New Jersey General Assembly from 1843 to 1844, and was a Justice of the Peace from 1844 to 1847. He also engaged in the real estate business and in agricultural pursuits, and held several local offices.

=== Congress ===
Stratton was elected as a Democrat to the Thirty-second and Thirty-third Congresses, serving in office from March 4, 1851, to March 3, 1855, but was not a candidate for renomination in 1854.

== After Congress ==
He again engaged in mercantile pursuits. He was elected as a member of the Harrison Township committee in 1865. He served as State tax commissioner and as a trustee of the State reform school for boys at Jamesburg, New Jersey, from 1865 to 1887. He was a delegate to the Union National Convention of Conservatives at Philadelphia in 1866. He was an unsuccessful candidate for election in 1880 to the Forty-seventh Congress.

== Death ==
He died in Mullica Hill on March 9, 1887, and was interred in the Baptist Cemetery.

U.S. House of Representatives
| Preceded by Andrew K. Hay | Member of the U.S. House of Representatives from New Jersey's 1st congressional district March 4, 1851–March 3, 1855 | Succeeded by Isaiah D. Clawson |
