= Hamilton Geale =

Irish politician, judge, and author

Hamilton Geale (1814–1909) was an Irish politician, judge, barrister, and author. As a member of the landed gentry who owned some 3,000 acres (1,200 ha) in Ireland, Geale served on the Irish Council and the Imperial Parliament. He was also a deputy judge with the Bristol County and Marylebone County courts in England and a justice of the peace for County Limerick in Ireland.

== Early life ==
Hamilton Geale was born in 1814. He was the son of Catherine (née Crofton) and Piers Geale, a lawyer. His mother was the daughter of the lawyer Marcus Lowther Crofton of Killonahan in County Limerick. His sister was Elizabeth Geale Fortescue; she was the wife of Sir Marcus Somerville, 4th Baronet and Hugh Fortescue, 2nd Earl Fortescue.

Geale graduated from Trinity College at the University of Dublin. He was an amateur artist and displayed his paintings in Dublin. He also published his poetry. In 1827, he served as a midshipman in the Battle of Navarino.

== Career ==
He passed the bar exam in Ireland in April 1839 and became a practicing barrister. In 1841, he was a member of the Reformers of Ireland. He passed the English Bar Exam on November 17, 1841.

He served on the Irish Council in November 1847; it included members of the House of Commons of the United Kingdom, peers of Ireland, and the landed gentry. He was also a member of the Irish Council's manufacturing council. In September 1848, he wrote a letting affirming his intention to sit in the Parliament of Ireland as a member of the gentry. He was a member of the Imperial Parliament which met in Dublin in 1848. He also participated in the first meeting of the Society for Promoting Annual Sessions of the Imperial Parliament in Dublin on December 19, 1848.

In 1852, he ran as a Whig candidate for Kinsale. Part of his platform was a moderate fixed duty on imported corn. He said, "I am in favour of a just and equitable protection to native agriculture, and, without seeking to set aside the recent free-trade policy, I think the agriculturists of Great Britain and Ireland have a right to either a moderate fixed duty or a least to that adjustment of taxation which M'Culloch and other free-trade authorities admit they are entitled to."

Geale served on the Dublin Metropolitan Committee that oversaw the arrangements of the Cork Regatta that was held at the National Exhibition in Cork in 1852. In 1855, he was a supporter of the Administrative Reform Association which sought to remove unfit men from civil, military, and diplomatic service and to promote workers for merit.

In July 1855, the Lord Chancellor appointed Geale to the position of justice of the peace for County Limerick. In 1857 and 1859, he again ran as a candidate for his Kinsale. By 1860, he was a deputy judge in Bristol County in England and a judge of the Insolvent Debtors' Court in Bristol. In 1862, he was also a deputy judge in Marylebone County court.

In 1866, Geale was part of the Irish Railway delegation. He was also a director of the Limerick and North Kerry Railroad and of the Waterford and Passage Railroad.

== Literary legacy ==
Geale is created with Ernesto di Ripalta, a three-volume novel of historical fiction about Italian revolution against Austrian rule, that was published anonymously in 1849. His nonfiction and poetry publications include:

- Miscellaneous Poems by a Midshipman. Dublin: M. Keene and Sons, 1832.
- Juvenilia, a Collection of Miscellaneous Poems. Dublin: M. Keene and Sons, 1833.
- Ireland and Irish Questions. 2nd edition. London: J. Hatchard and Son, 1845.
- Notes of a Two Year's Residence in Italy. Dublin: James McGlashan, 1848.

United States Senator from New Jersey James Walter Wall was charged with plagiarizing Geale's book on Italy in his 1856 book Foreign Etchings.

== Personal life ==
In 1840, Geale married widow Elizabeth Heard (née Lee) of Killonahan in County Limerick. She was the daughter of Henry Lee, a lawyer who was a member of the Irish landed gentry, and the widow of the lawyer Henry George Heard. They lived at Fitzwilliam Square in Dublin but spent the winter of 1841 and other times in London. They had a daughter in 1842.

Later, the Geale family lived in Darraghmore (Irish: An Dairtheach Mhór). In 1878, their address was Durragh [Darragh] Lodge, Kilfinnane, County Limerick. Geale also owned 2,521 acres (1,020 ha) in County Cork and 484 acres (196 ha) in County Limerick.

Geale gave to several charitable causes, including the General Central Relief Fund for All of Ireland and the Benevolent Society of St. Patrick. He donated to the fund for a national monument honoring Daniel O'Connell in 1847 and for a memorial to the poet Thomas Moore in 1852. He was a member of the Poor Law Guardians of Dublin, serving on the Poor-Law Amendment Committee in 1849 which drafted guidelines for all such boards of guardians in Ireland. He was also a steward of the Royal Free Hospital in London.

Geale was a member of the Social Science Association in London and the Windham Club. He died in his residence in Limerick at the age of 95 in 1909.
