= Richard Stockton Field =

American judge

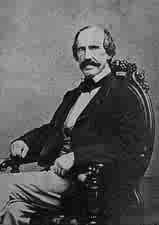

Judge of the United States District Court for the District of New Jersey
- In office January 14, 1863 – April 25, 1870
- Appointed by: Abraham Lincoln
- Preceded by: Philemon Dickerson
- Succeeded by: John T. Nixon

United States Senator from New Jersey
- In office November 21, 1862 – January 14, 1863
- Appointed by: Charles Smith Olden
- Preceded by: John Renshaw Thomson
- Succeeded by: James Walter Wall

Personal details
- Born: Richard Stockton Field; December 31, 1803 Burlington County, New Jersey, US
- Died: May 25, 1870 (aged 66) Princeton, New Jersey, US
- Resting place: Princeton Cemetery
- Party: Republican
- Relatives: Richard Stockton (1730–1781); Richard Stockton (1764–1828); Richard Field Conover
- Education: Princeton University

Richard Stockton Field (December 31, 1803 – May 25, 1870) was an Attorney General of New Jersey, a United States senator from New Jersey and a United States district judge of the United States District Court for the District of New Jersey.

== Education and career ==
Born on December 31, 1803, at White Hill Mansion in Burlington County, New Jersey, Field moved with his mother to Princeton, New Jersey in 1810, graduated from the College of New Jersey (now Princeton University) in 1821, and read law in 1825. He was admitted to the bar and entered private practice in Salem, New Jersey from 1825 to 1832. He was a member of the New Jersey General Assembly from 1833 to 1834, and in 1837. He resumed private practice in Princeton, New Jersey from 1834 to 1838. He was Attorney General of New Jersey from 1838 to 1841. He again resumed private practice in Princeton from 1842 to 1847. He was a member of the New Jersey constitutional convention in 1844. He was a Professor for the law department of Princeton University from 1847 to 1855. He then resumed private practice in Princeton from 1855 to 1862.

== Congressional service ==
Field was appointed as a Republican to the United States Senate to fill the vacancy caused by the death of United States Senator John Renshaw Thomson and served from November 21, 1862, to January 14, 1863, when a successor was elected. He was not a candidate for election in 1863.

== Federal judicial service ==
Field was nominated by President Abraham Lincoln on January 14, 1863, to a seat on the United States District Court for the District of New Jersey vacated by Judge Philemon Dickerson. He was confirmed by the United States Senate on January 14, 1863, and received his commission the same day. His service terminated on April 25, 1870, due to his resignation.

== Death ==
Field died on May 25, 1870, in Princeton. He was interred in Princeton Cemetery.

== Family ==
Field was the great-grandson of Richard Stockton, a New Jersey delegate to the Continental Congress, and grandson of Richard Stockton, a United States senator from New Jersey. In 1831, Field married Mary Ritchie. They were the parents of Helen Field Conover, the wife of Francis Stevens Conover and mother of Richard Field Conover; Colonel Edward Field, a veteran of the American Civil War and career Army officer; and Annis Thomson, the wife of Professor Charles McMillen.

== Civic endeavors ==
Field was a founder of the New Jersey Historical Society, and served as its president. He was a founder of the State Normal School, now known as The College of New Jersey, and served as president of its board of trustees. In addition, Field was a founder of the Farnham School in Beverly, New Jersey, which served as a preparatory school for prospective students of the State Normal School.

== Honors ==
In 1859, Princeton University conferred on Field the honorary degree of LL.D.

== Sources ==
- United States Congress. "Richard Stockton Field (id: F000106)". Biographical Directory of the United States Congress.
- Richard Stockton Field at the Biographical Directory of Federal Judges, a publication of the Federal Judicial Center.
- Richard Stockton Field at The Political Graveyard

U.S. Senate
Preceded by John Renshaw Thomson	U.S. senator (Class 1) from New Jersey; 1862–1863; Served alongside: John C. Ten Eyck	Succeeded by James Walter Wall
Legal offices
Preceded by John Moore White	New Jersey Attorney General; 1838–1841	Succeeded by George P. Mollesson
Preceded by Philemon Dickerson	Judge of the United States District Court for the District of New Jersey; 1863–1870	Succeeded by John T. Nixon
