= James Walter Wall =

American politician (1820-1872)

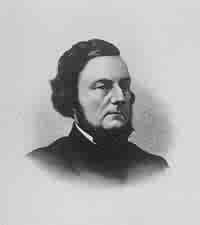

United States Senator from New Jersey
- In office January 14, 1863 – March 3, 1863
- Preceded by: Richard S. Field
- Succeeded by: William Wright

Personal details
- Born: May 26, 1820 Trenton, New Jersey, U.S.
- Died: June 9, 1872 (aged 52) Elizabeth, New Jersey, U.S.
- Party: Democratic

James Walter Wall (May 26, 1820 – June 9, 1872) was an American politician who served as a United States Senator from New Jersey in 1863 and was a leader of the Peace movement during the American Civil War. A member of the Democratic Party, he was the son of U.S. Senator Garret Dorset Wall.

== Biography ==
Born in Trenton, New Jersey, he was tutored privately in Flushing, Queens, and graduated from the College of New Jersey (now Princeton University) in 1838. He studied law and was admitted to the bar in 1841 and commenced practice in Trenton. Served as a commissioner in bankruptcy.

Wall moved in 1847 to Burlington, New Jersey, and was elected Mayor of Burlington, New Jersey in 1850; he was nominated for the Democratic nomination for Congress in 1850, but declined. He was an unsuccessful candidate for election in 1854 to the Thirty-fourth United States Congress. Wall supported John C. Breckinridge in the presidential election of 1860, then was involved in the "editorial direction of the New York Daily News, a peace organ that the government suppressed in August 1861."

The September 12, 1861, edition of The New York Times reported the arrest of Wall on charges of "secession proclivities". There was a rumor in Trenton that other arrests would be made. He was confined in Fort Lafayette for several weeks. Political prisoner Wall was released with George L. Bowne and Pierce Butler (married to Frances ("Fanny") Kemble).

Released after pledging allegiance to the Union, Wall wrote a letter to the editor stating: "There, if the great principles of constitutional liberty are not a delusion and a snare, and our boasted freedom a sham, may yet be found a place of refuge for liberty against despotism -- the oppressed from the oppressor." Wall, a newspaper editor, was alluding to the presence of Simon Cameron at the bar of the Continental Hotel in Philadelphia. Cameron had ordered his arrest. The New York Times published Wall's letter on the first anniversary of the Pratt Street Riot.

Wall was elected by the New Jersey legislature as a Democrat to the United States Senate to fill the vacancy caused by the death of John Renshaw Thomson and served from January 14 to March 3, 1863. He was an unsuccessful candidate for reelection.

Wall was a shameless literary plagiarist: entire pages of description of Italy in his 1856 book Foreign Etchings were stolen without attribution from a 1849 book Notes of a two years' residence in Italy by the Irishman Hamilton Geale.

Wall resumed the practice of law in Burlington; also engaged in literary pursuits. He moved in 1869 to Elizabeth, New Jersey, where he died, aged 52. He was buried in Saint Mary's Episcopal Churchyard in Burlington, New Jersey.

== Selected publications ==
- Wall, James W. Foreign Etchings or Outline Sketches of The Old World's Pleasant Places. Burlington, N.J.: S. Coate Atkinson, 1856.
- Wall, James. The Constitution: Originating in Compromise, It Can Only Be Preserved by Adhering to Its Spirit, and Observing Its Every Obligation. Philadelphia: King & Baird, 1862
- Wall, James. Speeches for the Times by Hon. James W. Wall, of New Jersey. New York: J. Walter & Co., 1864.

U.S. Senate
Preceded by Richard S. Field	U.S. senator (Class 1) from New Jersey; 1863; Served alongside: John C. Ten Eyck	Succeeded by William Wright
