= Andrew Kirkpatrick (judge) =

American judge

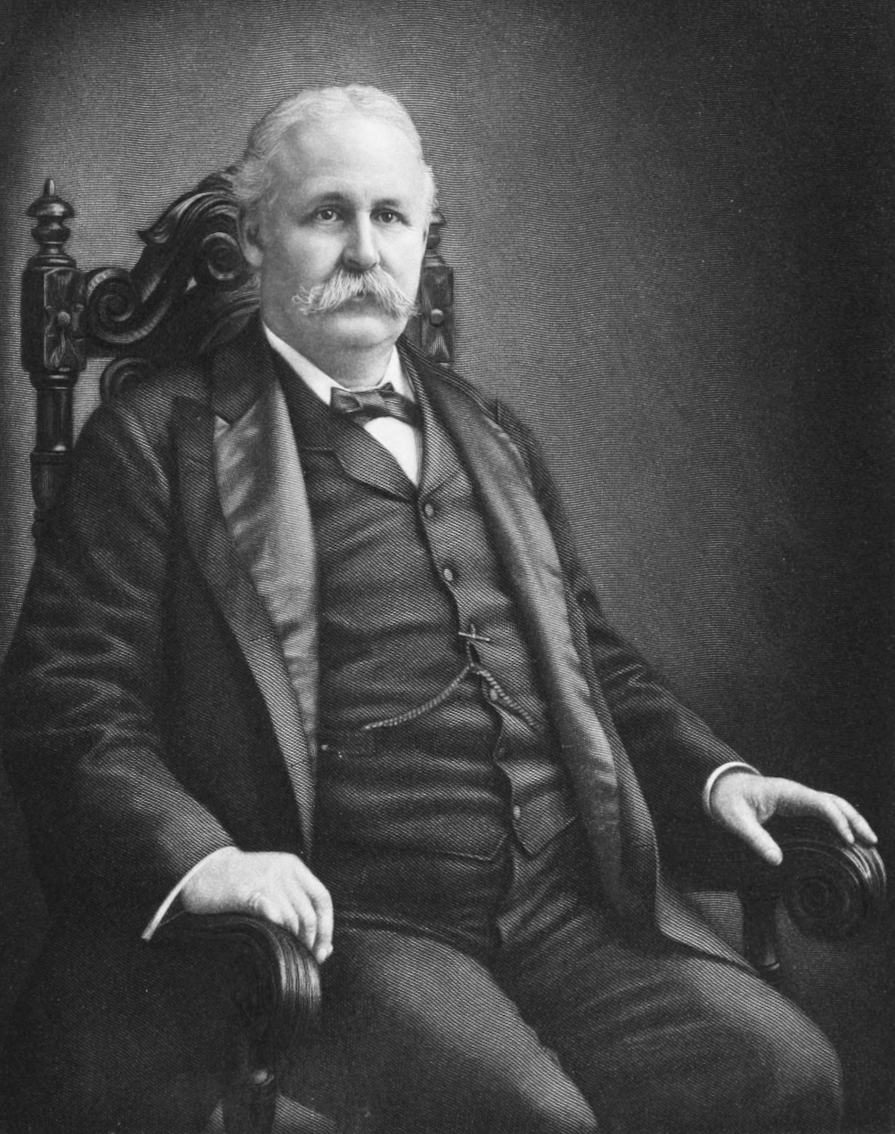

Judge of the United States District Court for the District of New Jersey
- In office November 20, 1896 – May 3, 1904
- Appointed by: Grover Cleveland
- Preceded by: Edward T. Green
- Succeeded by: William M. Lanning

Personal details
- Born: Andrew Kirkpatrick; October 8, 1844 Washington, D.C., U.S.
- Died: May 3, 1904 (aged 59) Newark, New Jersey, U.S.
- Education: Union College (B.A.) read law

Andrew Kirkpatrick (October 8, 1844 – May 3, 1904) was a United States district judge of the United States District Court for the District of New Jersey.

== Education and career ==
Born in Washington, D.C., Kirkpatrick was named after his grandfather, who had been a justice of the New Jersey Supreme Court. The younger Kirkpatrick studied at Rutgers College from 1860 to 1862 before receiving a Bachelor of Arts degree from Union College in 1863. He read law to enter the bar in 1866. He was in private practice in Newark, New Jersey from 1866 to 1885, and was a Judge of the Court of Common Pleas for Essex County, New Jersey from 1885 to 1896.

== Federal judicial service ==
Kirkpatrick received a recess appointment from President Grover Cleveland on November 20, 1896, to a seat on the United States District Court for the District of New Jersey vacated by Judge Edward T. Green. He was nominated to the same position by President Cleveland on December 8, 1896. He was confirmed by the United States Senate on December 15, 1896, and received his commission the same day. His service terminated on May 3, 1904, due to his death in Newark.

Legal offices
Preceded by Edward T. Green	Judge of the United States District Court for the District of New Jersey; 1896–1904	Succeeded by William M. Lanning
